= Polish railway station categories =

Categorisation scheme for railway stations in Poland

Polish railway station categories is the Polish State Railways (PKP) designation of categorising railway stations in Poland. The current classification has been in use since 2015.

== Current classification (2015–present) ==
In 2015, PKP introduced a new classification system of railway stations, based upon the importance of the station in general. Basic criteria are the kind of services served by the station, and number of commercial service points located within them.

All stations are assigned to one of the categories:

- Premium — stations served by international, intercity and interregional routes, which are an important interchange stations for the entire state. Commercial services for passengers are provided.
- Voivodeship — stations served by international, intercity and interregional routes, offering standard commercial services.
- Agglomeration — stations serving domestic routes located up to 50 km (31 mi) away from the city centre, with none or minimal commercial services.
- Regional — stations located in towns, mainly serving local and regional routes, they are an important interchange for counties.
- Local — stations used by commuters arriving to larger cities.
- Tourist — stations with little traffic rate, being mostly used during holiday seasons.

== Former classification (2005–2015) ==
In 2005, the Department of Railway Stations of the PKP divided the most important stations of the nation into four categories. These categories were named from A to D, based on number of passengers, visiting the stations annually.

- Category A (15 stations) - more than 2 million passengers annually,
- Category B (21 stations) - between 1 and 2 million passengers annually,
- Category C (35 stations) - between 300,000 - 1 million passengers annually,
- Category D (2 stations) - fewer than 300,000 passengers annually.

Category A	Category B	Category C	Category D
1. Katowice; 2. Gliwice; 3. Opole Główne; 4. Częstochowa; 5. Kraków Główny; 6. Poznań Główny; 7. Gdańsk Główny; 8. Gdynia Główna; 9. Tczew; 10. Szczecin Główny; 11. Stargard; 12. Bydgoszcz Główna; 13. Warsaw Central; 14. Warszawa Śródmieście PKP; 15. Wrocław Główny	1. Zawiercie; 2. Bielsko-Biała Główna; 3. Tarnów; 4. Rzeszów Główny; 5. Lublin; 6. Kielce; 7. Łódź Kaliska; 8. Łódź Fabryczna; 9. Skierniewice; 10. Olsztyn Główny; 11. Leszno; 12. Toruń Główny; 13. Inowrocław; 14. Białystok; 15. Słupsk; 16. Warszawa Ochota; 17. Warszawa Wileńska; 18. Grodzisk Mazowiecki; 19. Mińsk Mazowiecki; 20. Tłuszcz; 21. Radom	1. Tarnowskie Góry; 2. Myszków; 3. Lubliniec; 4. Żywiec; 5. Czechowice Dziedzice; 6. Tychy; 7. Rybnik; 8. Oświęcim; 9. Trzebinia; 10. Przemyśl Główny; 11. Piotrków Trybunalski; 12. Kutno; 13. Łowicz Główny; 14. Elbląg; 15. Iława Główna; 16. Ostrów Wielkopolski; 17. Zielona Góra; 18. Piła Główna; 19. Gorzów Wielkopolski; 20. Gdańsk Wrzeszcz; 21. Sopot; 22. Malbork; 23. Białogard; 24. Koszalin; 25. Kołobrzeg; 26. Włocławek; 27. Jelenia Góra; 28. Warszawa Zachodnia; 29. Warszawa Wschodnia; 30. Warszawa Gdańska; 31. Otwock; 32. Siedlce; 33. Kędzierzyn Koźle; 34. Oborniki Śląskie; 35. Żmigród	1. Warszawa Stadion; 2. Warszawa Powiśle

== See also ==
- Railway station categories in Great Britain
- German railway station categories
- Netherlands railway station categories
