= Karol Beyer Park =

Urban park in Warsaw, Poland

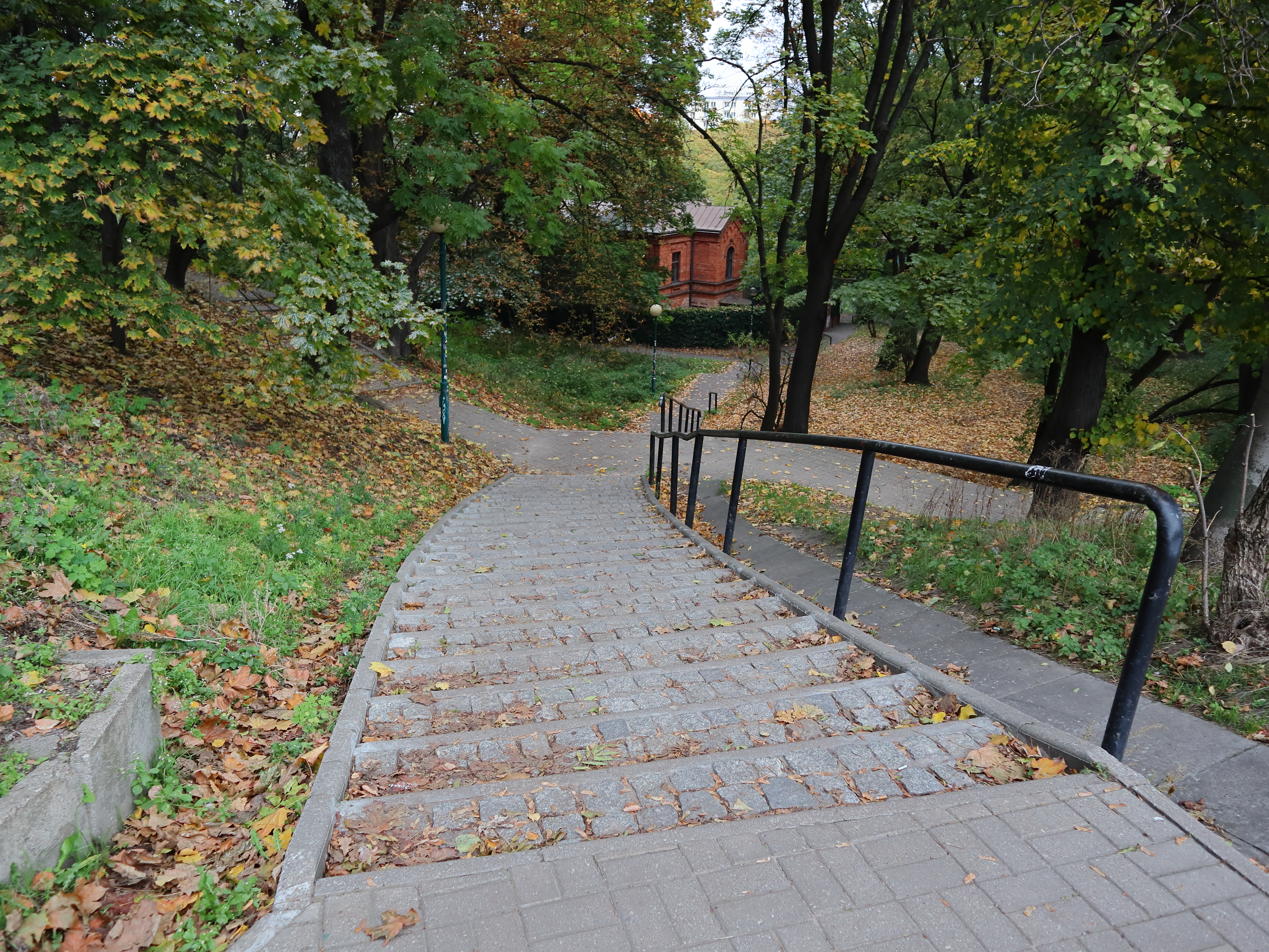
- The Karol Beyer Park in 2022.
- Interactive map of Karol Beyer Park
- Type: Urban park
- Location: Warsaw, Poland
- Coordinates: 52°14′03.9″N 21°01′40″E
- Area: 2.12 hectares (5.2 acres)
- Created: 1970s

The Karol Beyer Park (Note: Polish: Park Karola Beyera, Park im. Karola Beyera) is an urban park in Warsaw, Poland, within the Downtown district. It is located on the Warsaw Escarpment, between Smolna Street, Kruczewskiego Street, Warsaw Cross-City Line, and Warszawa Powiśle railway station. The park was opened in the 1970s.

== History ==
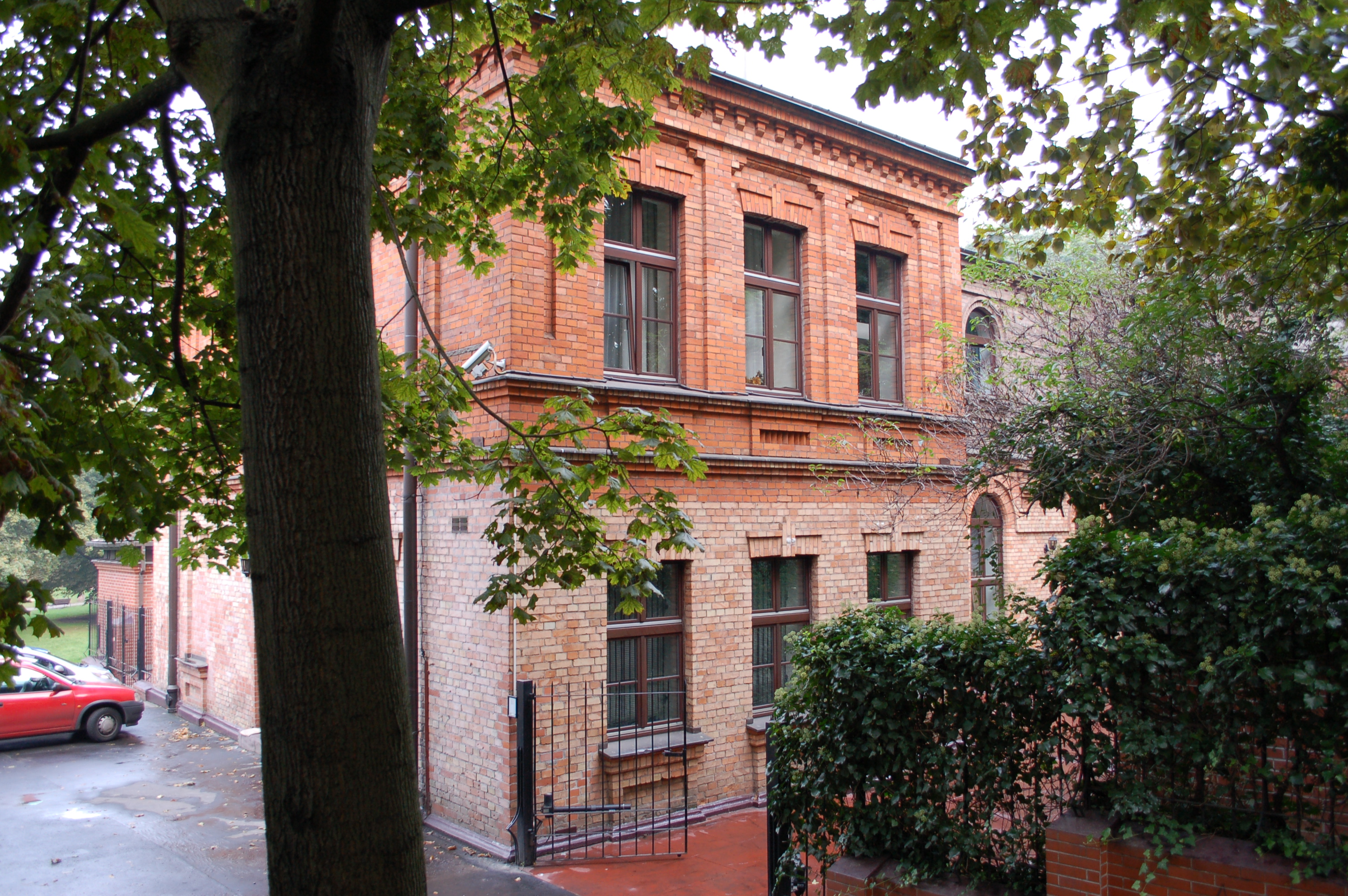
One of the former buildings of the Red Cross hospital located in the park.

Originally, in the area was the site of a small wooden manor house of the Potocki family. Around 1839 it was deconstructed and replaced with a residence of Ignacy Bruszewski. In 1881, it was turned into a lazaretto of Sisters of Saint Elizabeth. In 1883, the organization turned it into the hospital of the Russian Red Cross Society, and since 1919, of the Polish Red Cross. It was further expanded at the end of the 19th century. The hospital complex was particularly deconstructed during the construction of the Warsaw Cross-City Line sometime in the 1920s or 1930s. The main building was deconstructed after the World War II. The area was a frontline during the Warsaw Uprising in 1944.

The park was established in the 1970s, and named after Karol Beyer, a 19th-century photographer and numismatist.

== Characteristics ==
The park is situated between Smolna Street to the north, Kruczewskiego Street to the east, railway tracks of the Warsaw Cross-City Line to the south, and Warszawa Powiśle railway station to the east. To the north it borders the stonewalls of the gardens of the Convent of Daughters of Charity of Saint Vincent de Paul. The park has a total area of 2.12 ha. It is mostly covered by wooded area, largely consisting of buckeyes, black locusts, and lindens. There are also pavilions of the former Red Cross hospital.

Nearby are the garden squares of the Anka Kowalska Square (Polish: Skwer Anki Kowalskiej) and Bohdan Wodiczko Square (Polish: Skwer Bohdana Wodiczki) to the northwest, as well as the Na Książecem Park to the south.
