= Bożydar-Kałęczyn =

Coordinates: 52.2309°N 21.0213°E

The map of the Warsaw agglomeration in the 18th century, with Bożydar-Kałęczyn being marked with number 22.

Bożydar-Kałęczyn, also known as Bożydar, was a suburban town (jurydyka) near the town of Old Warsaw, and a part of Warsaw agglomeration. It was established in 1702, in an area around modern Książęca Street, Smolna Street, and Jerusalem Avenue. It was incorporated into the city of Warsaw in 1794. Currently, its area is divided between districts of Śródmieście (Śródmieście Południowe) and Ochota (Filtry, Old Ochota).

From 1774 to 1776, in the town was located the neighbourhood of Nowa Jerozolima (lit. from Polish: New Jerusalem), inhabited by the Jewish population. It was destroyed in 1776 in accordance to antisemitic laws, with its population being displaced.

== History ==
Bożydar-Kałęczyn was established in 1702 by J. Szwarcenberg-Czerny, in an area around modern Książęca Street, Smolnej Street, and the Jerusalem Avenue. It was partially built in an area of the village of Kałęczyn. Bożydar-Kałęczyn was suburban town in the Warsaw agglomeration, outside the administrative boundaries of Old Warsaw and New Warsaw. It legally functioned as the jurydyka, a suburban town, established with royal decree, independent from Warsaw, including free from paying taxes and following its laws. Its town hall was located at the 8/10 Nowy Świat Street.

In 1774, in Bożydar-Kałęczyn, then owned by August Kazimierz Sułkowski, was established the neighbourhood of Nowa Jerozolima (lit. from Polish: New Jerusalem), inhabited by the Jewish population. It was located between the modern the Artur Zawisza Square and the Kaliska Street. It existed in violation of the Privilegium de non tolerandis Judaeis law, which forbid Jewish people, from living in Old Warsaw, and in 2 mile (3.2 km) radius from it. As such the city hall of Old Warsaw had sued Sułkowski, demanding the neighbourhood to be destroyed. Despite protests of the Jewish population, the neighbourhood had been destroyed on 23 January 1776, with its inhabitants displaced, their trading goods confiscated, and the houses being torn down.

The Jerusalem Avenue in Warsaw, was named in the commemoration of the neighbourhood.

In 1791, in accordance to the Free Royal Cities Act, it was decided to combine Nowogrodzka, together with other suburban towns, as well as towns of Old Warsaw, and New Warsaw, into a singular entity, forming the city of Warsaw. The execution of the act was blocked by the Targowica Confederation, which delayed the unification to 1794.
