= Radisson Blu Sobieski Hotel =

Postmodern hotel in Warsaw, Poland

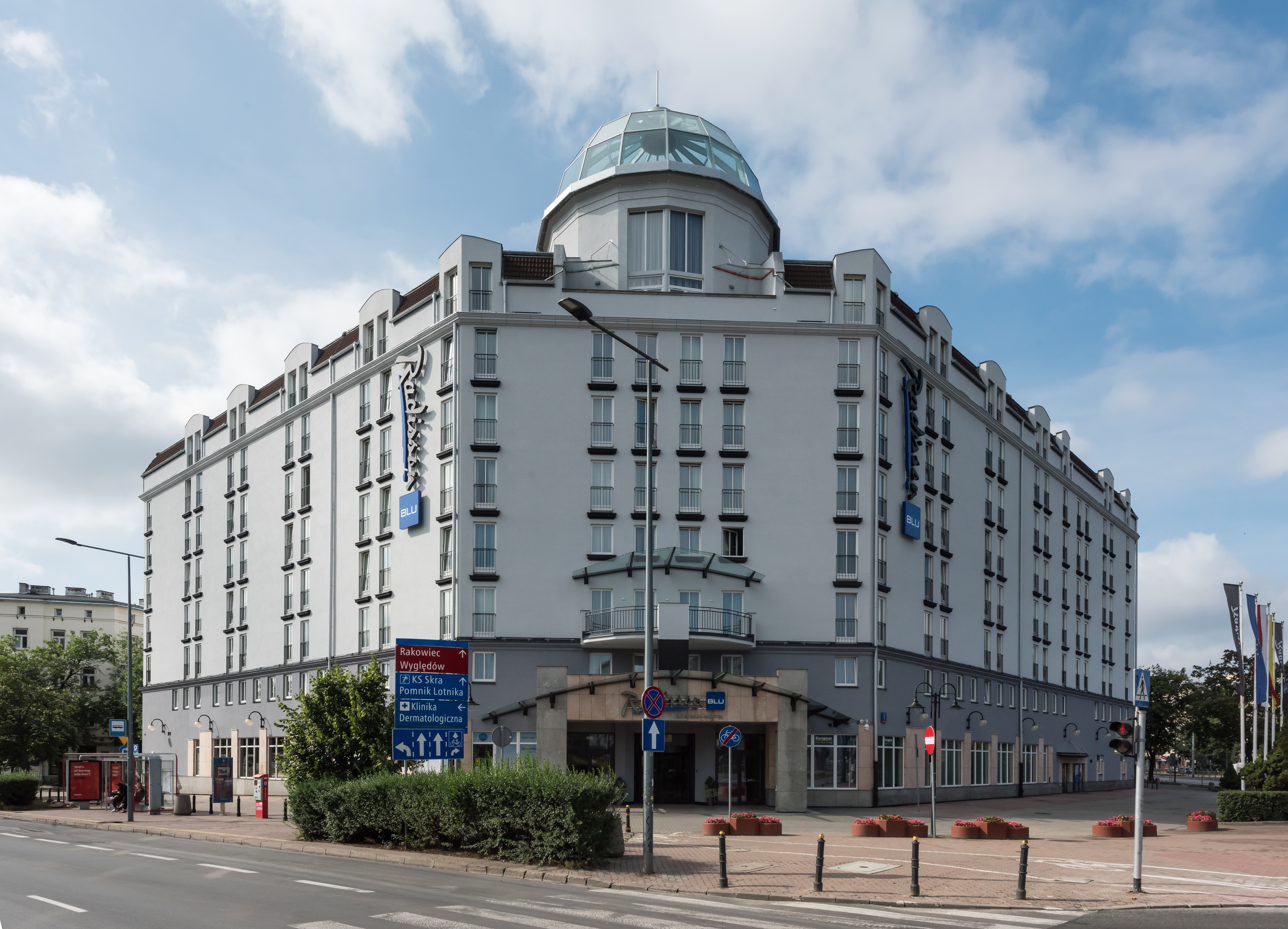
- The building in 2023.
- Interactive map of the Radisson Blu Sobieski Hotel area

General information
- Type: Hotel
- Architectural style: Postmodern
- Location: Ochota, Warsaw, Poland, 1 Artur Zawisza Square
- Coordinates: 52°13′27.87″N 20°59′20.22″E
- Construction started: 1990
- Completed: 1992
- Owner: Wenaasgruppen

Technical details
- Floor count: 7
- Floor area: 28,850 m^{2}

Design and construction
- Architects: Wolfgang Triessing; Maciej Nowicki
- Developer: PKO Bank Polski; Bank Pekao

The Radisson Blu Sobieski Hotel, formerly known as the Hotel Jan III Sobieski, is a postmodern fourstar hotel in Warsaw, Poland, located at 1 Artur Zawisza Square within the Ochota district. It was opened in 1992.

== History ==
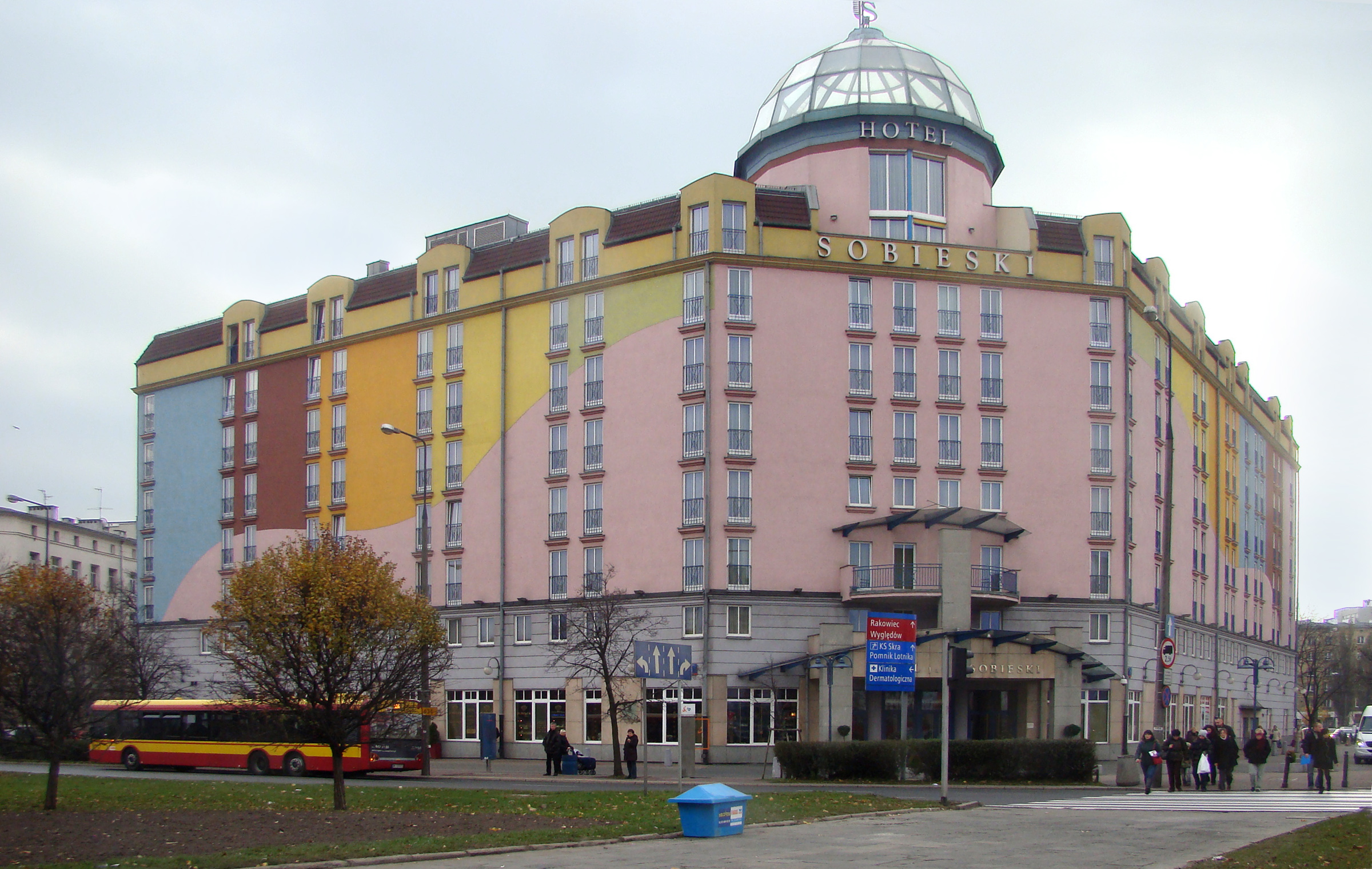
The building in 2010, with its original colourscheme.

The building was designed by Wolfgang Triessing and Maciej Nowicki, thought according to some sources it was Hans Piccotini instead. It was constructed between 1990 and 1992, as a joined venture of PKO Bank Polski and Bank Pekao. Its original painting scheme of blue, yellow, brown, and orange stripes caused controversies and criticism.

In 2006, the building was sold to company Warimpex and begun being operated by the Vienna International Hotels. In 2011, it was again sold to Wenaasgruppen, which chose Rezidor Hotels and Resorts as a new operator. It was also incorporated into the Radisson Blu brand, becoming one of its two hotels in Poland.

In 2023, the building was repainted into a uniform light grey colour scheme. The city conservator-restorer filed an application for the building to be listed on the heritage list, which would allow to preserve the original paintscheme, however, it was rejected.

== Architecture ==
The building has a postmodern design, with a large glass-covered dome at the top, evoking a look of tenement house from the turn to the 20th century. It has seven storeys and a total floor area of 28,850 m^{2}. The hotel has 435 guest rooms.
