= Grupa Warszawa =

Polish restaurant and film company

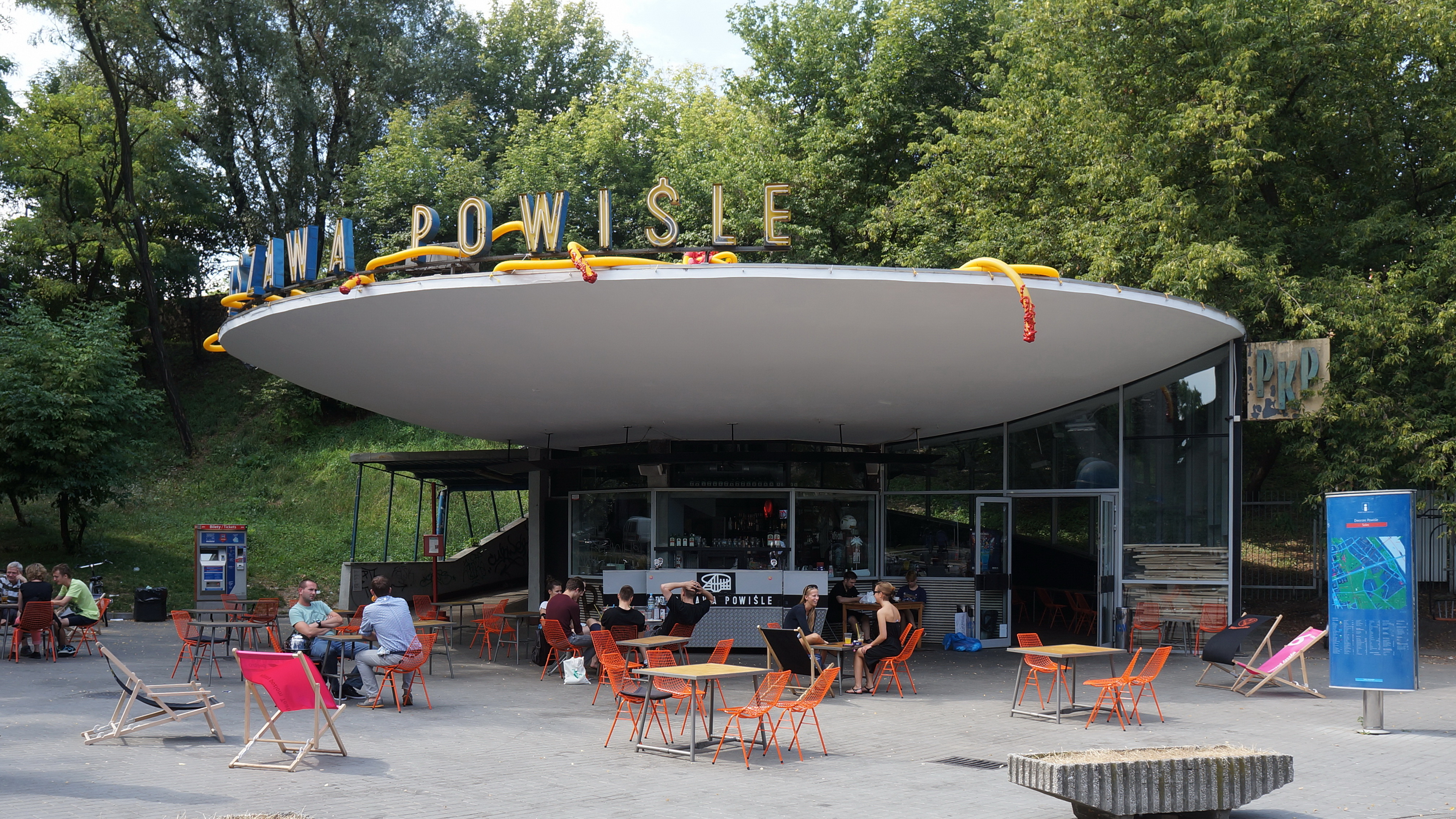
- The company's founding club-café, Warsaw's popular Warszawa Powiśle, operating in the modernist former railway ticket office booth.
- Type: Limited liability company
- Industry: Restaurants; Nightclubs; Bars; Feature films
- Founded: 2008; 18 years ago in Warsaw, Poland
- Founder: Norbert Redkie
- Headquarters: Warsaw, Poland
- Key people: Zbigniew Straszak (CEO); Norbert Redkie; Hubert Karsz (VP)
- Brands: Warszawa Powiśle; Syreni Śpiew; Biała – Zjedz i wypij; Weles
- Services: Gastronomy; Event management; Marketing strategy; Film production
- Subsidiaries: Mental Disorder 4
- Website: grupawarszawa.com

Grupa Warszawa is a Polish entertainment company based in Warsaw, Poland, founded in 2008 by the entrepreneur and film producer Norbert Redkie. The company manages clubs, restaurants, and music venues in its namesake Warsaw, including a café-bar Warszawa Powiśle, restaurant Syreni Śpiew Koneser, as well as a feature-film production house Mental Disorder 4.

== Activities ==
The company specializes in cultural and gastronomic initiatives around Warsaw, by emphasizing the architecture of individual locations, inspired by the local tradition. In 2009, Redkie was joined by Bartłomiej Kraciuk, and in 2011, by Hubert Karsz. In 2018, Kraciuk withdrew from Grupa Warszawa's operations.

=== Warszawa Powiśle ===
In 2008, Grupa Warszawa won a call for bids for the development of a modernist building of the suburban railway station Warszawa Powiśle. At a cost of PLN 750,000 (US$190,000), in the former ticket office rented from the Polish State Railways, and renovated by the design group Centrala, the company opened a café-bar with homemade food and beer. On June 26, 2009, over 2,000 people appeared at the grand opening.

As the organizer of several thousand cultural events, the bar has become one of the most popular venues in Warsaw. It has promoted young culture and art – so far, the interiors have been decorated with wall decal by artists Edward Dwurnik, Jan Dziaczkowski, and Jan Kallwejt. In 2013, Gazeta Wyborcza called the Warszawa Powiśle one of the “10 Pubs That Changed Warsaw.”

Although from the very launch of the bar, its popularity that attracted crowds was the reason for numerous complaints and city guard interventions. In September 2012, the guards filed withdrawing the license to sell alcohol. After artists and celebrities stood up to defend the bar, the application was ultimately rejected by the district mayor.

=== Syreni Śpiew ===
On New Year's Eve 2011, Redkie and Kraciuk, together with the new partner Hubert Karsz, opened a whiskey bar Syreni Śpiew [The Mermaid Song], in another modernist pavilion of the former hotel restaurant-and-cafe. For the needs of the venue with live music, the Grupa Warszawa creators have restored the building, along with original mosaics, maintaining as much original decor as possible. Fashion shows, conventions, photo shoots, and professional conferences were regularly held in the bar.

It was located in its original location until 2016, as the poor condition of the building prevented further operation of the premises. A new, multi-level restaurant headquarters, with a club and bar, was opened in September 2019, at the complex Praga Koneser Center.

=== Other initiatives ===
In 2012, Grupa Warszawa opened a small confectionery Lody na Patyku [The Ice Lolly], that served dessert wines and organized art workshops and animations for children. Between 2015 and 2019, in a socialist-realist building at Warsaw's Żurawia Street, the bistro Zorza [The Dawn] was opened, with interiors in the Art Deco style.

From June 2016, in a modernist Biała Willa [The White Villa] with a garden, in Saska Kępa, the company ran a restaurant Biała – Zjedz i wypij [Eat and Drink], based on contemporary Polish cuisine. Until April 2020, the restaurant was a place of regular art exhibitions and design galleries.

Further venues included the cafe Moderna in the Museum of Modern Art, an intimate cocktail bar Weles, a grill bar Ruszt [The Grate] – and an Asian garden restaurant Fokim (later renamed Granda [The Rumpus]), with live music, karaoke, and gua bao rolls.

In addition to running clubs and restaurants, Grupa Warszawa also runs an art foundation Fundacja Więcej Sztuki, and a convention center Szarotka [The Edelweiss]. It also provides marketing consulting services, and implements commissioned gastronomic projects. Between 2013 and 2015, it ran a seasonal cultural pavilion Stacja Mercedes (with the local branch of Mercedes-Benz).

=== Meals for Seniors ===
From January 2020, Grupa Warszawa ran a program of cheap dinners for students and seniors. In April 2020, with the outbreak of the COVID-19 pandemic, the program evolved to a crowd-funded charity Posiłek dla Seniora (Meals for Seniors), where the Syreni Śpiew cooks prepare and deliver lunches for the elderly.

== Film production ==
As the subsidiary of the Grupa Warszawa, the company runs a production house Mental Disorder 4 (a.k.a. MD4), which produces feature films, with Agnieszka Kurzydło and Redkie as producers. So far, the studio's credits include:

- Baby Blues (2012)
- In the Name of (2013)
- Kebab i Horoskop [Kebab and Horoscope] (2014)
- Czerwony pająk [The Red Spider] (2015)
- The Test (2015)
- Czerwony Kapitan [The Red Captain] (2016, international co-production)
- Fugue (2018)
- Via Carpatia (2018)

== Awards and accolades ==
The Warszawa Powiśle was awarded with the title “Opening of the Year,” by the TVN Warszawa, and the Nocne Marki award for the “Place of the Year 2009,” by Aktivist magazine.

The Syreni Śpiew won the Warsaw Insider magazine award for 2012, as the “Best New Bar”, and was named as the Club of the Year in the plebiscite “Warszawiaki 2015”.

The creators of Grupa Warszawa have been awarded by Design Alive magazine readers, in the Strategist category, for 2016.

The Stacja Mercedes project was awarded in Golden Arrow, and Złote Spinacze [Golden Clips] competitions, and was nominated for the European Excellence Award.

The Weles cocktail bar won the Best Cocktail Bar award in Warsaw Insider magazine competition.
