= Atlas Tower =

Coordinates: 52.2244°N 20.9917°E

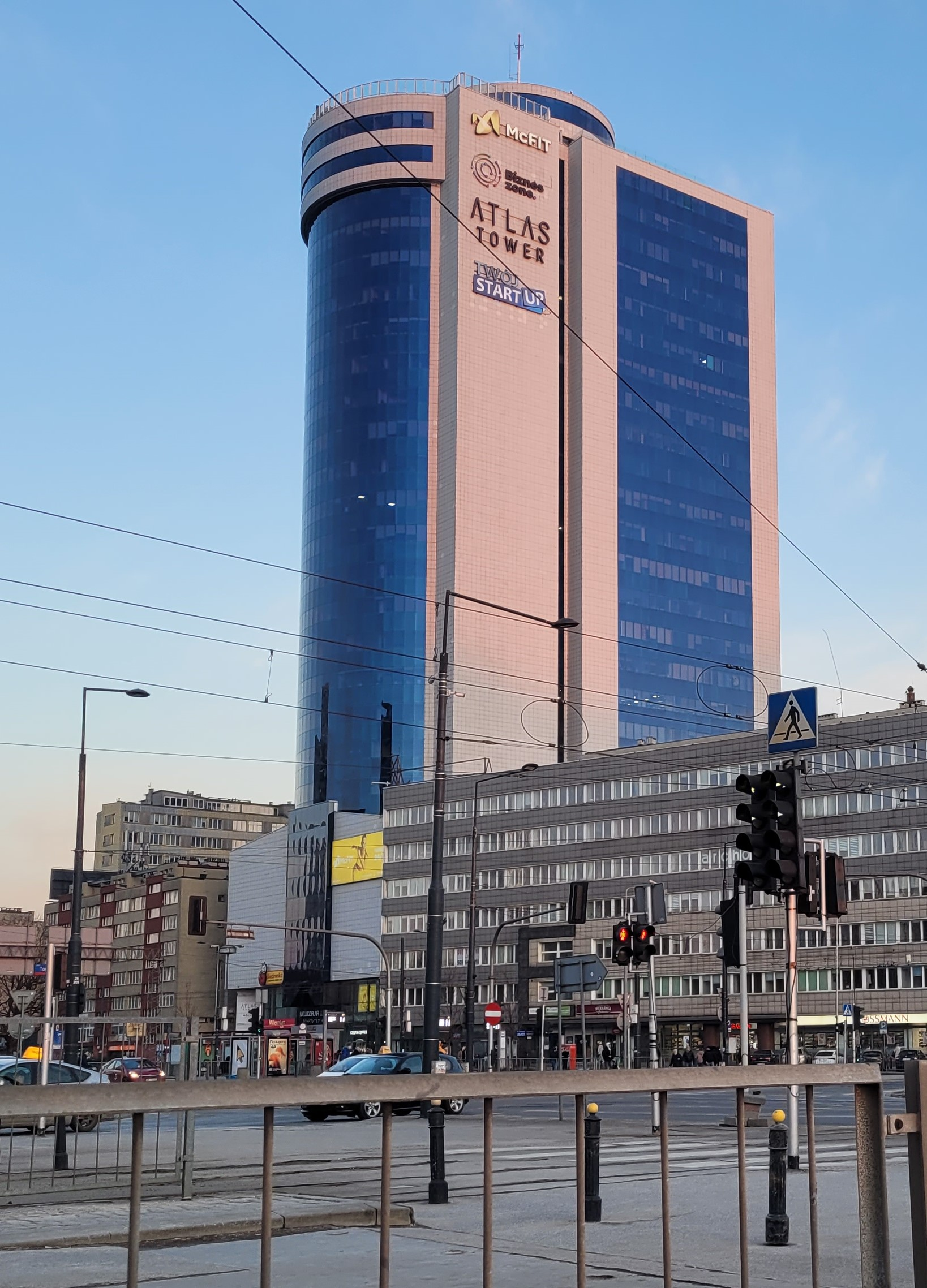
- Interactive map of the Atlas Tower area
- Former names: Reform Plaza (1999–2003); Millennium Plaza (2003–2018)

General information
- Location: Warsaw, Poland, Al. Jerozolimskie 123a, Ochota
- Construction started: 1996
- Completed: 1999

Height
- Height: 116m

Technical details
- Floor count: 28

Design and construction
- Architecture firm: Vahap Toy

Atlas Tower (formerly Millennium Plaza and Reform Plaza) is a skyscraper in Warsaw located at Artur Zawisza Square on the western part of Aleje Jerozolimskie. The building was designed and built by the controversial Turkish architect and businessman Vahap Toy.

The building was completed in 1999, after the expulsion of Vahap Toy from Poland and the termination of his business interests in the country. First called Reform Plaza after the Turkish firm, Reform Company Ltd., that financed the US$45 million project, the building changed owners and was renamed.

The facility is 116 meters high, has 31 floors, of which three are below ground. The two lowest levels house a car park for 436 vehicles and utility facilities, the next four floors are retail, while the fifth is occupied by restaurants. The sixth floor contains conference facilities and can be combined into one large conference room. Language exams organized by the British Council are held in this area. The remainder of the floors are Class A offices which also include the Embassies of Argentina and Mexico to Poland. Two panoramic elevators serve the commercial area, and six serve the office tower.

Until March 2008, the Millennium Plaza served as the headquarters of Bank Millennium, from which it derived its previous name. Other well-known tenants included the Publishing and Advertising Agency On (publisher of the weekly Wprost), Dell, and ABG S.A., a publicly listed IT company, and Salesforce Consulting Firm VRP Consulting Sp. z o.o.

Residents of Warsaw sometimes nickname the building "Toi-Toi", after a brand of portable toilets. Most likely, this term is a combination of the names of the first owner, the peculiar design of the skyscraper, and its similar coloration.

== See also ==
- List of tallest buildings in Poland
