= Artur Zawisza Square =

Square in Warsaw

Coordinates: 52°13′28″N 20°59′20″E

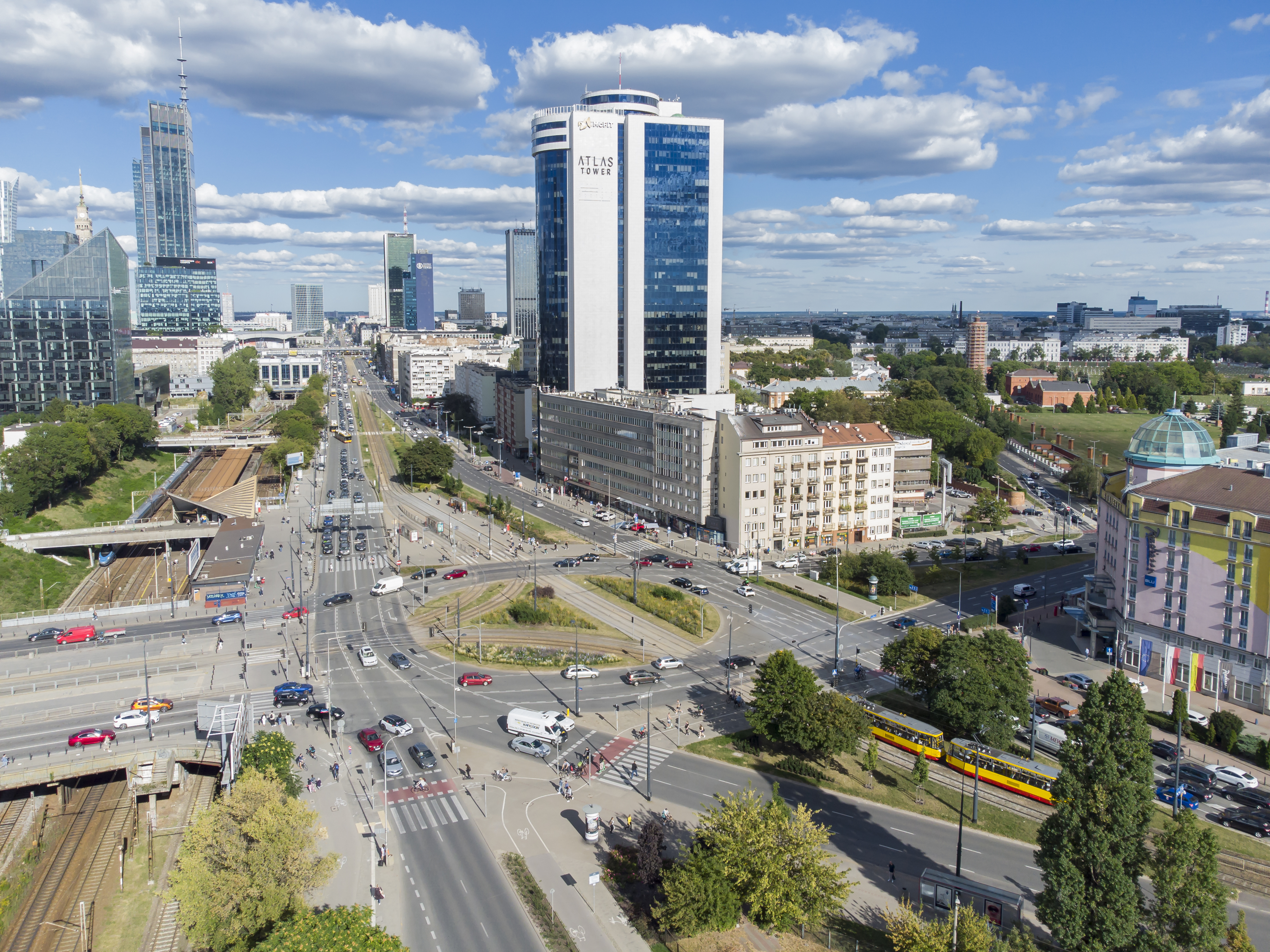
Aerial view from west

Artur Zawisza Square (Polish: plac Artura Zawiszy, commonly abbreviated as "plac Zawiszy") is a public square in Warsaw's borough of Ochota. It is named after Artur Zawisza, a 19th-century Polish revolutionary who was executed on the spot by Russians in 1833.

Currently a major roundabout at the intersection of Jerusalem Avenue, Raszyńska, Grójecka and Towarowa Streets, for centuries its spot was occupied by the so-called Jerusalem Toll-house or Jerusalem Gate (Polish: Rogatki Jerozolimskie). The Jerusalem Toll-house was created in 1770, as a toll-house on the road leading from downtown Warsaw towards the jurydyka of Nowa Jerozolima ("New Jerusalem") and the Kraków Road (modern Grójecka Street). The spot was chosen for a gate in the newly erected Lubomirski's Ramparts. Between 1816 and 1818, two Classicist buildings of the toll-house were built by Jakub Kubicki. In 1823, a square was created surrounding the new toll-houses. The area, in the 19th century still far-removed from the city centre, was a spot of particularly heavy fighting during the battle of Warsaw of 1831.

When the fortifications surrounding Warsaw were dismantled in the 1870s, the area started to be built-up and settled, initially with wooden suburban houses around the square, but even before World War I, the area was being encroached upon by the dense city infrastructure. In 1909, a tramway line was connected to the square.

During World War II in 1942, the 19th century toll-houses were dismantled by the Germans, while the buildings surrounding the square were demolished in the aftermath of the Warsaw Uprising. They were not rebuilt after the war, and the square was surrounded by new office buildings and shopping malls only recently.

Among notable buildings located at Zawisza Square are the Millennium Plaza and Warszawa Ochota railway station.

The square has pollinating bees.
