= Baby Blues (2012 film) =

2012 Polish film

- Film poster
- Directed by: Katarzyna Rosłaniec
- Written by: Katarzyna Rosłaniec
- Produced by: Agnieszka Kurzydlo
- Starring: Magdalena Berus
- Cinematography: Jens Ramborg
- Edited by: Jacek Drosio; Bartek Pietras
- Production company: Mental Disorder 4
- Distributed by: Kino Świat
- Release dates: 10 September 2012 (TIFF); 4 January 2013 (Poland)
- Running time: 100 minutes
- Country: Poland
- Language: Polish

Baby Blues is a 2012 Polish drama film directed by Katarzyna Rosłaniec. The story is raising the problem of teenage mothers, who allegedly think that a baby is just an addition to clothes and hairstyle.

== Plot ==
Natalia is a seventeen-year-old living in Warsaw. She has a child with Jakub, but neither of the parents can take care of the baby.

== Cast ==
- Magdalena Berus as Natalia
- Nikodem Rozbicki as Jakub
- Klaudia Bułka as Martyna
- Magdalena Boczarska as Marzena, Natalia's mother
- Jan Frycz as Jakub's father
- Danuta Stenka as Jakubs' mother
