= Warszawa Powiśle railway station =

Railway station in Warsaw, Poland

Warszawa Powiśle Warsaw Powiśle
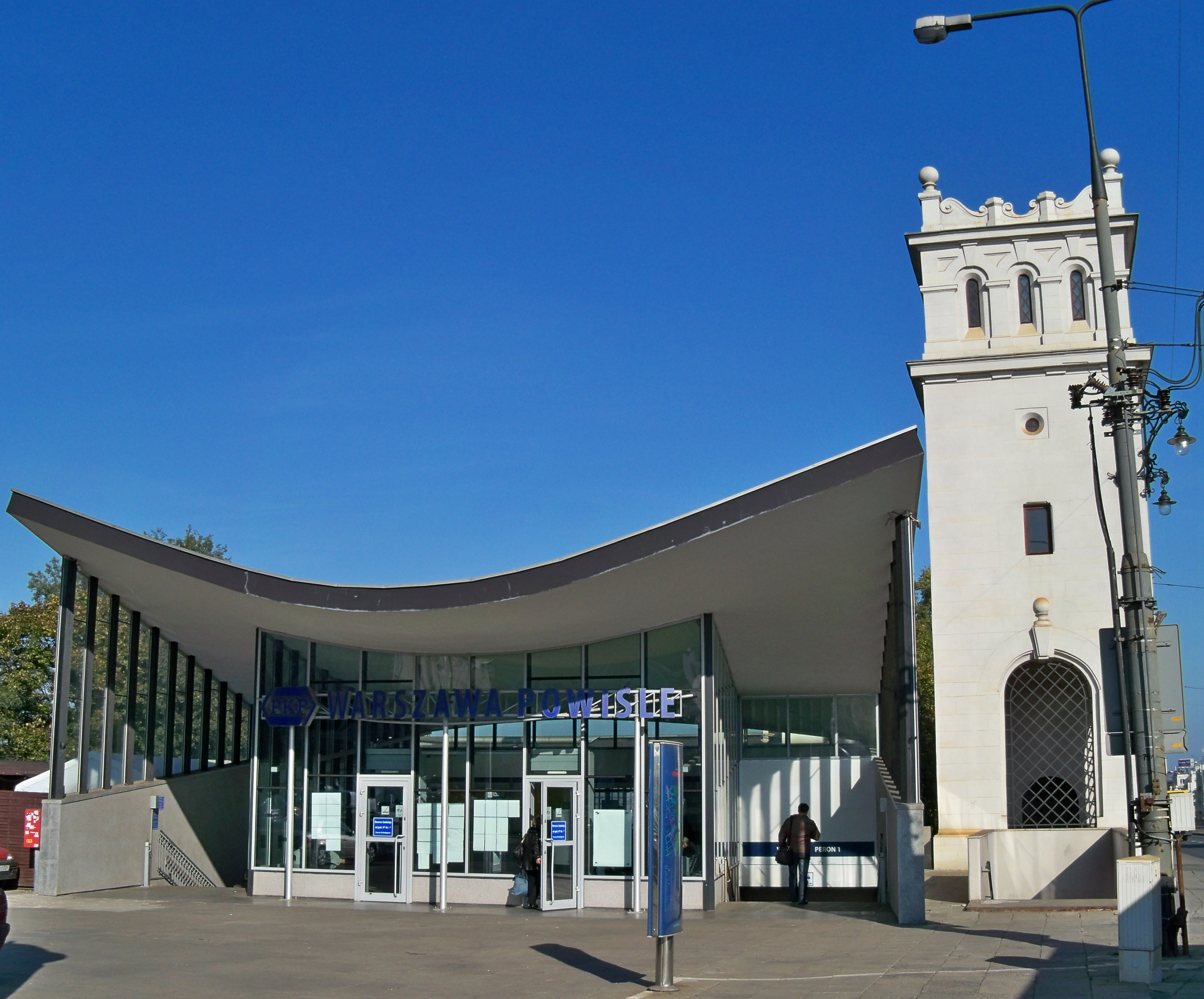
- West entrance to the platforms with the ticket office, located on the level of Aleje Jerozolimskie on the edge of the terrace of the Vistula next to the Poniatowski Bridge's little tower

General information
- Location: Aleja 3 Maja, Warsaw, Masovian; Poland
- Coordinates: 52.233611°N 21.027778°E
- System: Urban Railway Station
- Owner: Polskie Koleje Państwowe S.A.
- Line: 448 Warszawa Zachodnia – Warszawa Rembertów
- Platforms: 2
- Tracks: 2

History
- Opened: 1963

Services
Preceding station	Masovian Railways	Following station
Warszawa Śródmieście towards Skierniewice	R1	Warszawa Stadion towards Warszawa Wschodnia
Warszawa Śródmieście towards Warszawa Zachodnia	R2	Warszawa Stadion towards Łuków
Warszawa Śródmieście towards Kutno	R3	Warszawa Stadion towards Warszawa Wschodnia
Warszawa Śródmieście towards Warszawa Zachodnia	R6	Warszawa Stadion towards Czyżew
Warszawa Śródmieście towards Warszawa Zachodnia	R7	Warszawa Stadion towards Dęblin
Warszawa Śródmieście towards Góra Kalwaria or Skarżysko-Kamienna	R8	Warszawa Stadion towards Warszawa Wschodnia
Warszawa Śródmieście towards Góra Kalwaria or Skarżysko-Kamienna	RE8	Warszawa Stadion towards Warszawa Wschodnia
Warszawa Śródmieście towards Warszawa Zachodnia	R9	Warszawa Stadion towards Działdowo
Preceding station	SKM Warsaw	Following station
Warszawa Śródmieście towards Warsaw Chopin Airport	S2	Warszawa Stadion towards Sulejówek Miłosna
Location
- Location of station in Warsaw

Warszawa Powiśle, in English Warsaw Powiśle, is an urban railway station in Warsaw, Poland. Located in the neighborhood of Powiśle in borough of Śródmieście (Downtown), stretching between Aleje Jerozolimskie near Rondo Charles'a de Gaulle'a (high-level entrance), and the intersection of Aleja 3 Maja and ul. Kruczkowskiego (low-level entrance).

== Details ==
The station sits on a rail embankment extending from the terrace of the Vistula river on which the city centre is built, ending at its western side with the entrance to the Cross-City tunnel. The station has two side platforms flanking the suburban tracks of the Warsaw Cross-City Line used by the regional and suburban trains run by Masovian Railways and Rapid Urban Railway (Warsaw). The mainline tracks can be seen from the station. They are located behind a fence, which extends for the length of the station. The station building was designed in 1955, by architects Arseniusz Romanowicz and Piotr Szymaniak. The location allows for convenient transfers to city trams and buses serving the eastern part of the city centre.

The station is used for passing mainline trains, when there are engineering works on the mainline. Suburban trains may skip the station and use the mainline tracks, if there are engineering works on the suburban tracks. There is no connection between the suburban and mainline tracks at the station or immediately before or after it.

== The café-bar ==
In 2009, the club-and-restaurant company Grupa Warszawa opened a café-bar in the station's renovated former ticket office rented from the Polish State Railways. The bar has become one of the most popular venues in Warsaw. In 2013, Gazeta Wyborcza called the Warszawa Powiśle one of the "10 pubs that changed Warsaw."
