= Warszawa Ochota railway station =

Railway station in Warsaw, Poland

Warszawa Ochota
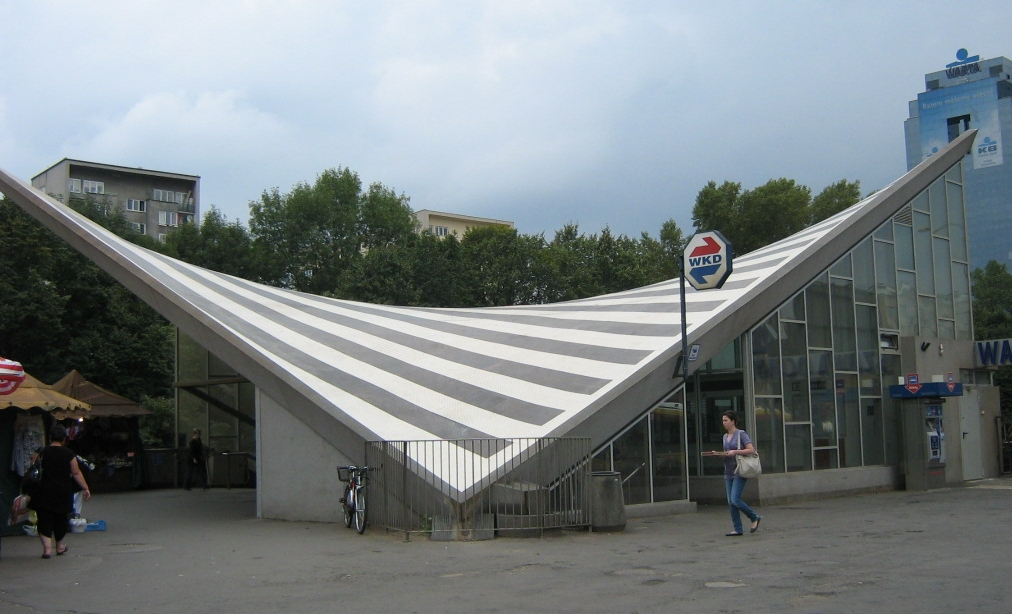

General information
- Location: Ochota, Warsaw, Masovian; Poland
- Coordinates: 52.225833°N 20.991111°E
- System: B
- Owner: Polskie Koleje Państwowe S.A.
- Platforms: 2

History
- Opened: 1963

Services
Preceding station	Masovian Railways	Following station
Warszawa Zachodnia towards Skierniewice	R1	Warszawa Śródmieście towards Warszawa Wschodnia
Warszawa Zachodnia Terminus	R2	Warszawa Śródmieście towards Łuków
Warszawa Zachodnia towards Kutno	R3	Warszawa Śródmieście towards Warszawa Wschodnia
Warszawa Zachodnia Terminus	R6	Warszawa Śródmieście towards Czyżew
Warszawa Zachodnia Terminus	R7	Warszawa Śródmieście towards Dęblin
Preceding station	SKM Warsaw	Following station
Warszawa Zachodnia towards Warsaw Chopin Airport	S2	Warszawa Śródmieście towards Sulejówek Miłosna
Location

Warsaw Ochota (Polish: Warszawa Ochota) is a railway station in Warsaw, Poland, located in the district of Ochota at Plac Zawiszy on the corner of Aleje Jerozolimskie and Towarowa Street. The station lies in a cutting. It has two island platforms, one on the suburban tracks of the Warsaw Cross-City Line for the regional trains run by Masovian Railways and Rapid Urban Railway (Warsaw) and one for the Warsaw Commuter Railway light railway. The station building, at the street level, was constructed in 1963: it has a saddle roof in a distinct shape of a hyperbolic paraboloid. It was including escalator then. The location allows for convenient interchange with city trams and buses serving the western part of the city centre.

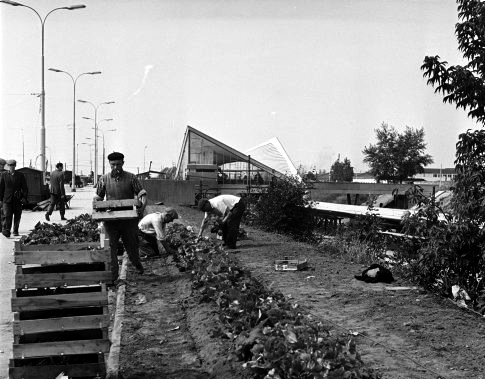
Railway station Warszawa Ochota was registered as a historical monument of modern architecture by the provincial conservator of monuments (2020).
