= Warsaw Cross-City Line =

Railway line in Poland

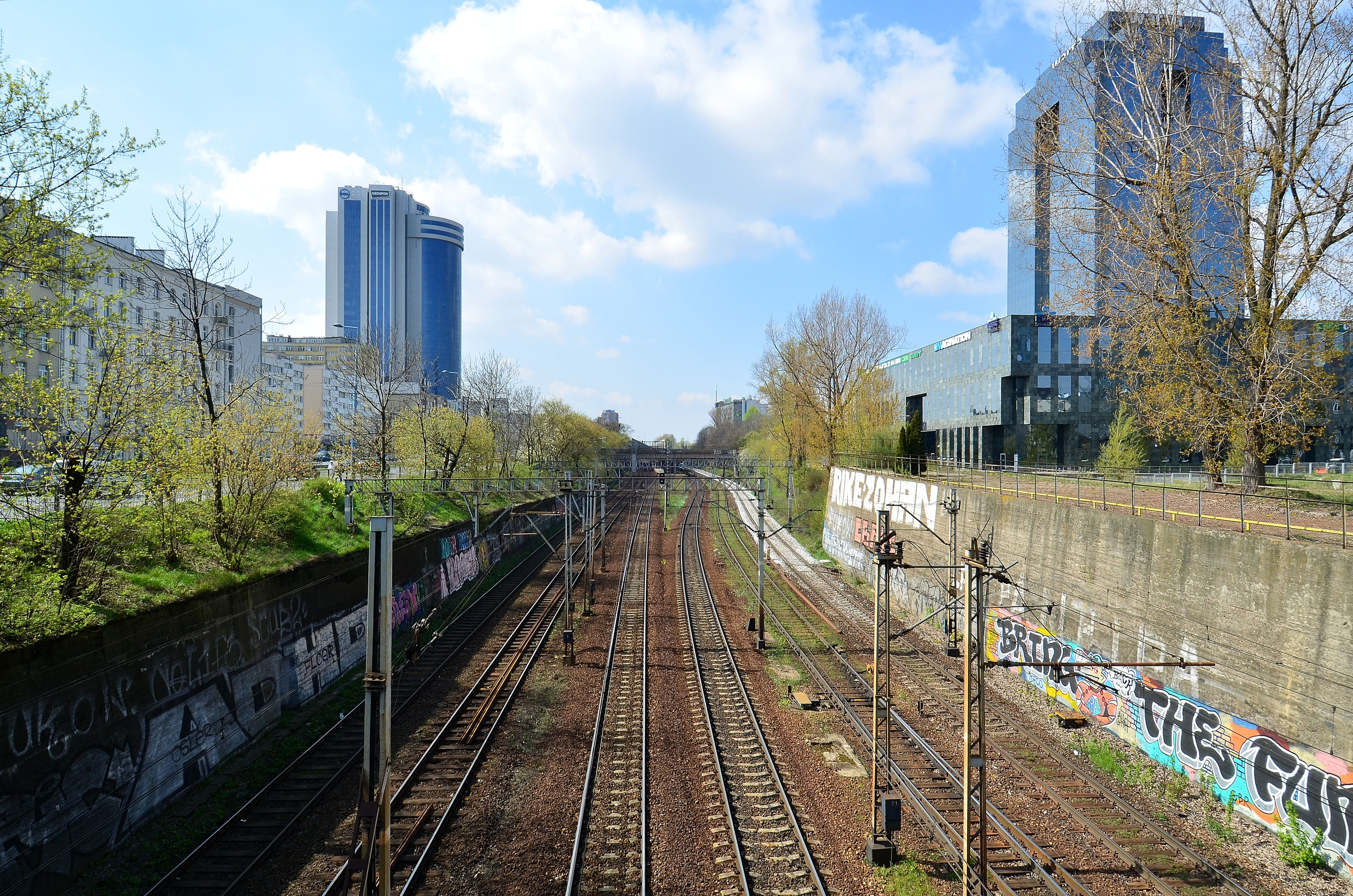
Warsaw Cross-City Line

Warsaw cross-city line (Polish: Linia Średnicowa w Warszawie) is a 7 km (4.3 mi) railway line crossing Central Warsaw in the east–west direction. Opened in 1933 and electrified in 1936, it initially had two tracks, with an additional two added in 1967. The central part of the line is in a tunnel, which is 2,226 m (7,303 ft 2 in) long. It then crosses the Vistula by the Średnicowy railway bridge 470.15 m (1,542 ft 6 in) long located between Poniatowski Bridge and Świętokrzyski Bridge.

The line provides a direct link between Warszawa Wschodnia and Warszawa Zachodnia stations. The pre-1945 Warszawa Główna was located approximately halfway down the line. The station has been replaced by Warszawa Śródmieście and later supplemented by Warszawa Centralna, which is located to the west of the old station.

Since the 1970s, the older (southern) pair of tracks is used by regional and commuter trains run (until 2005) by PKP/Polregio, and since then by Masovian Railways and Rapid Urban Railway (Warsaw). The regional trains use Warszawa Stadion, Warszawa Powiśle, Warszawa Śródmieście PKP and Warszawa Ochota stations (listed east-to-west), the long-distance trains use Warszawa Centralna. A third set of tracks, which extend as far as the Warszawa Śródmieście WKD railway station, is used by the Warszawska Kolej Dojazdowa (WKD) suburban light rail line.

The suburban tracks are designated by national railway infrastructure manager PKP Polskie Linie Kolejowe as PKP rail line 448 from Warszawa Zachodnia to Warszawa Rembertów through Warszawa Wschodnia, the long distance tracks are a part of PKP rail line 2 (Warszawa Zachodnia - Terespol), while the light rail tracks are PKP rail line 47 (Warszawa Śródmieście WKD - Grodzisk Mazowiecki Radońska).

== Gallery ==
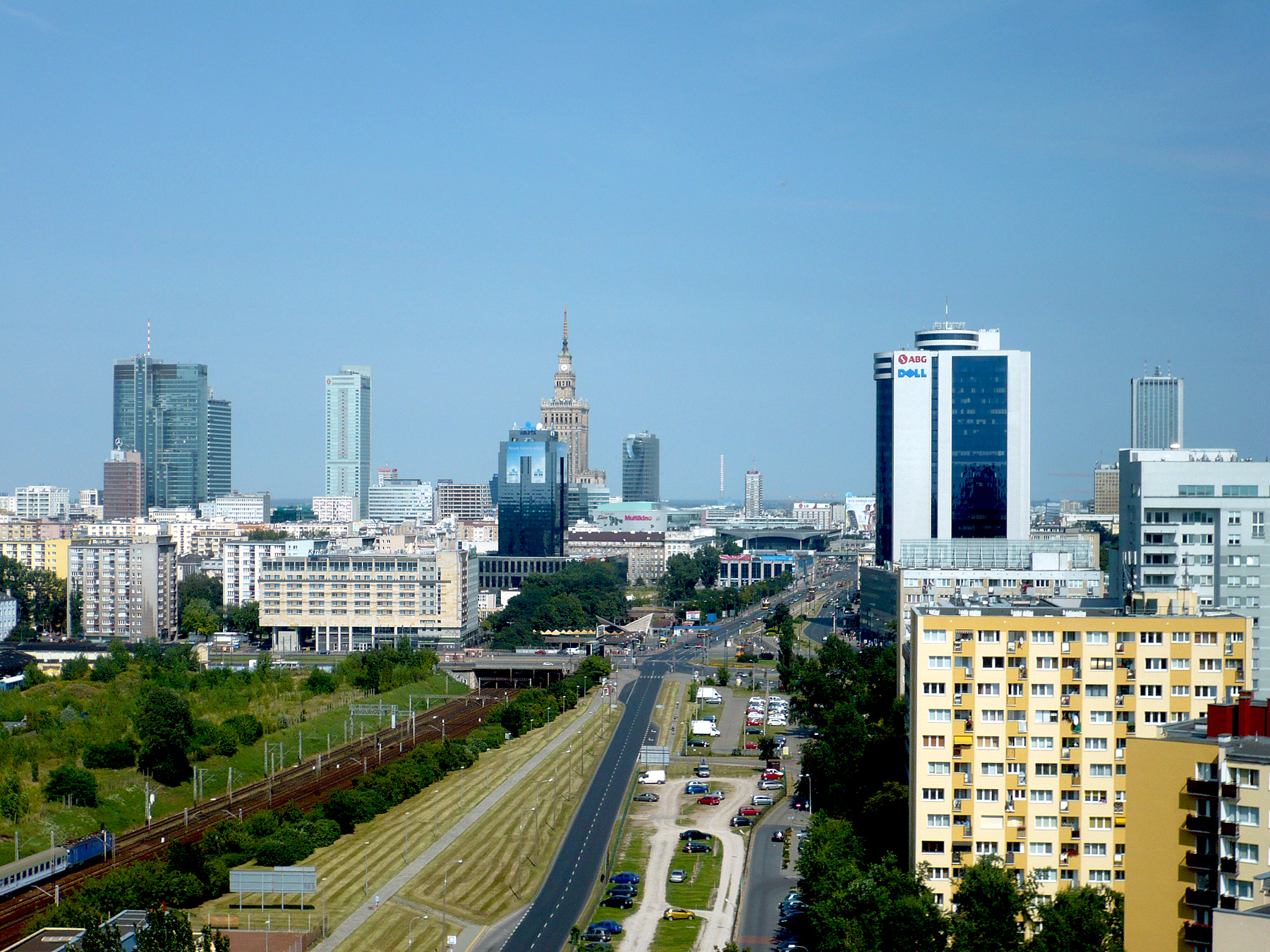
Western part of the Cross-City line running in a cutting

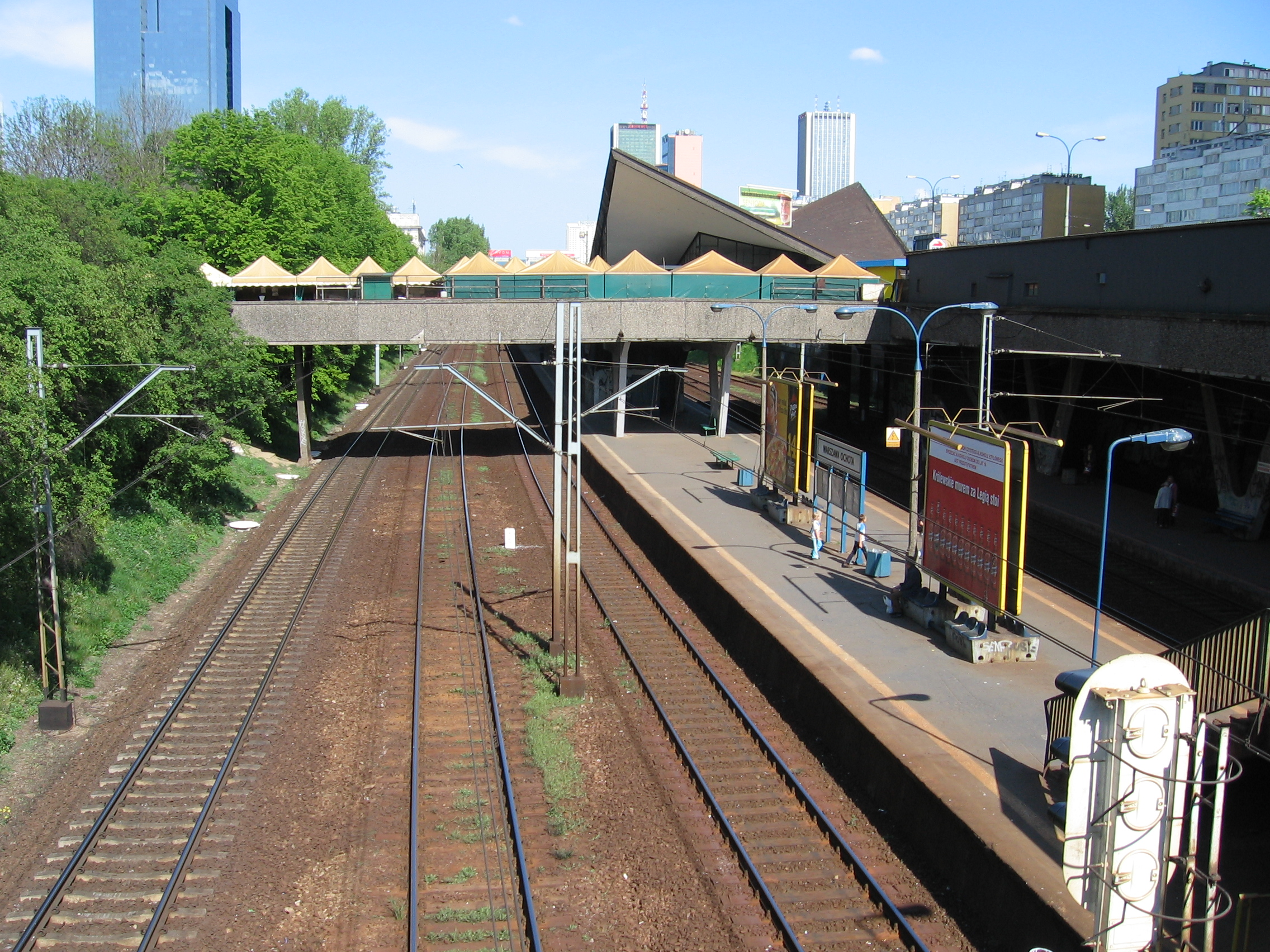
Cross-City line at Warszawa Ochota station

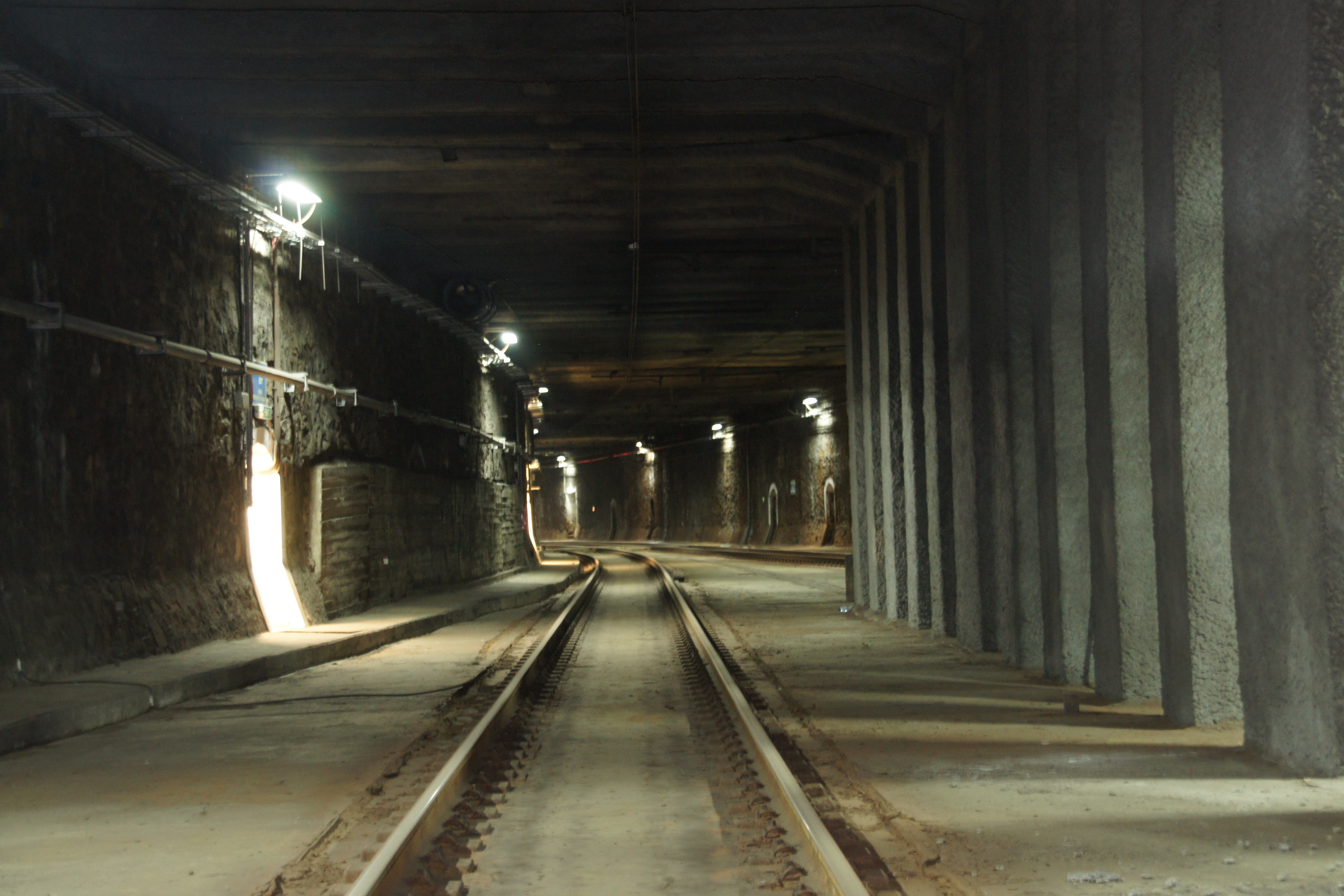
Cross city tunnel seen at Warszawa Śródmieście station

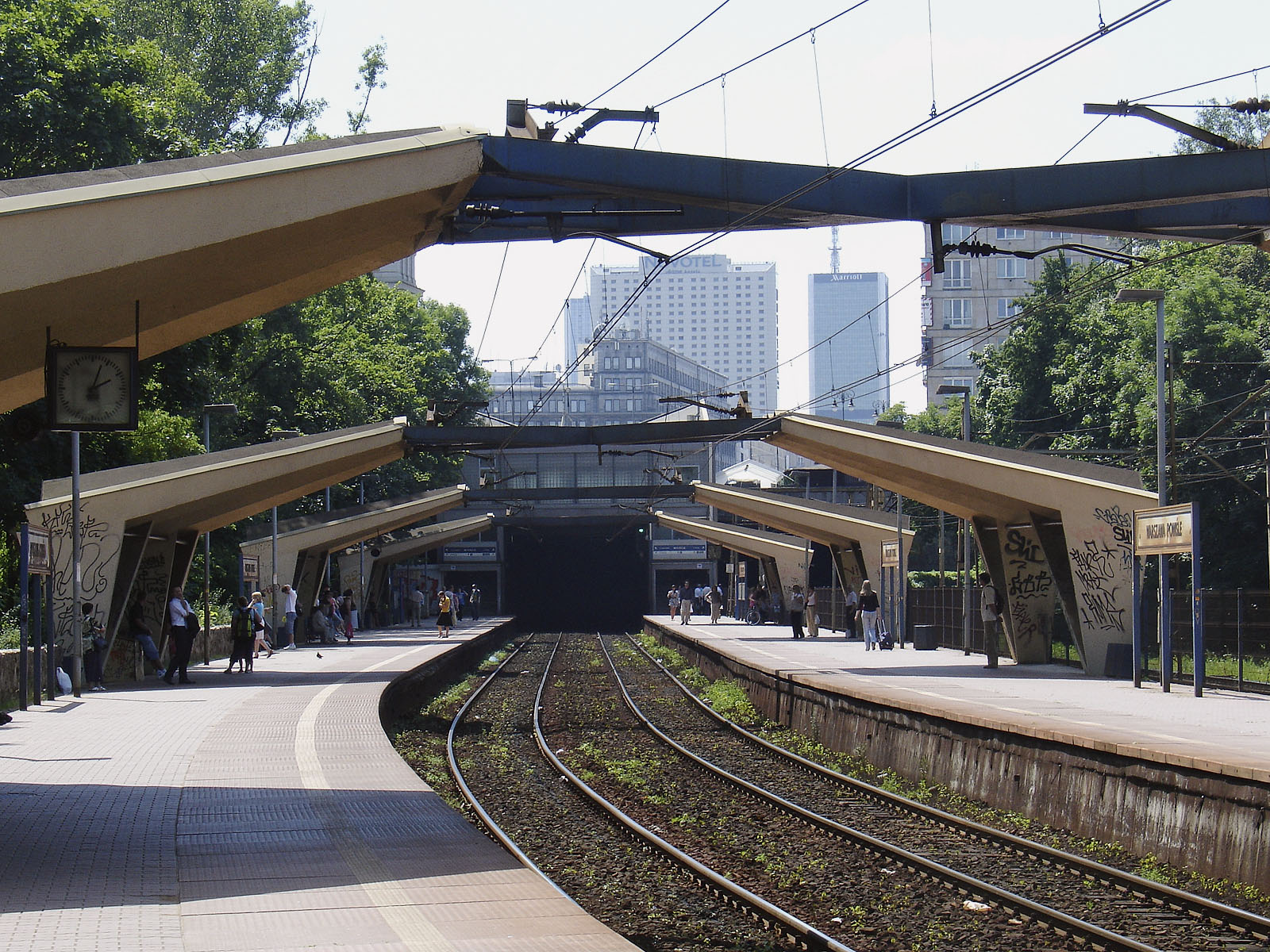
Mouth of the cross city tunnel at Warszawa Powiśle station

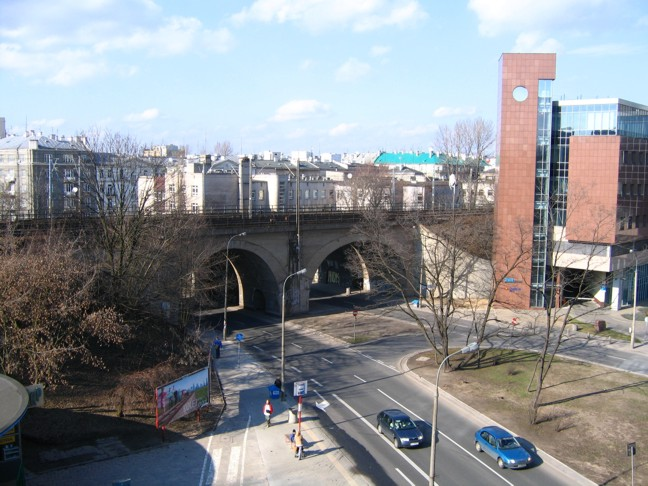
Viaduct over Kruczkowskiego street in Powiśle

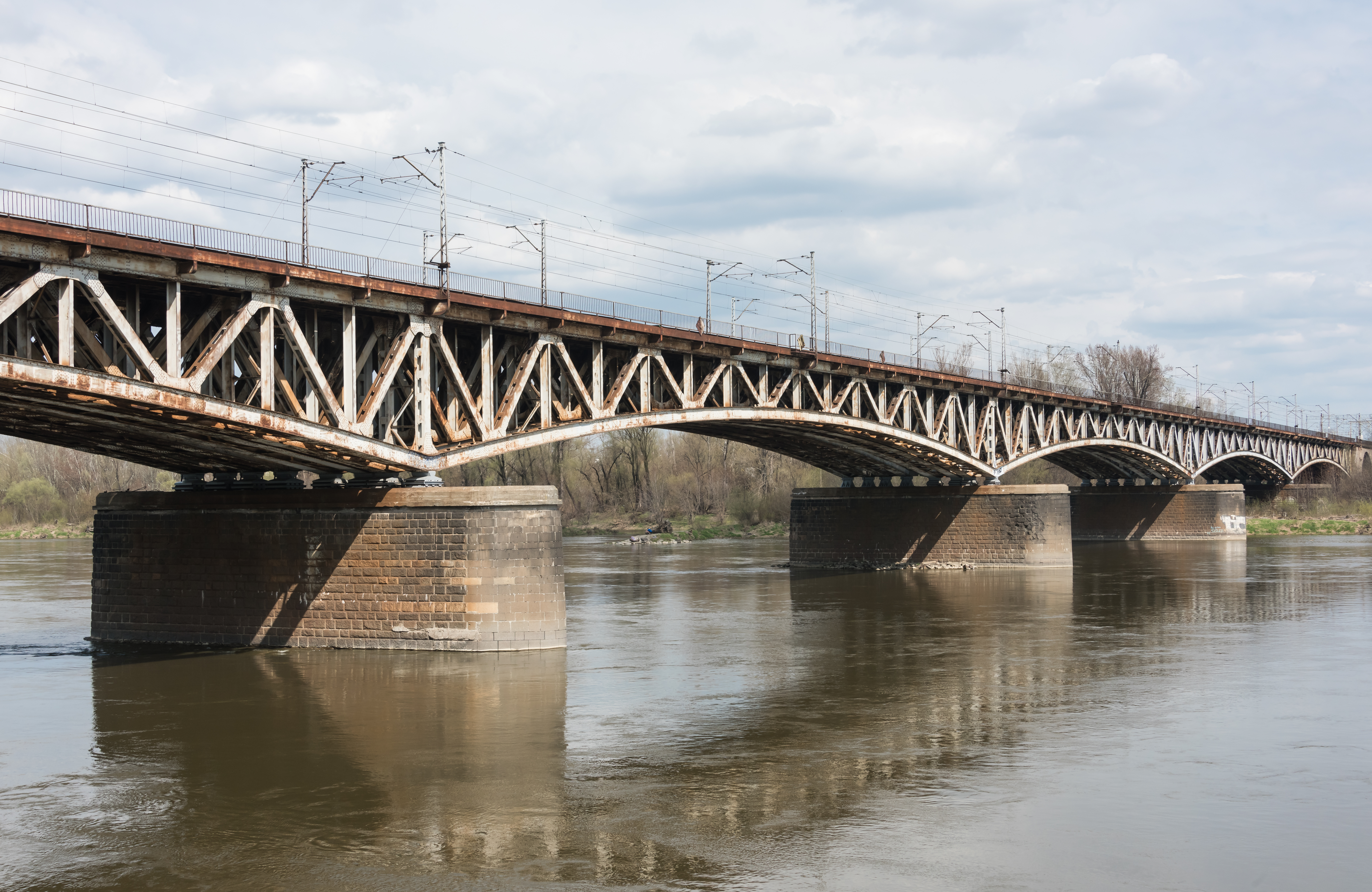
Średnicowy Bridge crossing the Vistula River
