= Warszawa Stadion railway station =

Railway station in Warsaw, Poland

Warszawa Stadion
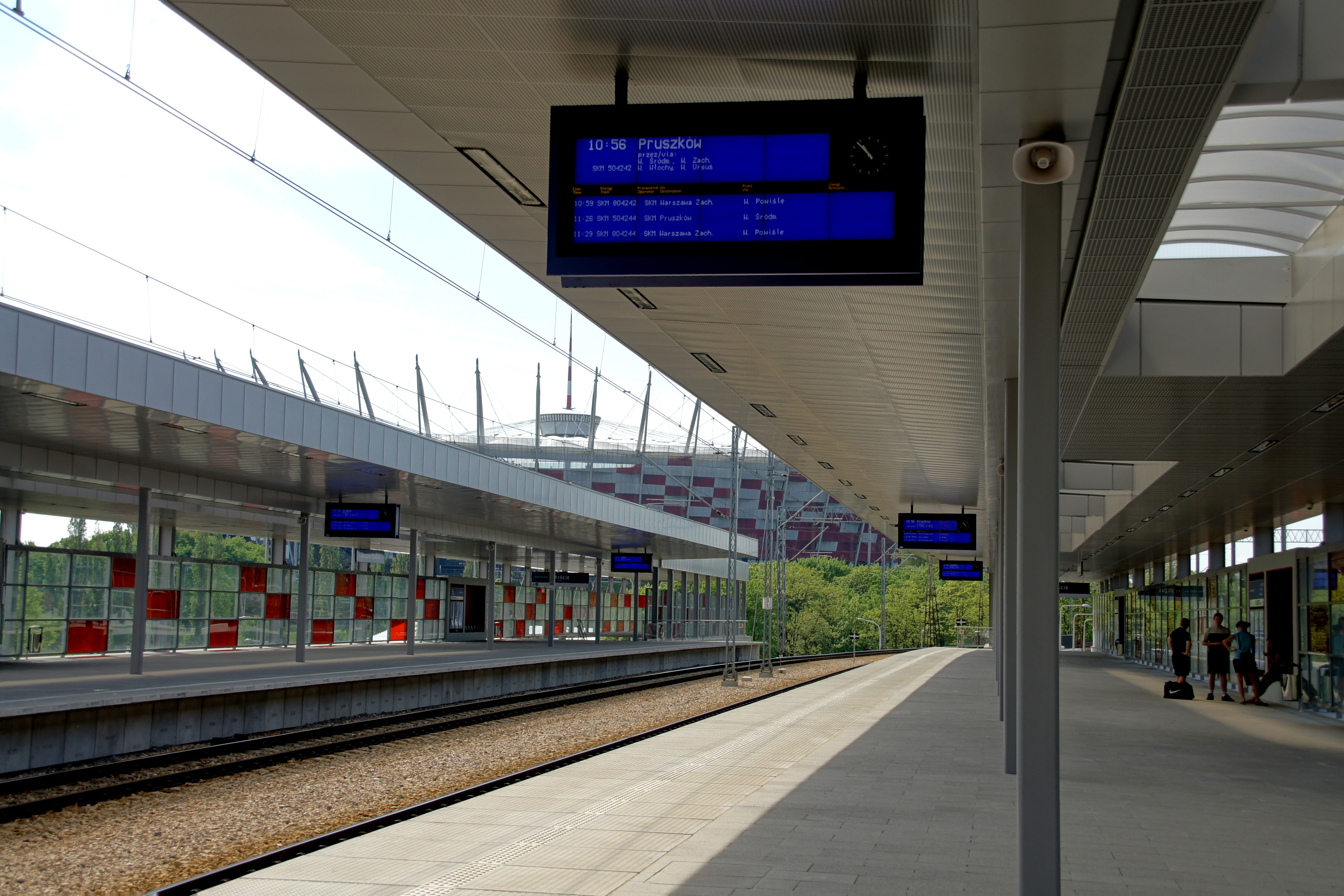

General information
- Location: Praga-Południe, Warsaw, Masovian; Poland
- Coordinates: 52°14′40″N 21°02′38″E
- System: D
- Owner: Polskie Koleje Państwowe S.A.
- Platforms: 2
- Tracks: 2
- Connections: Stadion Narodowy

History
- Opened: 1955
Services
Preceding station	Masovian Railways	Following station
Warszawa Powiśle towards Skierniewice	R1	Warszawa Wschodnia Terminus
Warszawa Powiśle towards Warszawa Zachodnia	R2	Warszawa Wschodnia towards Łuków
Warszawa Powiśle towards Kutno	R3	Warszawa Wschodnia Terminus
Warszawa Powiśle towards Warszawa Zachodnia	R6	Warszawa Wschodnia towards Czyżew
Warszawa Powiśle towards Warszawa Zachodnia	R7	Warszawa Wschodnia towards Dęblin
Warszawa Powiśle towards Góra Kalwaria or Skarżysko-Kamienna	R8	Warszawa Wschodnia Terminus
Warszawa Powiśle towards Góra Kalwaria or Skarżysko-Kamienna	RE8	Warszawa Wschodnia Terminus
Warszawa Powiśle towards Warszawa Zachodnia	R9	Warszawa Wschodnia towards Działdowo
Preceding station	SKM Warsaw	Following station
Warszawa Powiśle towards Warsaw Chopin Airport	S2	Warszawa Wschodnia towards Sulejówek Miłosna
Location
- Location of station in Warsaw

Warszawa Stadion, in English Warsaw Stadium, is a railway station in Warsaw, Poland, located in the district of Praga-Południe, close to the Kazimierz Górski National Stadium (Stadion Narodowy). The station has two side platforms flanking the suburban tracks of the Warsaw Cross-City Line. The platforms are used by regional trains run by Masovian Railways and Rapid Urban Railway (Warsaw). The station building was designed by Arseniusz Romanowicz and Piotr Szymaniak and was opened between 1955 and 1958, to serve Stadion Dziesięciolecia. The station was renovated shortly before the UEFA Euro 2012 football championships. It is also close to the Stadion Narodowy metro station, which opened on 8 March 2015.
