= Warszawa Śródmieście railway station =

Railway station in Warsaw, Poland

Warszawa Śródmieście
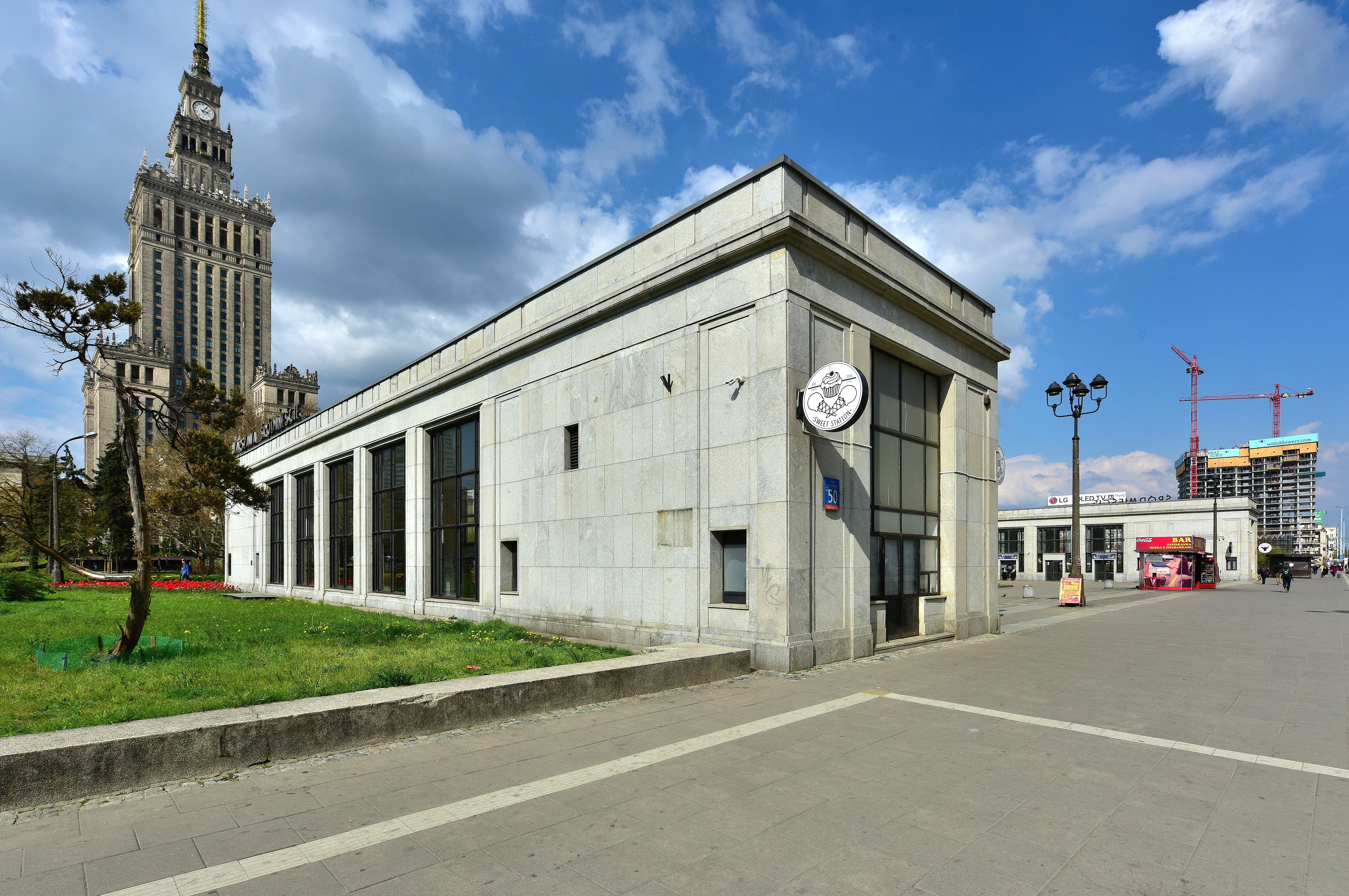

General information
- Location: Śródmieście, Warsaw, Masovian; Poland
- Coordinates: 52.229444°N 21.007778°E
- Line: Warsaw Cross-City Line
- Platforms: 3
- Tracks: 2
- Connections: Warszawa Centralna; Centrum; Warszawa Śródmieście WKD

History
- Opened: 1949 (rebuilt 1955–1963)
Services
| Preceding station | Masovian Railways | Following station |
|---|---|---|
| Warszawa Ochota towards Skierniewice | R1 | Warszawa Powiśle towards Warszawa Wschodnia |
| Warszawa Ochota towards Warszawa Zachodnia | R2 | Warszawa Powiśle towards Łuków |
| Warszawa Ochota towards Kutno | R3 | Warszawa Powiśle towards Warszawa Wschodnia |
| Warszawa Ochota towards Warszawa Zachodnia | R6 | Warszawa Powiśle towards Czyżew |
| Warszawa Ochota towards Warszawa Zachodnia | R7 | Warszawa Powiśle towards Dęblin |
| Warszawa Ochota towards Góra Kalwaria or Skarżysko-Kamienna | R8 | Warszawa Powiśle towards Warszawa Wschodnia |
| Warszawa Ochota towards Góra Kalwaria or Skarżysko-Kamienna | RE8 | Warszawa Powiśle towards Warszawa Wschodnia |
| Warszawa Ochota towards Warszawa Zachodnia | R9 | Warszawa Powiśle towards Działdowo |
| Preceding station | SKM Warsaw | Following station |
| Warszawa Ochota towards Warsaw Chopin Airport | S2 | Warszawa Powiśle towards Sulejówek Miłosna |
Route map
Location

Warszawa Śródmieście railway station (Polish pronunciation: [ɕrudˈmjɛɕt͡ɕɛ]) is a railway station in Warsaw, Poland, in the district of Śródmieście. The station serves the suburban (southern) tracks of the Warsaw Cross-City Line and is used by regional trains run by Masovian Railways (KM) and Szybka Kolej Miejska (SKM). There are two side platforms and one island platform serving two tracks, all located in a tunnel.

It was built on the principle of the Spanish solution, whereas the centre platform would be using for the arriving passengers only and the side platforms for departing passengers only. The separation was enforced by access controls to the centre platform (discontinued in 1960s), location of ticket offices next to side platforms only, and opening trains' doors on the centre platform side first and on the side platform side with a delay. The separation was in operation until the 1980s.

Warszawa Śródmieście PKP on map of the city's rail network.

== History ==
The first station with this name opened in 1949 in a cutting (now covered) on the Warsaw Cross-City Line between Marchlewskiego (currently Jana Pawła II) and Emilii Plater streets, a few hundred meters to the west of the current location and roughly on the site of the former Vienna station (pl). It had two side platforms and a simple wooden station building on the street level. It served both suburban and long-distance trains.

The present structure was built between 1955 and 1963, based on the designs of architects Arseniusz Romanowicz and Piotr Szymaniak (overground portion) and Warsaw Academy of Fine Arts artists and alumni Wojciech Fangor, Jerzy Sołtan, Zbigniew Ihnatowicz, Wiktor Gessler, Adolf Szczepiński, Bogusław Smyrski and Lech Tomaszewski (underground portion). The overground part consists of two rectangular buildings without any facilities, being effectively oversized shelters for staircases leading to the platforms, ticket offices, etc. The station underwent a refurbishment in 2006–07.

== Connections ==
The station offers convenient ground-level transfers to the nearby Centrum metro station as well as a large number of trams and buses. The station is connected by an underground pedestrian passage to Warszawa Centralna, which serves long-distance trains, and Warszawa Śródmieście WKD, which serves Warszawska Kolej Dojazdowa trains.

== Gallery ==
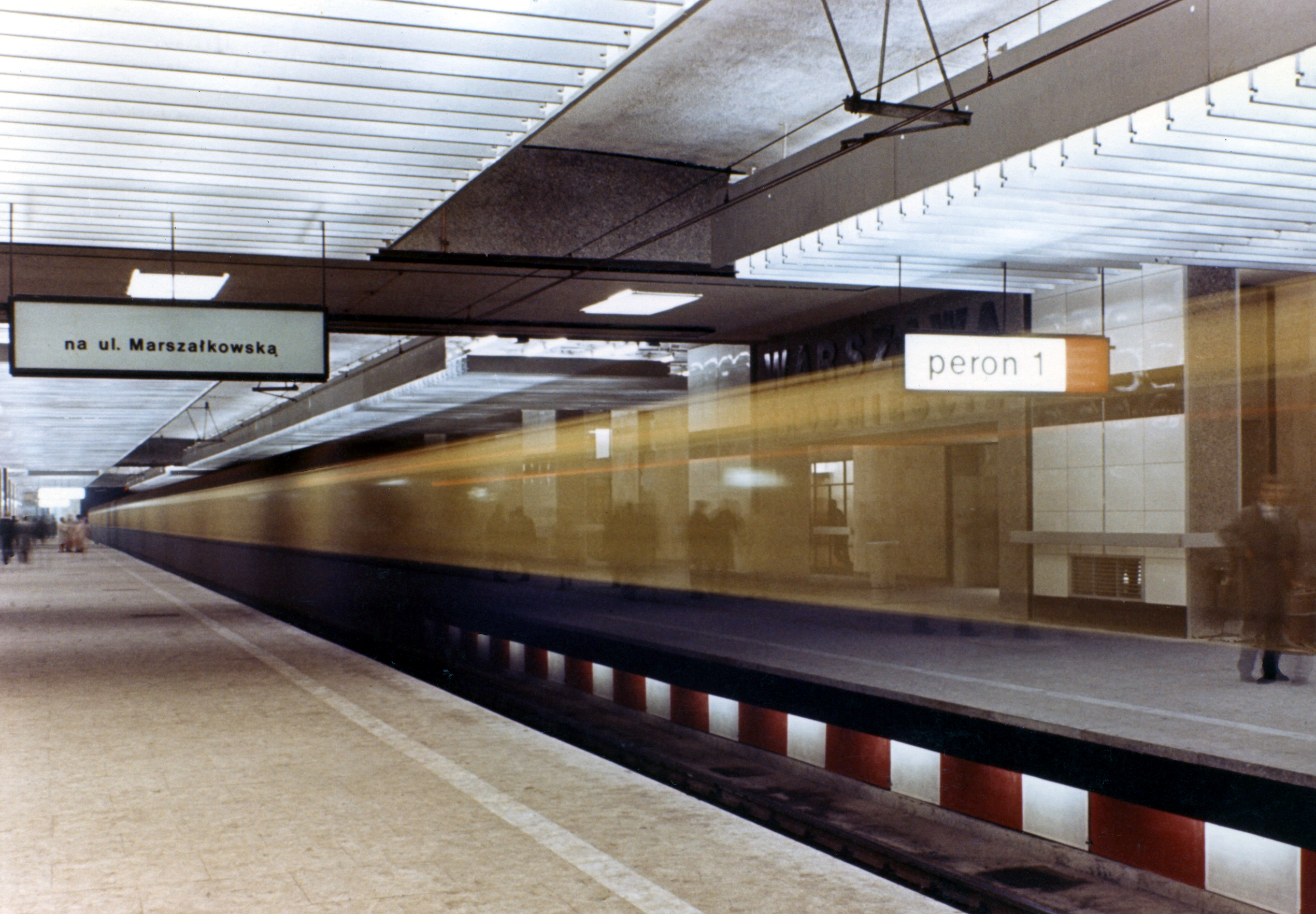
Station platforms in 1963. The edges of underground railway platforms were painted and backlighted by optical art painter Wojciech Fangor.

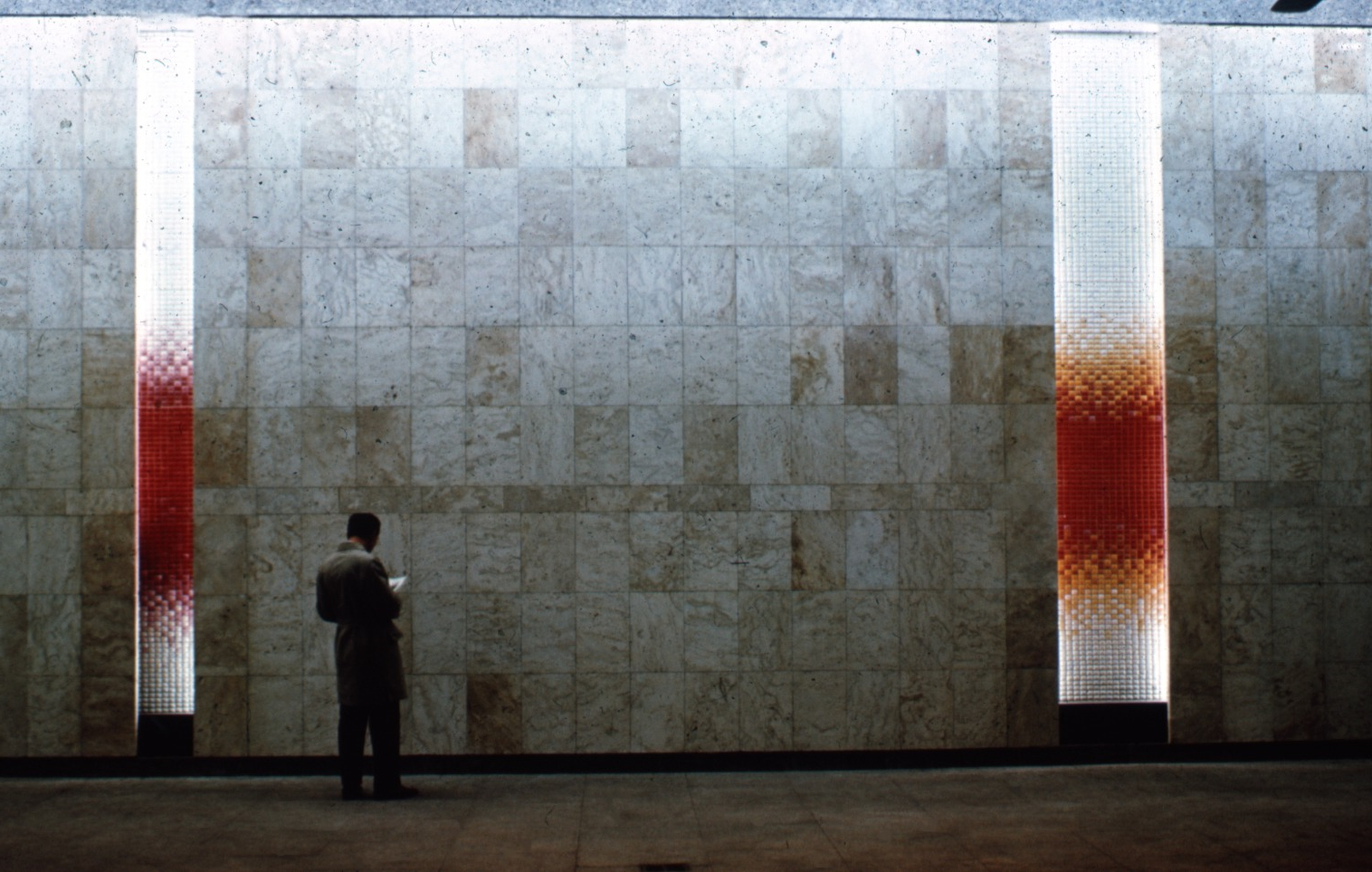
Illuminated ceramic mosaics by Wojciech Fangor in a ticket hall in 1963.

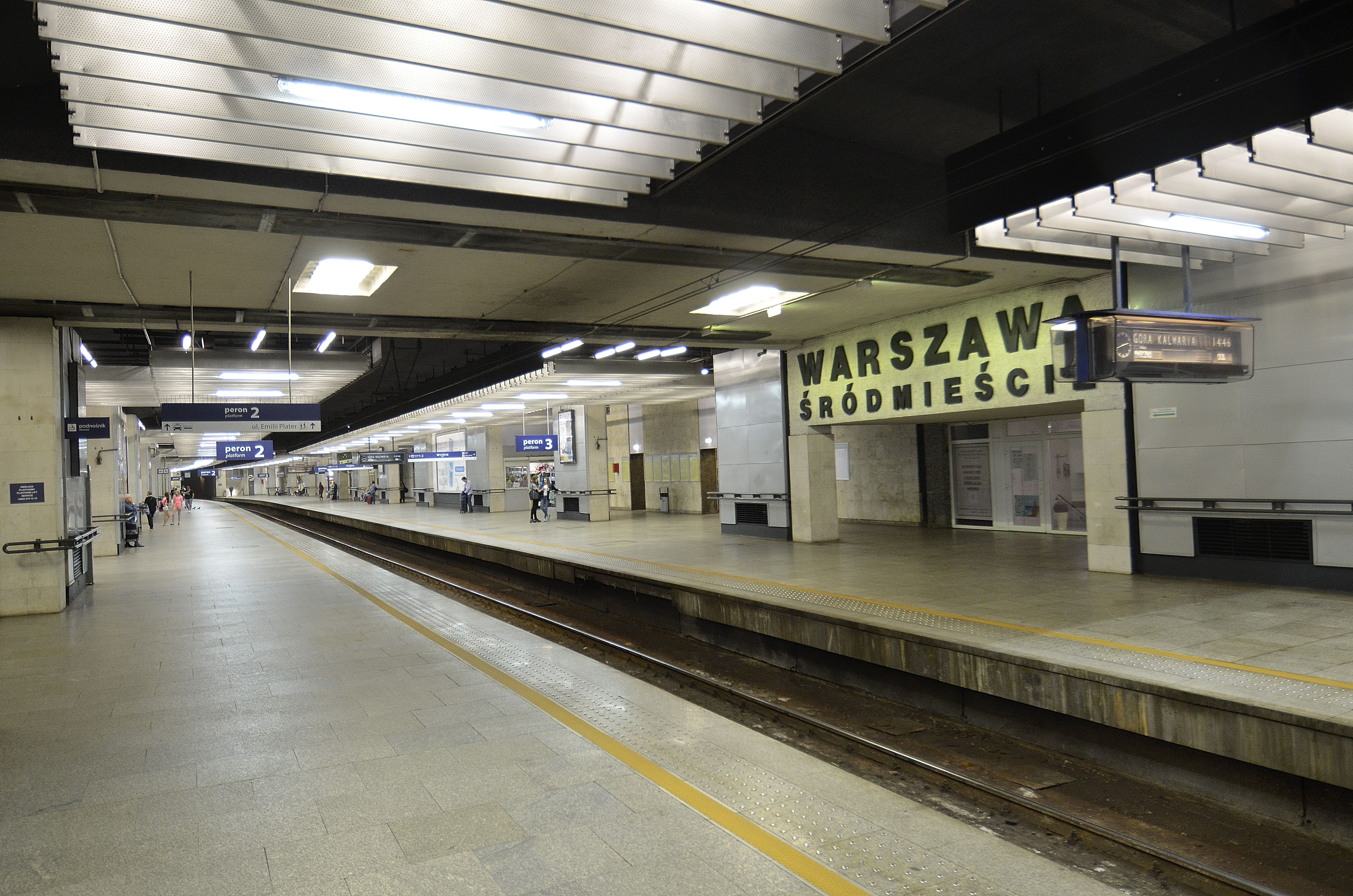
Station interior, platforms 2 and 3

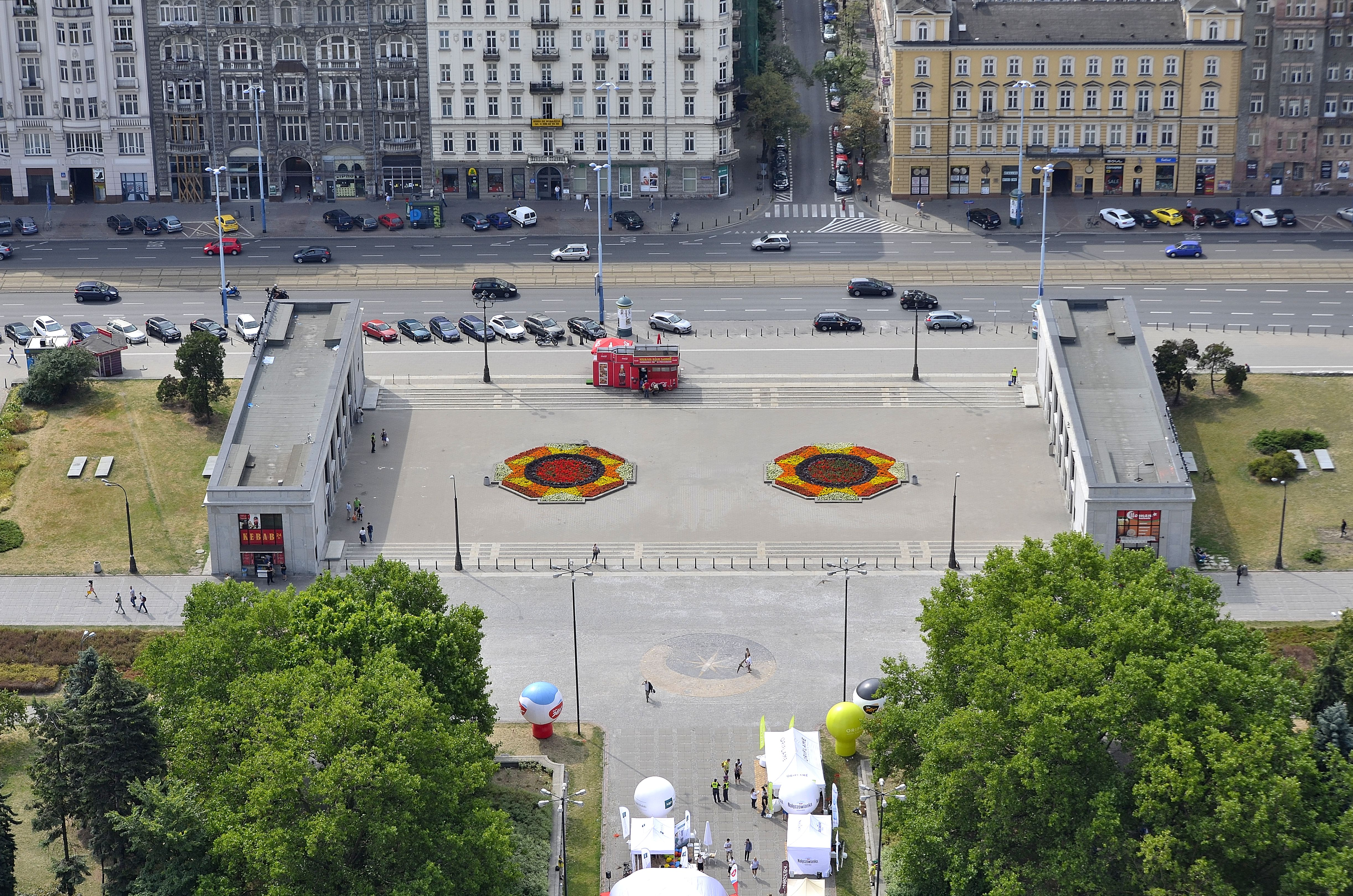
Aerial view of the station entrances

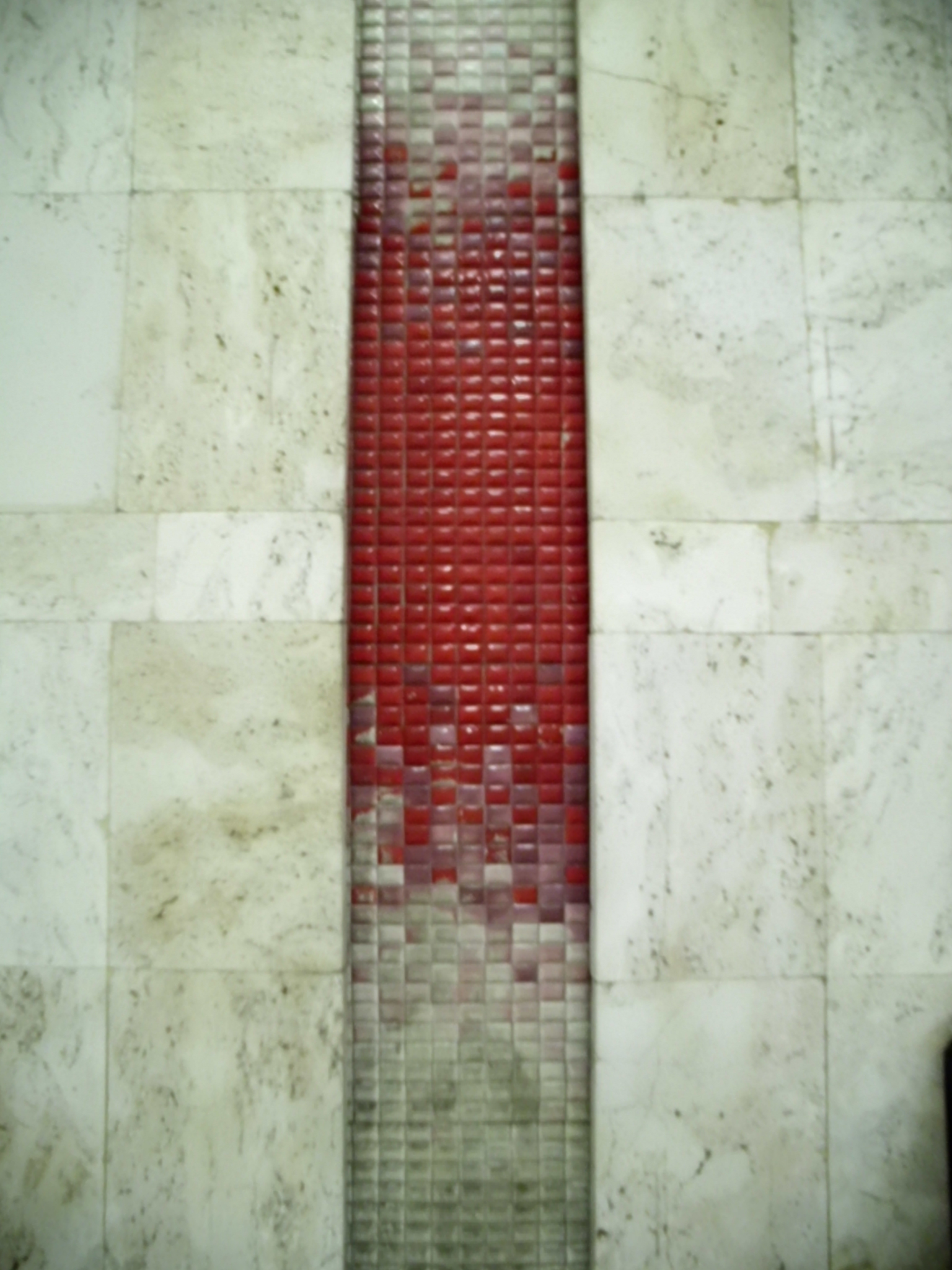
Mosaics by Wojciech Fangor

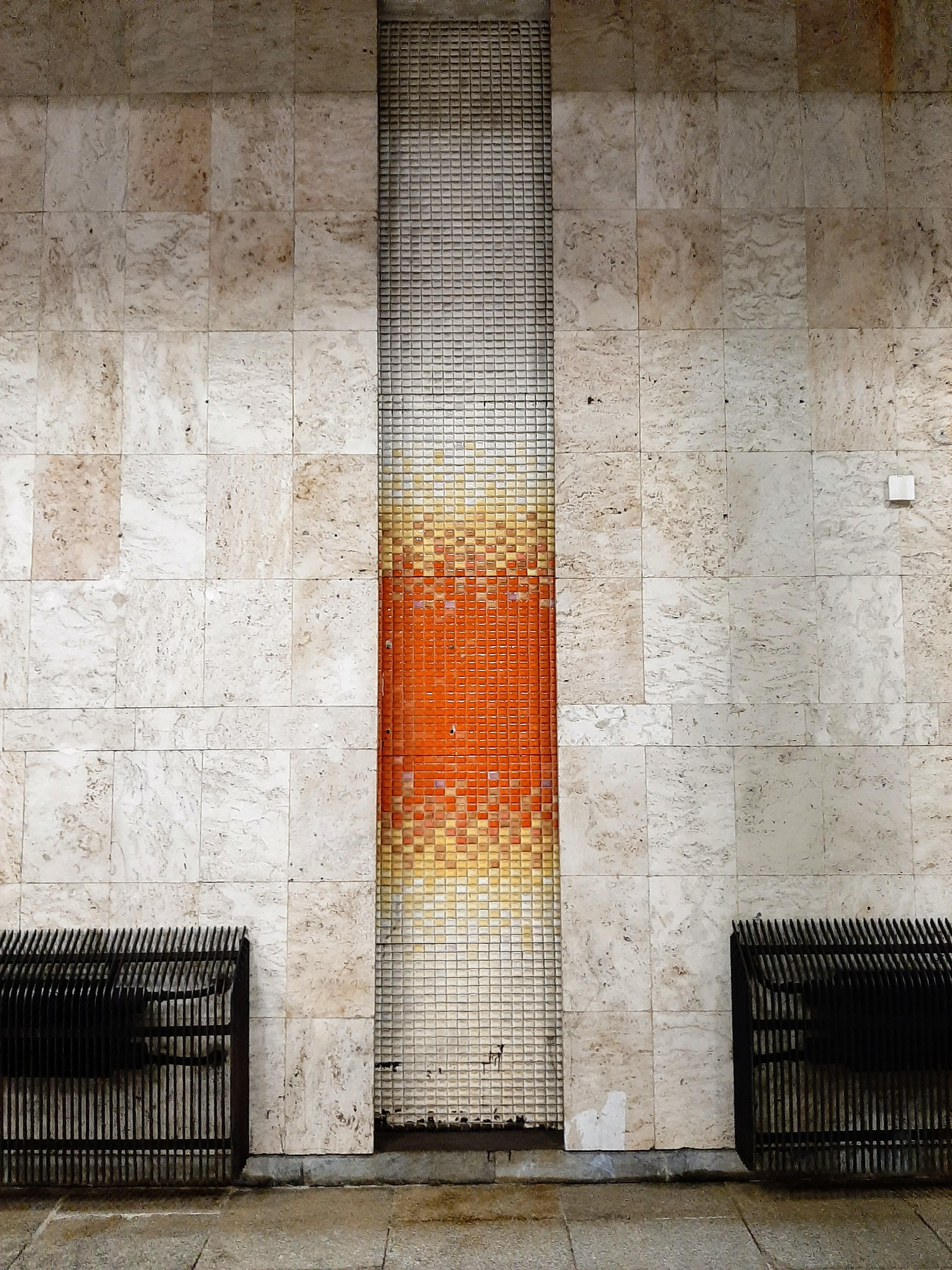
Mosaics by Wojciech Fangor

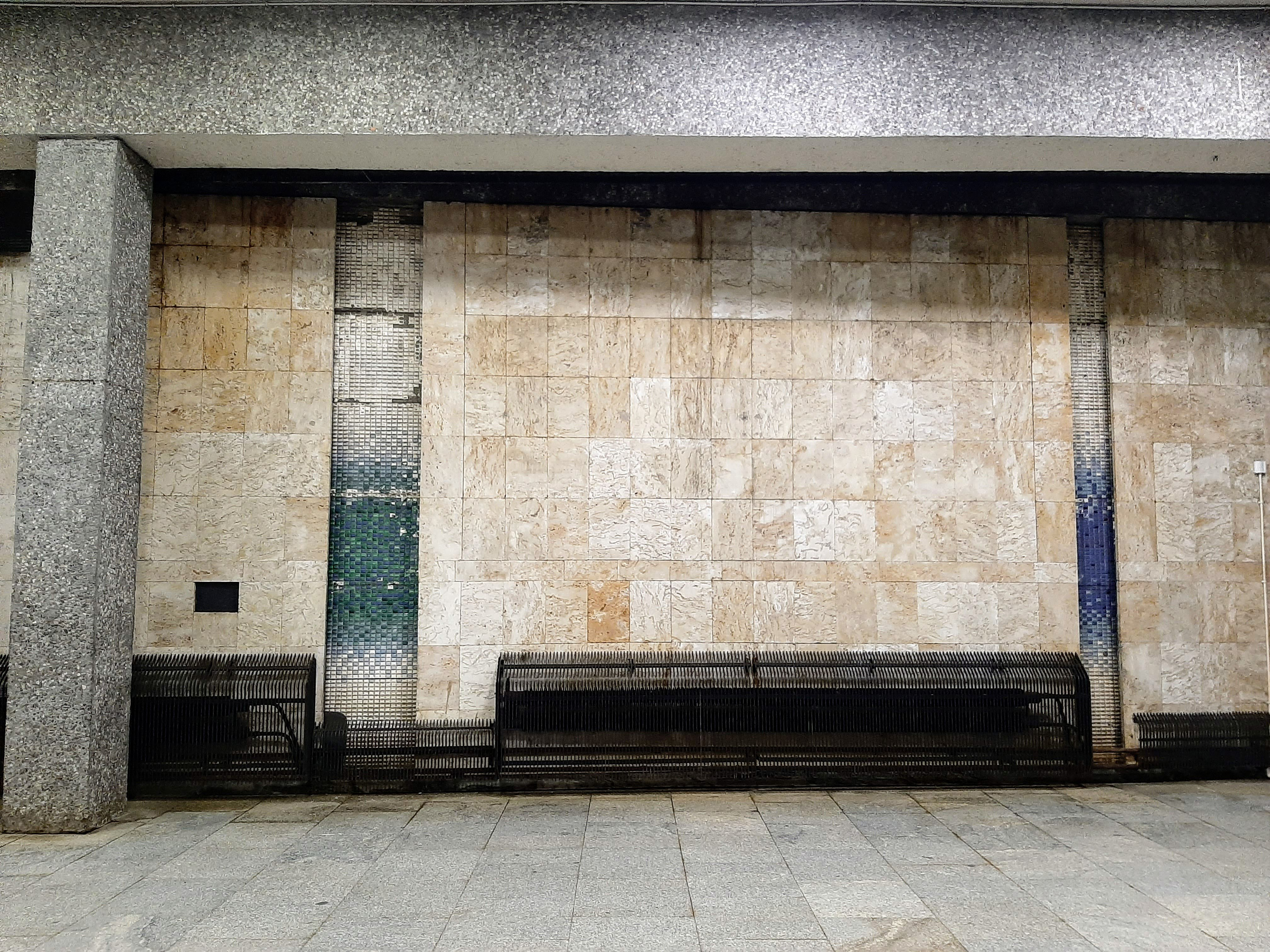
Ceramic mosaics by optical art painter Wojciech Fangor were created on the walls and also on the ceiling.
