= Warszawa Centralna railway station =

Railway station in Warsaw, Poland

Warszawa Centralna Warsaw Central
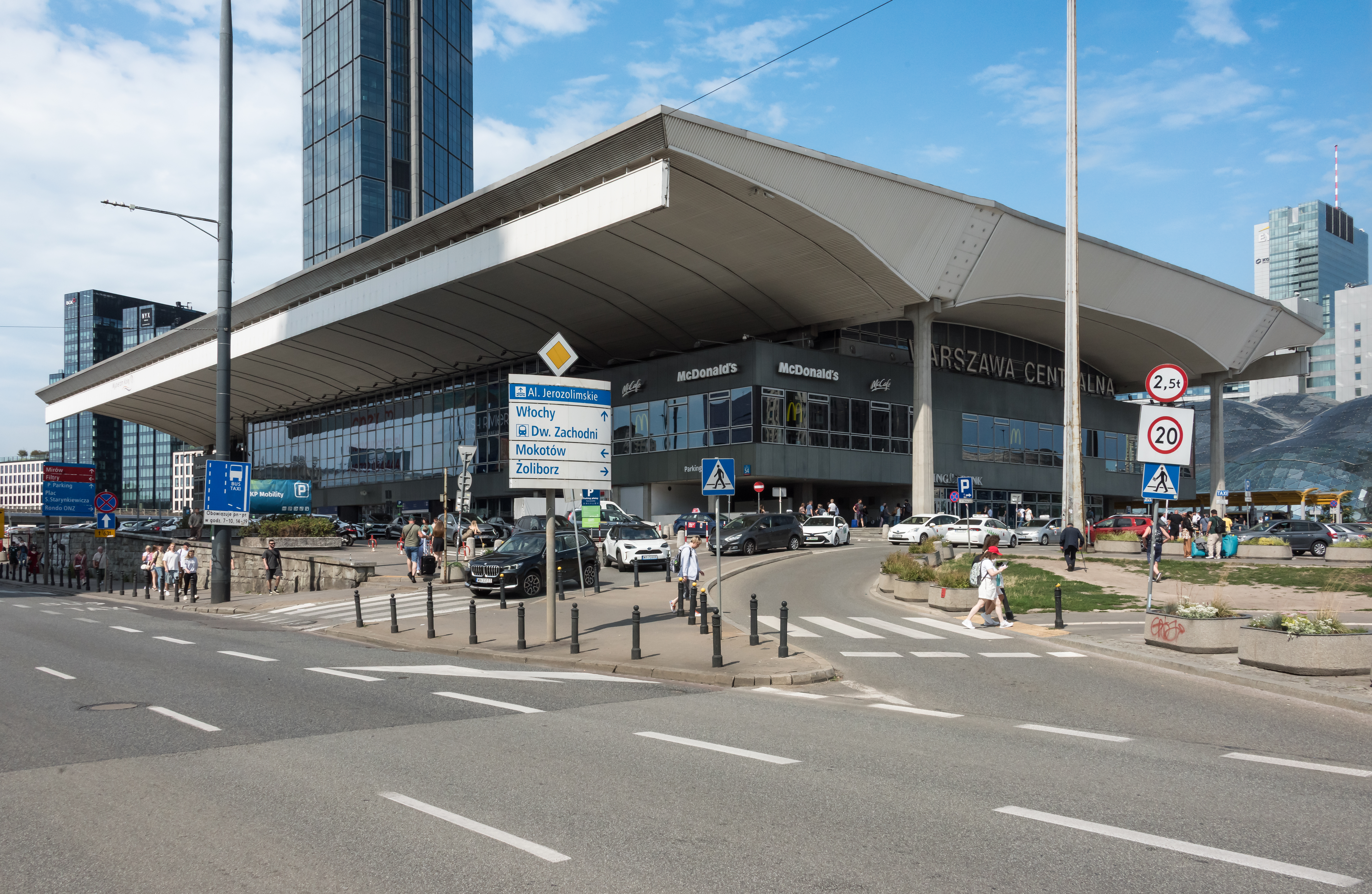
- Location of station in Warsaw, in 2025

General information
- Location: Al. Jerozolimskie 54, Warsaw, Masovian Voivodeship, Poland
- Coordinates: 52.228611°N 21.003056°E
- System: Railway Station
- Platforms: 4
- Tracks: 8
- Connections: Warszawa Śródmieście; Centrum; Warszawa Śródmieście WKD

Other information
- Classification: Premium

History
- Opened: 1975

Passengers
- 2024: 20 000 040
Route map
Location

Warszawa Centralna, (Note: Officially named Dworzec Centralny im. Stanisława Moniuszki since 2019.) in English known as Warsaw Central, is the primary railway station in Warsaw, Poland. Opened in 1975, the station is located on the Warsaw Cross-City Line and features four underground island platforms with eight tracks in total. It is served by the long-distance domestic and international trains of PKP Intercity and Polregio as well as some of the regional trains operated by Masovian Railways. Adjacent to the north side of the building is a bus station that serves as the central hub for night bus lines, and Złote Tarasy shopping centre.

== History ==
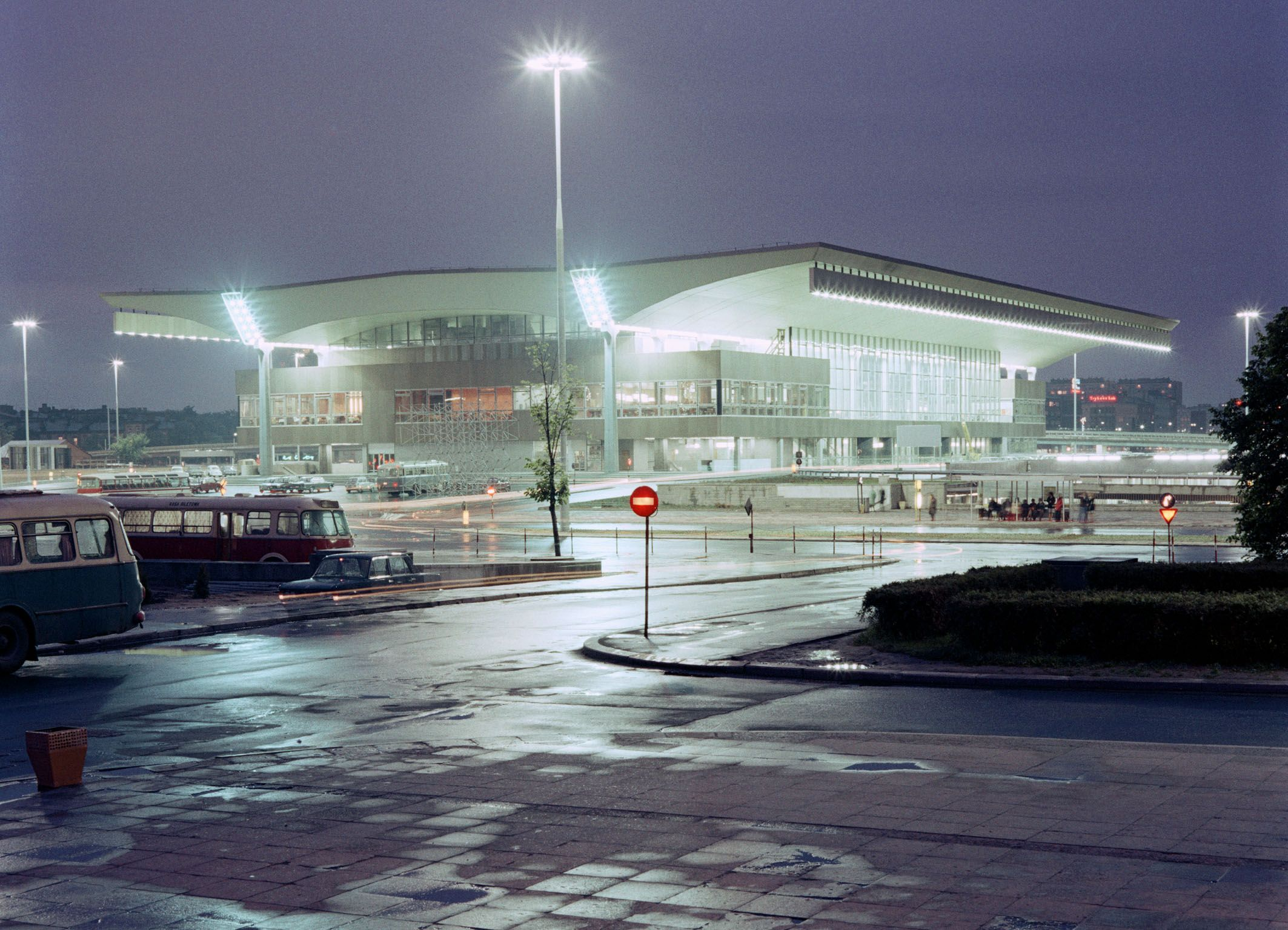
Warszawa Centralna in 1975. Swiss monthly magazine Hochparterre rated it as "Excellent public space: the main hall of the Warszawa Centralna railway station in its original shape." Railway station was registered as a historical monument of modern architecture by the provincial conservator of monuments (2019).

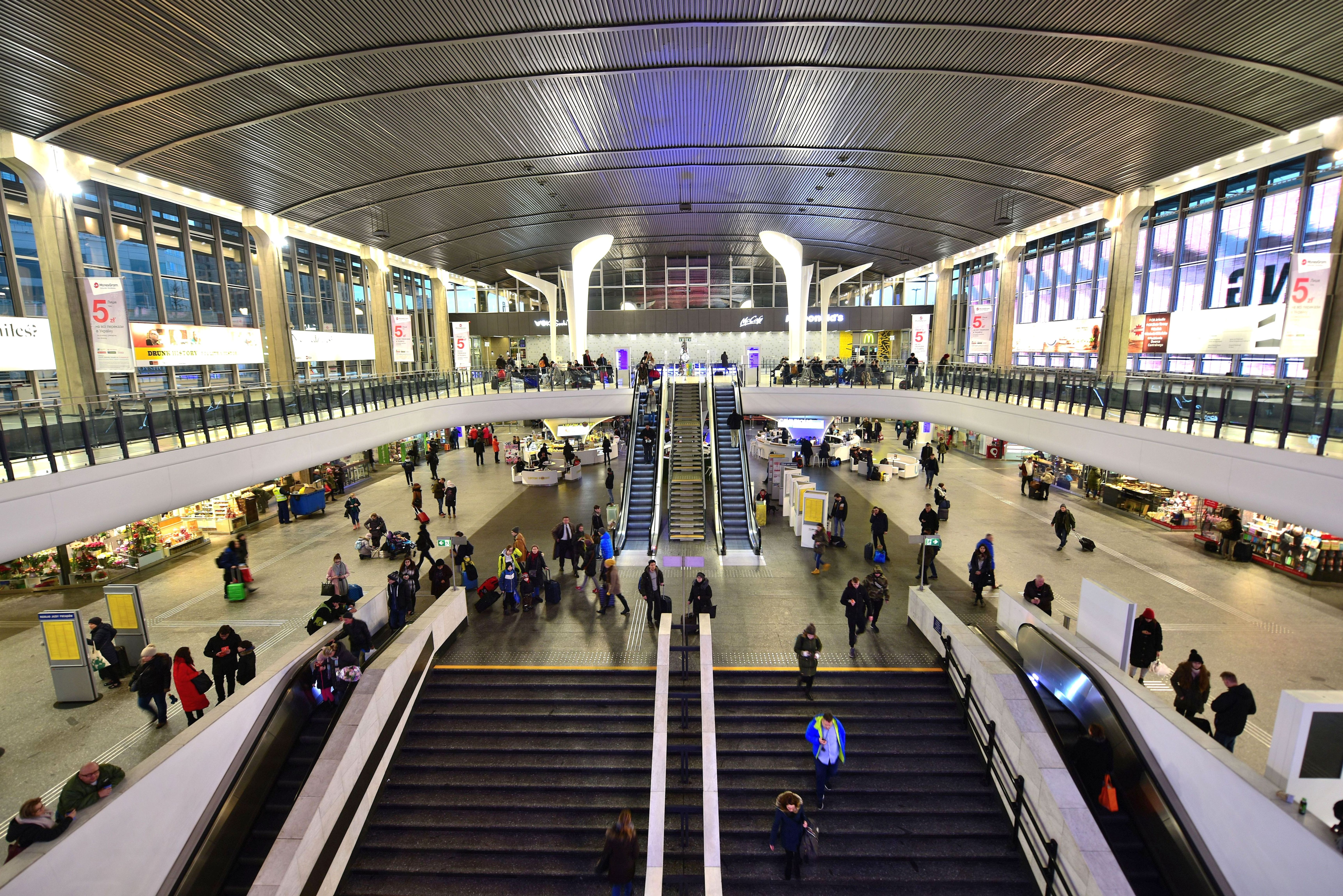
Main hall. The mezzanine was added between 2015 and 2016.

Warsaw Central was constructed as a flagship project of the Polish People's Republic during the 1970s economic boom, and was intended to replace the inadequate and obsolete Warszawa Główna railway station.

The station's design was innovative, but construction was plagued by continuous alterations to the scope of work which in turn hurt functionality and operations upon completion. It was a result of a hasty completion schedule, with the opening date set to coincide with Leonid Brezhnev's 1975 visit to Warsaw.. As planned, in 1975, Edward Gierek officially opened the railway station. However, the design and construction problems necessitated immediate repairs that would continue through the 1980s. The structure was fairly advanced for its time and incorporated such features as automatic doors, as well as escalators and double-sided elevators for each platform. Moreover, each platform was equipped with WC, public telephones and glazed waiting rooms with television sets and central heating system. The edges of the platforms were backlit, but this feature was later removed. There was also a marble fountain, which was also later removed. All benches are made of white marble.

The station was one of only a handful of public buildings in Warsaw which suffered a technical fault as a result of the millennium bug. The passenger information screen was switched off for approximately 24 hours on 1 January 2000 while its timing chip was replaced. In the meantime, all departures were announced over the public address system. The normal practice is for only international departures to be announced in this way. The story was originally reported in Gazeta Wyborcza on 4 January 2000.

After a period of decline, a cosmetic upgrade of the station in 2010–2011 was completed in time for the Euro 2012 championships. Between 2015 and 2016, a mezzanine connecting the waiting room in the west wing to the restaurants in the east wing was constructed. It has been both praised for improving the use of space in the main hall and criticized for its futuristic design, which clashes with the building's modernist architecture. The Warsaw city government is contemplating demolishing and replacing the station, either at the same location or farther from the city center. Some elements of the Warsaw press (e.g. Gazeta Wyborcza and Architektura Murator, 2012), as well as Swiss architect and journalist Werner Huber, have argued against demolition, claiming that the current Warszawa Centralna is a great example and a masterpiece of modernism in Poland.

The station is fully accessible to the disabled as well as passengers with heavy luggage.

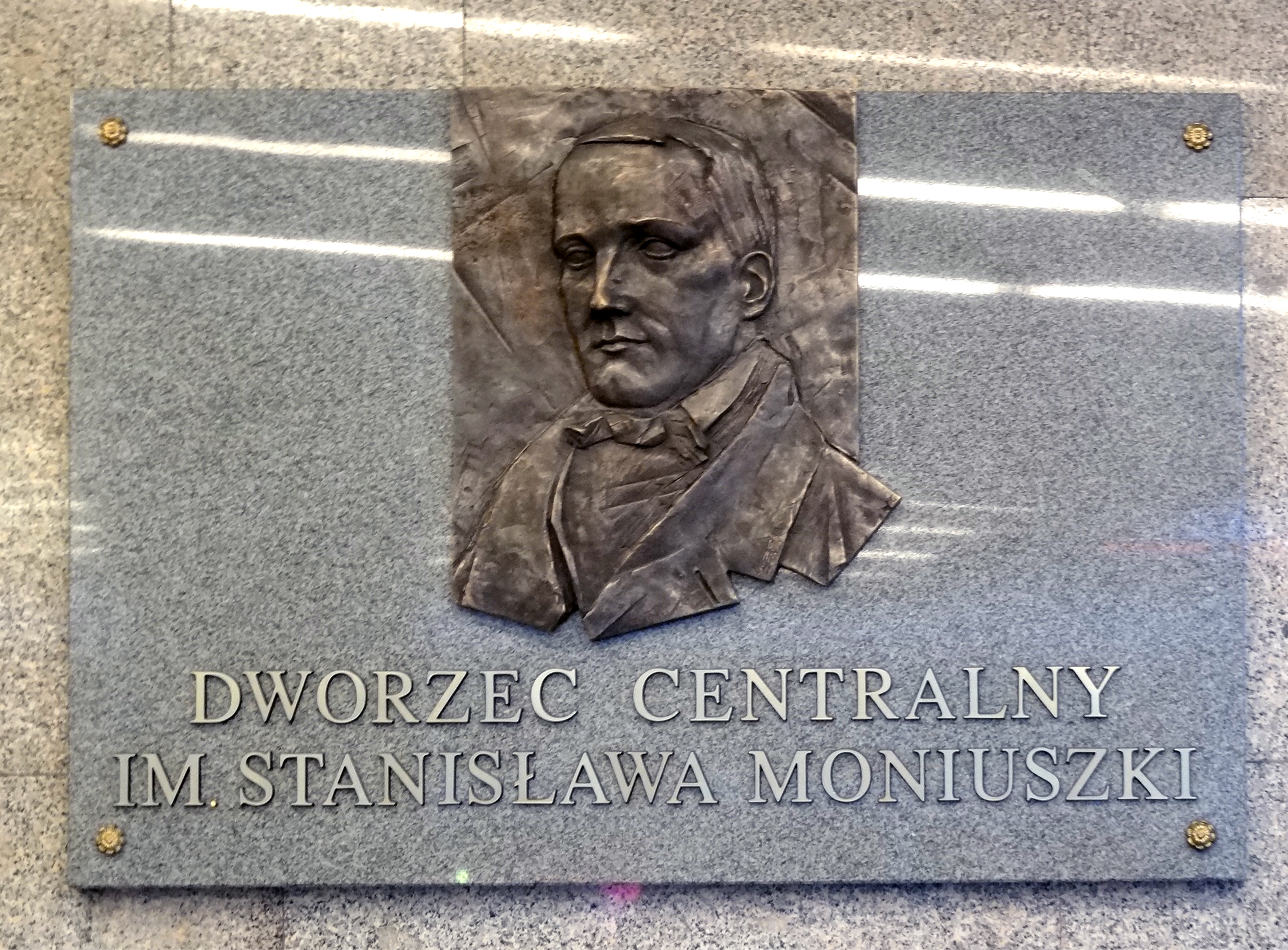
Granite plaque with the name of the station, Stanisław Moniuszko, attached after the renovation of 2010–12

In January 2019, the name of the Polish composer Stanisław Moniuszko was appended to Warszawa Centralna station, to celebrate the 200th anniversary of his birth.

== Location ==
Warsaw Central Station on map of the city's rail network

Warszawa Centralna is connected by an underground passage to two other rail stations: to the west lies Warszawa Śródmieście WKD railway station, the terminus of the WKD suburban light rail line, and to the east lies Warszawa Śródmieście PKP, served by suburban trains run by Masovian Railways and Rapid Urban Railway (Warsaw). From the station one can also easily access Złote Tarasy shopping centre, Centrum LIM, the Palace of Culture and Science and Varso Tower.

== International train services ==
Train number	Train name	Destination	Operated by
EN 9S/10S	Polonez (Suspended)	(Poland) Warszawa-Zachodnia (Russia) Moscow-Belorussky	(Poland) PKP Intercity (Russia) Russian Railways
EC 40/41 EC 44/45 EC 48/49	Berlin-Warszawa-Express	(Germany) Berlin Hbf (Poland) Warszawa-Wschodnia	(Germany) Deutsche Bahn (Poland) PKP Intercity
067/068	Kyiv Express	(Poland) Warszawa-Zachodnia (Ukraine) Kyiv-Pasazhyrskyi	(Ukraine) Ukrainian Railways
EC 102/103	Polonia	(Austria) Wien Hbf (Poland) Warszawa-Wschodnia	(Poland) PKP Intercity
EC 106/107	Sobieski	(Austria) Wien Hbf (Poland) Gdynia Główna	(Poland) PKP Intercity
IC 110/111	Silesia	(Czech Republic) Ostrava-Svinov (Poland) Warszawa-Wschodnia	(Poland) PKP Intercity
EC 112/113 EC 116/117	Silesia	(Czech Republic) Praha hl.n. (Poland) Warszawa-Wschodnia	(Czech Republic) České dráhy (Poland) PKP Intercity
IC 125/126	Mickiewicz (Services to Belarus suspended, Terminates in Terespol)	(Poland) Warszawa-Zachodnia (Belarus) Brest	(Poland) PKP Intercity
IC 127/128	Skaryna (Services to Belarus suspended, Terminates in Terespol)	(Poland) Warszawa-Zachodnia (Belarus) Brest	(Poland) PKP Intercity
EC 130/131	Báthory (Services to Belarus suspended, Terminates in Terespol)	(Hungary) Budapest-Nyugati (Belarus) Brest	(Hungary) Hungarian State Railways (Poland) PKP Intercity
IC 143/144	Hańcza	(Poland) Kraków-Główny (Lithuania) Mockava (coordination with a further train to (Lithuania) Vilnius)	(Poland) PKP Intercity
IC 145/146	Wigry	(Poland) Szczecin Główny (Lithuania) Mockava (coordination with a further train to (Lithuania) Vilnius)	(Poland) PKP Intercity
EC 246/247 IC 248/249	Berlin-Warszawa-Express	(Germany) Berlin Hbf (Poland) Warszawa-Wschodnia	(Germany) Deutsche Bahn (Poland) PKP Intercity
EN 404/405	Vltava (Suspended)	(Czech Republic) Praha hl.n. (Russia) Moscow-Belorussky	(Russia) Russian Railways
EN 406/407	Chopin (Service via Vienna)	(Germany) Munich hbf (Poland) Warszawa-Wschodnia	(Poland) PKP Intercity
EN 408/409	(Suspended)	(France) Nice-Ville (Russia) Moscow-Belorussky	(Poland) PKP Intercity (Russia) Russian Railways
IC 430/431	Ursa (Service via Łódź, most of the train runs to Świnoujście with some carriages joining a train to Berlin at Poznań Główny)	(Germany) Berlin Gesundbrunnen (Poland) Chełm	(Poland) PKP Intercity
EN 440/441	Strizh (Suspended)	(Germany) Berlin Hbf (Russia) Moscow-Belorussky	(Russia) Russian Railways
EN 452/453	(Suspended)	(France) Paris Est (Russia) Moscow-Belorussky	(Poland) PKP Intercity (Russia) Russian Railways
TLK 13102/13103	(Services to Belarus suspended)	(Poland) Kraków-Główny (Poland) Suwałki (cars: (Belarus) Grodno)	(Poland) PKP Intercity

== Domestic Train services ==
The station is served by the following service(s):

- Express Intercity Premium services (EIP) Gdynia – Warsaw
- Express Intercity Premium services (EIP) Warsaw – Wrocław
- Express Intercity Premium services (EIP) Warsaw – Katowice – Bielsko-Biała
- Express Intercity Premium services (EIP) Gdynia – Warsaw – Katowice – Gliwice/Bielsko-Biała
- Express Intercity Premium services (EIP) Warsaw – Kraków
- Express Intercity Premium services (EIP) Gdynia/Kołobrzeg – Warsaw – Kraków (- Rzeszów)
- Express Intercity services (EIC) Szczecin — Warsaw
- Express Intercity services (EIC) Warsaw – Wrocław
- Express Intercity services (EIC) Warsaw – Kraków – Zakopane
- Intercity services (IC) Wrocław- Opole – Częstochowa – Warszawa
- Intercity services (IC) Wrocław – Ostrów Wielkopolski – Łódź – Warszawa
- Intercity services (IC) Białystok – Warszawa – Częstochowa – Opole – Wrocław
- Intercity services (IC) Białystok – Warszawa – Łódź – Ostrów Wielkopolski – Wrocław
- Intercity services (IC) Ełk – Białystok – Warszawa – Łódź – Ostrów Wielkopolski – Wrocław
- Intercity services (IC) Olsztyn – Warszawa – Skierniewice – Częstochowa – Katowice – Gliwice – Racibórz
- Intercity services (IC) Olsztyn – Warszawa – Skierniewice – Łódź
- Intercity services (IC) Olsztyn – Warszawa – Skierniewice – Częstochowa – Katowice – Bielsko-Biała
- Intercity services (IC) Olsztyn – Warszawa – Skierniewice – Częstochowa – Katowice – Gliwice – Racibórz
- Intercity services (TLK) Warszawa – Częstochowa – Lubliniec – Opole – Wrocław – Szklarska Poręba Górna
- Intercity services (TLK) Warszawa – Częstochowa – Katowice – Opole – Wrocław – Szklarska Poręba Górna
- Intercity services (TLK) Gdynia Główna – Zakopane
- Regional services (ŁKA) Łódz – Warsaw

Preceding station	PKP Intercity	Following station
Warszawa Zachodnia towards Berlin Hbf	EuroCity EC 95; EIC	Warszawa Wschodnia Terminus
Warszawa Zachodnia Terminus	Kyiv-Express	Warszawa Wschodnia towards Kyiv-Pasazhyrskyi
Warszawa Wschodnia towards Gdynia Główna	EIP	Terminus
Warszawa Wschodnia Terminus	EIP	Warszawa Zachodnia towards Wrocław Główny
Warszawa Wschodnia Terminus	EIP	Warszawa Zachodnia towards Bielsko-Biała Główna
Warszawa Wschodnia towards Gdynia Główna	EIP	Warszawa Zachodnia towards Gliwice or Bielsko-Biała Główna
Warszawa Wschodnia Terminus	EIP	Warszawa Zachodnia towards Kraków Główny
Warszawa Wschodnia towards Gdynia Główna or Kołobrzeg	EIP	Warszawa Zachodnia towards Kraków Główny or Rzeszów Główny
Warszawa Zachodnia towards Szczecin Główny	EIC	Warszawa Wschodnia Terminus
Warszawa Wschodnia Terminus	EIC	Warszawa Zachodnia towards Wrocław Główny
Warszawa Wschodnia Terminus	EIC	Warszawa Zachodnia towards Zakopane
Warszawa Wschodnia towards Białystok or Ełk	IC	Warszawa Zachodnia towards Wrocław Główny
Warszawa Wschodnia towards Białystok	IC	Warszawa Zachodnia towards Bielsko-Biała Główna
Warszawa Wschodnia Terminus	IC	Warszawa Zachodnia towards Wrocław Główny
Warszawa Zachodnia towards Łódź Fabryczna	IC	Warszawa Wschodnia towards Olsztyn Główny
Warszawa Zachodnia towards Bielsko-Biała Główna or Racibórz	IC	Warszawa Wschodnia towards Olsztyn Główny
Warszawa Zachodnia towards Szklarska Poręba Górna	TLK	Warszawa Wschodnia Terminus
Warszawa Wschodnia towards Gdynia Główna	TLK	Warszawa Zachodnia towards Zakopane
Preceding station	Masovian Railways	Following station
Warszawa Zachodnia towards Skierniewice	RE1	Warszawa Wschodnia towards Warszawa Wschodnia or Warszawa Główna
Warszawa Zachodnia Terminus	RE9	Warszawa Wschodnia towards Działdowo
Warszawa Zachodnia towards Warsaw Chopin Airport	RL	Warszawa Wschodnia towards Modlin
Preceding station	ŁKA	Following station
Warszawa Zachodnia towards Łódź Fabryczna	Łódź - Warsaw	Warszawa Wschodnia Terminus
Preceding station	SKM Warsaw	Following station
Warszawa Zachodnia towards Pruszków	S1	Warszawa Wschodnia towards Otwock

== See also ==
- Rail transport in Poland
- List of busiest railway stations in Poland
