= Jurydyka =

Jurydyki of Warsaw in the 18th century, owned privately

Jurydyka (plural: jurydyki, improperly: jurydykas), is a legal entity in the Polish legal system from bygone centuries (originating from Latin: iurisdictio, jurisdiction), denoting a privately owned tract of land within a larger municipality, often right outside the royal city, or as an autonomous enclave within it. Jurydyki claimed exemption from the town's jurisdiction, and exerted municipal rights separate from the local laws, usually for their owners' financial benefit.

== History ==
Jurydyki were popular already in the Polish–Lithuanian Commonwealth of the 16 century, ruled by the ecclesiastic and secular lords and seigneurs eager to break up the legal unity of the town to accommodate favoured colonies of craftsmen not subjected to guild regulations. The Jurydyki were often perceived as a menace withholding municipal taxes and services under the jurisdiction (hence the name) of powerful and wealthy townsmen who founded and owned them. Formed as a separate unit of territorial division between 14th and 16th centuries, the jurydyka-type settlements were a way in which the Roman Catholic Church and the Polish nobility avoided the terms of the royal town charters. Most notably, the Jurydyki were exempted from the specific trade laws allowing only selected merchants and craftsmen to take part in the markets held in the cities. In many Polish cities the Jurydyki were eventually incorporated into the towns as their boroughs. This was the case of Warsaw, which in early 18th century was surrounded by no less than 14 such entities, some of them with as many as 5,000 inhabitants. All of them are now neighbourhoods of Warsaw.
