= Czeruchy railway station =

Railway station in Pniewo-Czeruchy, Poland

Czeruchy

General information
- Location: Pniewo-Czeruchy, Regimin, Ciechanów, Masovian; Poland
- Coordinates: 52.9364596°N 20.5056973°E
- System: Rail Station
- Owner: Polskie Koleje Państwowe S.A.

Services
Preceding station	Masovian Railways	Following station
Ciechanów towards Warszawa Zachodnia	R9	Krośnice Mazowieckie towards Działdowo
Ciechanów towards Warszawa Zachodnia	R90	Krośnice Mazowieckie towards Działdowo
Ciechanów towards Warszawa Zachodnia	RE9	Krośnice Mazowieckie towards Działdowo
Ciechanów towards Warszawa Zachodnia	RE90	Krośnice Mazowieckie towards Działdowo
Location

Czeruchy railway station is a railway station at Pniewo-Czeruchy, Ciechanów, Masovian, Poland. It is served by Masovian Railways.
