= Jaktorów railway station =

Railway station in Jaktorów, Poland

Jaktorów
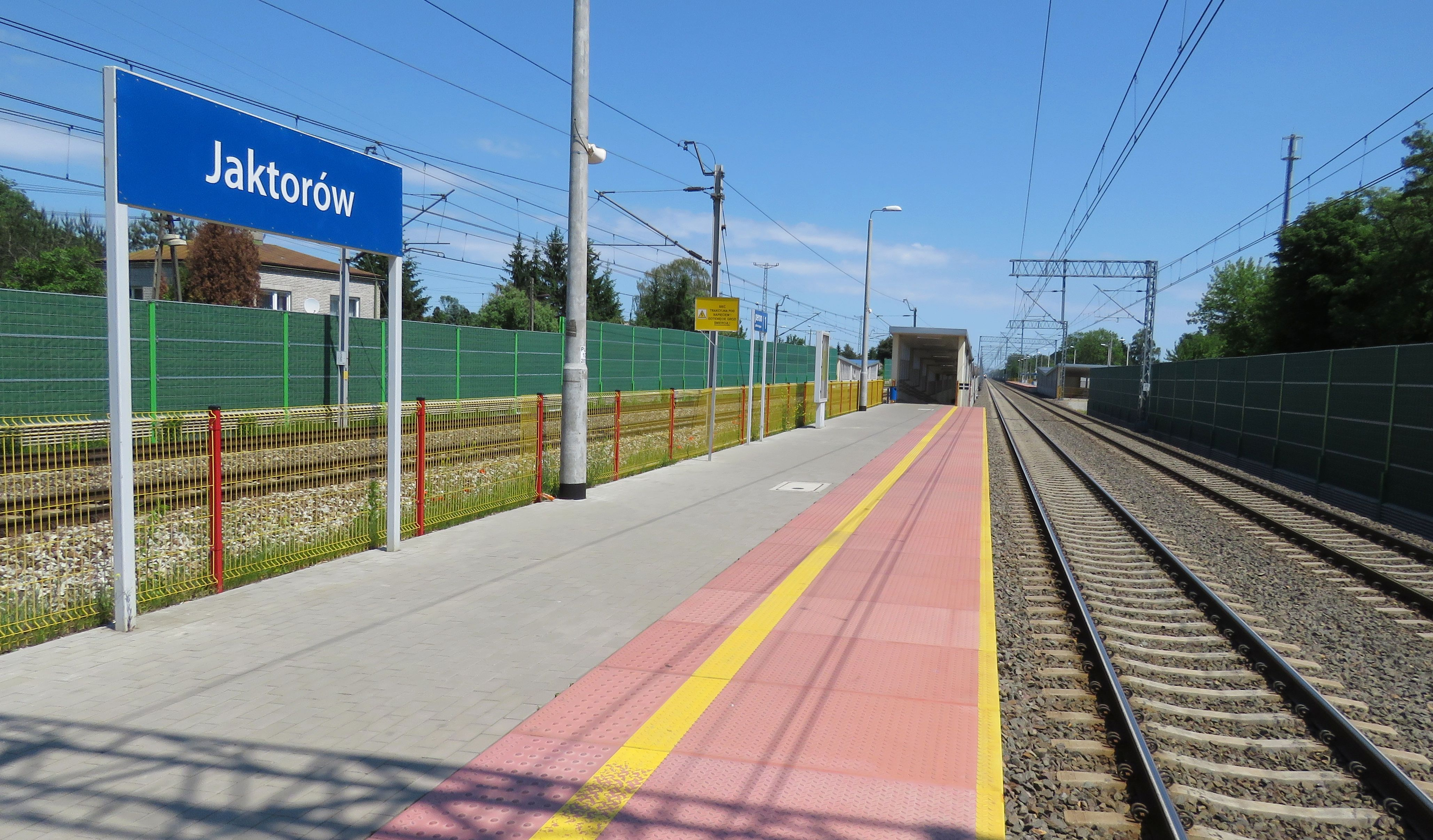

General information
- Location: Jaktorów, Jaktorów, Grodzisk, Masovian; Poland
- Coordinates: 52.08666°N 20.55094°E
- System: Rail Station
- Owner: PKP Polskie Linie Kolejowe
- Operator: PKP Polskie Linie Kolejowe

Services
Preceding station	Masovian Railways	Following station
Międzyborów towards Skierniewice	R1	Grodzisk Mazowiecki towards Warszawa Wschodnia or Warszawa Główna
Międzyborów towards Skierniewice	RE1	Warszawa Zachodnia towards Warszawa Wschodnia or Warszawa Główna
Location

Jaktorów railway station is a railway station in Jaktorów, Grodzisk County, Masovian Voivodeship, Poland. It is served by Masovian Railways.
