= Konopki railway station =

Railway station in Masovian Voivodeship, Poland

Konopki

General information
- Location: Konopki, Stupsk, Mława, Masovian; Poland
- Coordinates: 52.9967996°N 20.4598852°E
- System: Rail Station
- Owner: Polskie Koleje Państwowe S.A.

Services
Preceding station	Masovian Railways	Following station
Krośnice Mazowieckie towards Warszawa Zachodnia	R9	Stupsk Mazowiecki towards Działdowo
Krośnice Mazowieckie towards Warszawa Zachodnia	R90	Stupsk Mazowiecki towards Działdowo
Krośnice Mazowieckie towards Warszawa Zachodnia	RE9	Stupsk Mazowiecki towards Działdowo
Krośnice Mazowieckie towards Warszawa Zachodnia	RE90	Stupsk Mazowiecki towards Działdowo
Location

Konopki railway station is a railway station at Konopki, Mława, Masovian, Poland. It is served by Masovian Railways.
