= Brwinów railway station =

Railway station in Brwinów, Poland

Brwinów
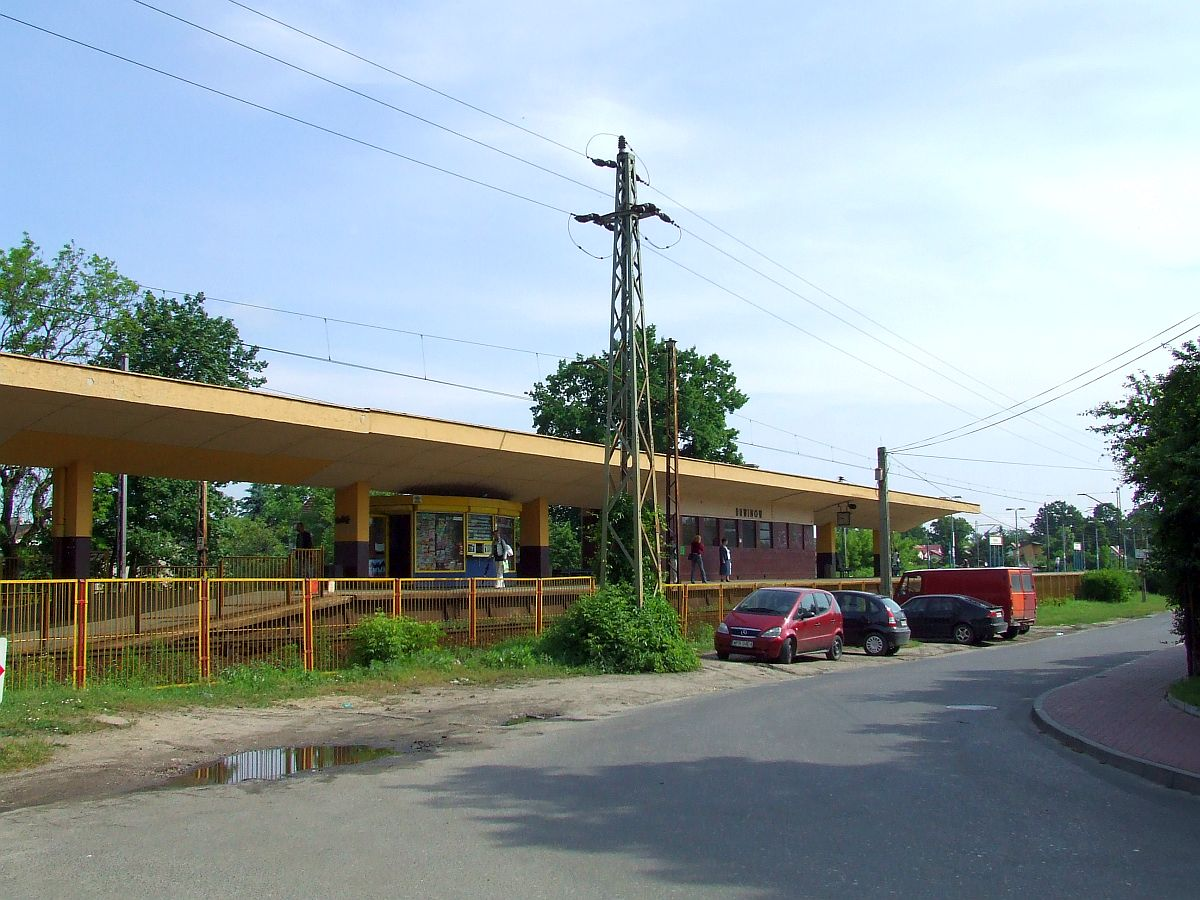

General information
- Location: Brwinów, Masovian; Poland
- Coordinates: 52°08′31″N 20°43′04″E
- Owner: Polish State Railways
- Platforms: 1
- Tracks: 2

History
- Opened: 1848

Services
| Preceding station | Masovian Railways | Following station |
|---|---|---|
| Milanówek towards Skierniewice | R1 | Parzniew towards Warszawa Wschodnia or Warszawa Główna |
Location

Brwinów is a railway station in Brwinów, Poland. The station is served by Masovian Railways, who run trains from Skierniewice to Warszawa Wschodnia.
