= Milanówek railway station =

Railway station in Milanówek, Poland

Milanówek
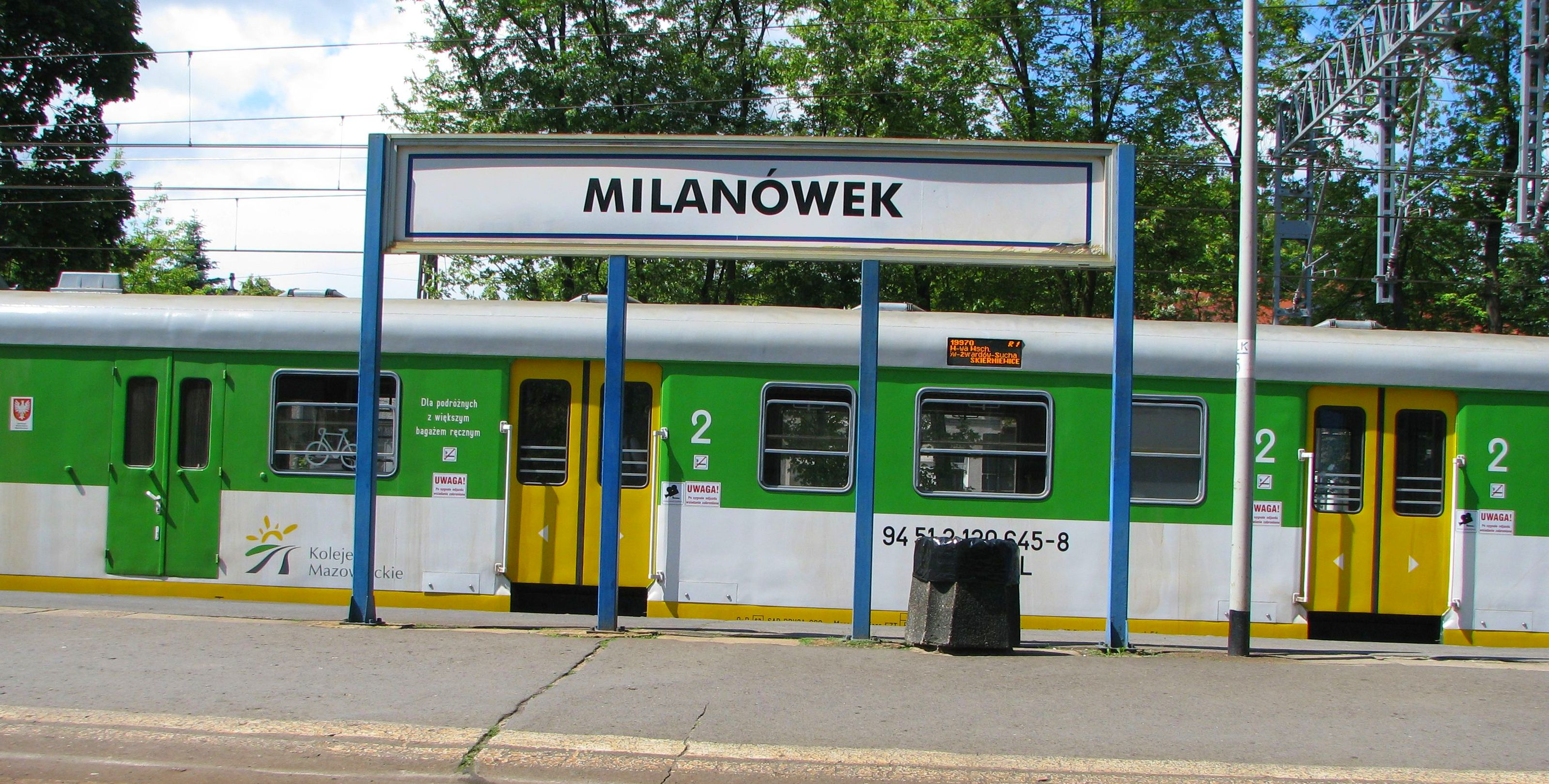

General information
- Location: Milanówek, Masovian; Poland
- Coordinates: 52°07′29″N 20°40′02″E
- Owner: Polskie Koleje Państwowe S.A.
- Platforms: 1
- Tracks: 2

History
- Opened: 1906

Services
Preceding station	Masovian Railways	Following station
Grodzisk Mazowiecki towards Skierniewice	R1	Brwinów towards Warszawa Wschodnia or Warszawa Główna
Location

Milanówek railway station is a railway station in Milanówek, Poland. The station is served by Masovian Railways, who run trains from Skierniewice to Warszawa Wschodnia.
