= Krośnice Mazowieckie railway station =

Railway station in Masovian Voivodeship, Poland

Krośnice Mazowieckie

General information
- Location: Krośnice, Stupsk, Mława, Masovian; Poland
- Coordinates: 52.9683492°N 20.4921468°E
- System: Rail Station
- Owner: Polskie Koleje Państwowe S.A.

Services
Preceding station	Masovian Railways	Following station
Czeruchy towards Warszawa Zachodnia	R9	Konopki towards Działdowo
Czeruchy towards Warszawa Zachodnia	R90	Konopki towards Działdowo
Czeruchy towards Warszawa Zachodnia	RE9	Konopki towards Działdowo
Czeruchy towards Warszawa Zachodnia	RE90	Konopki towards Działdowo
Location

Krośnice Mazowieckie railway station is a railway station at Krośnice, Mława, Masovian, Poland. It is served by Masovian Railways.
