= Międzyborów railway station =

Railway station in Międzyborów, Poland

Międzyborów
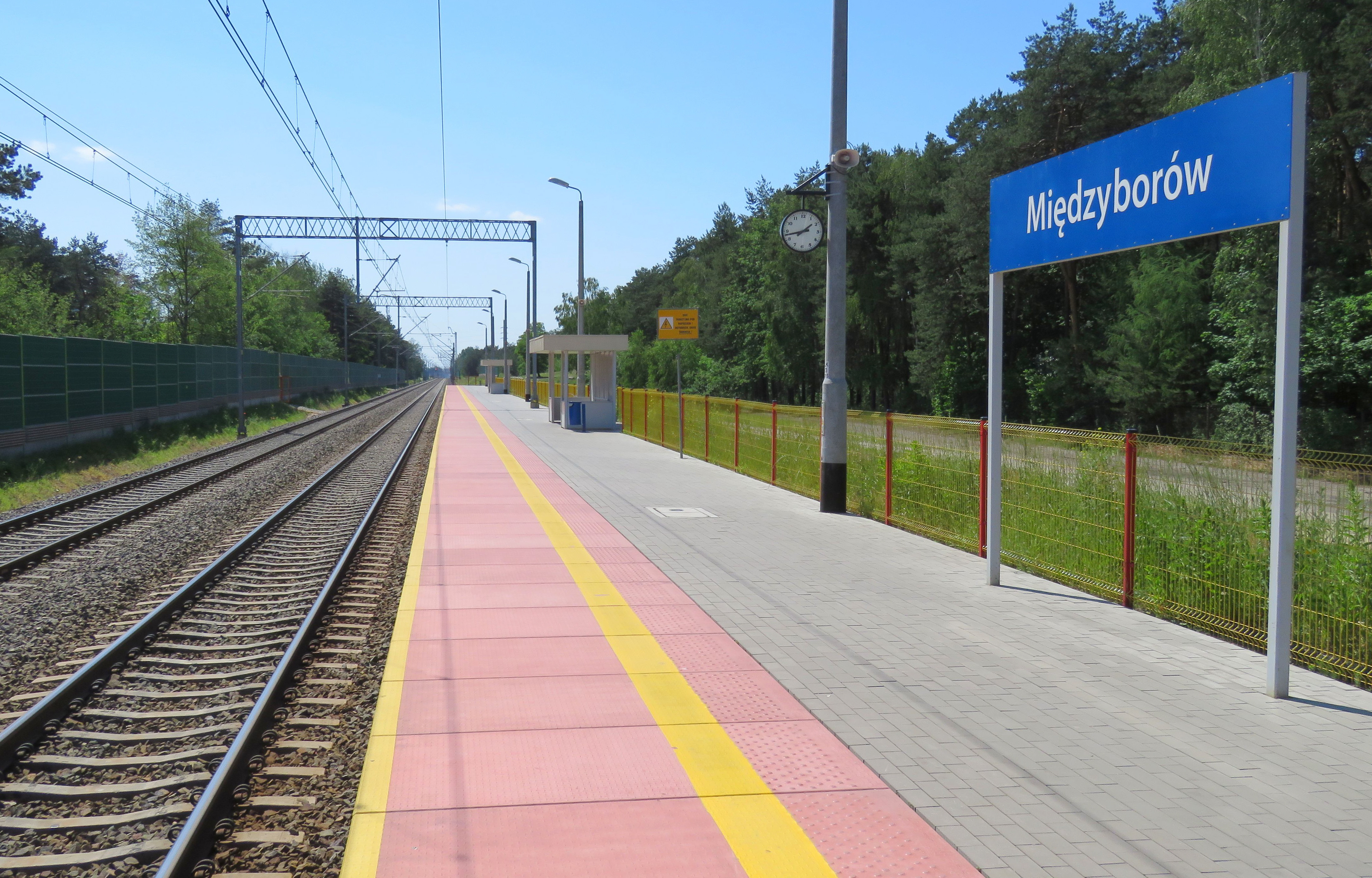

General information
- Location: Międzyborów, Jaktorów, Grodzisk, Masovian; Poland
- Coordinates: 52.8480795°N 19.6532546°E
- System: Rail Station
- Owner: Polskie Koleje Państwowe S.A.

Services
Preceding station	Masovian Railways	Following station
Żyrardów towards Skierniewice	R1	Jaktorów towards Warszawa Wschodnia or Warszawa Główna
Żyrardów towards Skierniewice	RE1	Jaktorów towards Warszawa Wschodnia or Warszawa Główna
Location

Międzyborów railway station is a railway station in Międzyborów, Grodzisk County, Masovian Voivodeship, Poland. It is served by Masovian Railways.
