= Parzniew railway station =

Railway station in Poland

Parzniew
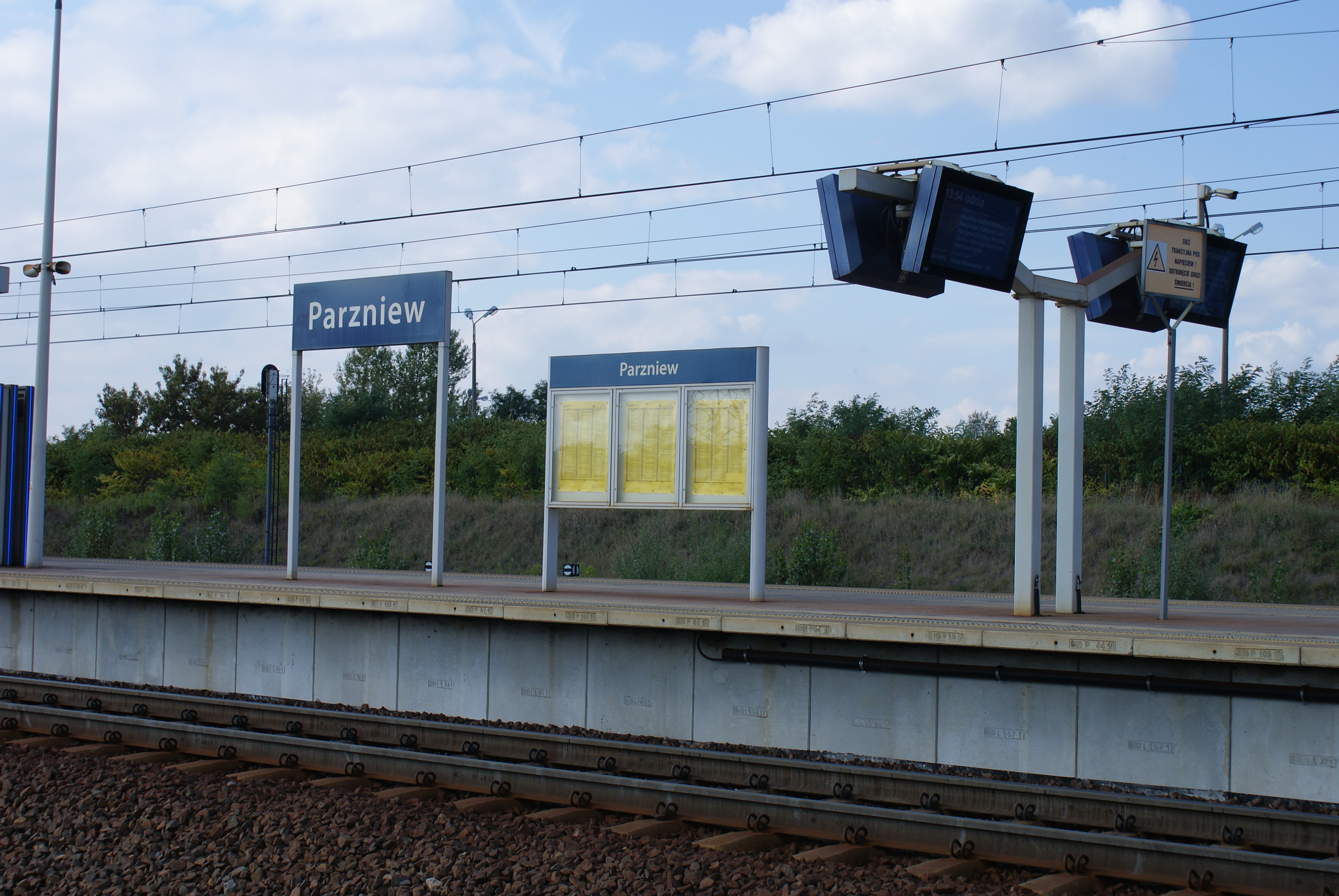

General information
- Location: Parzniew, Masovian; Poland
- Coordinates: 52°09′23″N 20°45′47″E
- Owner: Polskie Koleje Państwowe S.A.
- Platforms: 1
- Tracks: 2

History
- Opened: 2018

Services
Preceding station	Masovian Railways	Following station
Brwinów towards Skierniewice	R1	Pruszków towards Warszawa Wschodnia or Warszawa Główna
Location

Parzniew railway station is a railway station in Parzniew, Poland. The station is served by Masovian Railways, who run trains from Skierniewice to Warszawa Wschodnia.
