= Wyszyny railway station =

Railway station in Wyszyny Kościelne, Poland

Wyszyny

General information
- Location: Wyszyny Kościelne, Stupsk, Mława, Masovian; Poland
- Coordinates: 53.0608515°N 20.3933986°E
- System: Rail Station
- Owner: Polskie Koleje Państwowe S.A.

Services
Preceding station	Masovian Railways	Following station
Stupsk Mazowiecki towards Warszawa Zachodnia	R9	Mława Miasto towards Działdowo
Stupsk Mazowiecki towards Warszawa Zachodnia	R90	Mława Miasto towards Działdowo
Stupsk Mazowiecki towards Warszawa Zachodnia	RE9	Mława Miasto towards Działdowo
Stupsk Mazowiecki towards Warszawa Zachodnia	RE90	Mława Miasto towards Działdowo
Location

Wyszyny railway station is a railway station at Wyszyny Kościelne, Mława, Masovian, Poland. It is served by Masovian Railways.
