= Stupsk Mazowiecki railway station =

Railway station in Stupsk, Poland

Stupsk Mazowiecki

General information
- Location: Stupsk, Mława, Masovian; Poland
- Coordinates: 53.0209397°N 20.4360886°E
- System: Rail Station
- Owner: Polskie Koleje Państwowe S.A.

Services
Preceding station	Masovian Railways	Following station
Konopki towards Warszawa Zachodnia	R9	Wyszyny towards Działdowo
Konopki towards Warszawa Zachodnia	R90	Wyszyny towards Działdowo
Konopki towards Warszawa Zachodnia	RE9	Wyszyny towards Działdowo
Konopki towards Warszawa Zachodnia	RE90	Wyszyny towards Działdowo
Location

Stupsk Mazowiecki railway station is a railway station at Stupsk, Mława, Masovian, Poland. It is served by Masovian Railways.
