= Mława Miasto railway station =

Railway station in Mława, Poland

Mława Miasto

General information
- Location: Mława, Mława, Masovian; Poland
- Coordinates: 53.1090032°N 20.3646078°E
- System: Rail Station
- Owner: Polskie Koleje Państwowe S.A.

Services
Preceding station	Masovian Railways	Following station
Wyszyny towards Warszawa Zachodnia	R9	Mława towards Działdowo
Wyszyny towards Warszawa Zachodnia	R90	Mława towards Działdowo
Wyszyny towards Warszawa Zachodnia	RE9	Mława towards Działdowo
Wyszyny towards Warszawa Zachodnia	RE90	Mława towards Działdowo
Location

Mława Miasto railway station is a railway station at Mława, Mława County, Masovian, Poland. It is served by Masovian Railways, it has the category of a local station, There are 2 platforms here.

After the modization of the line, the platforms were moved closer to the Osiedle Książąt Mazowiecki.

The station was built between 1985 and 1986.

As part of the project "Government program for the construction or modernization of railway station for 2021-2025", the stop modernized in 2023.
