= Grodzisk Mazowiecki railway station =

Railway station in Grodzisk Mazowiecki, Poland

Grodzisk Mazowiecki
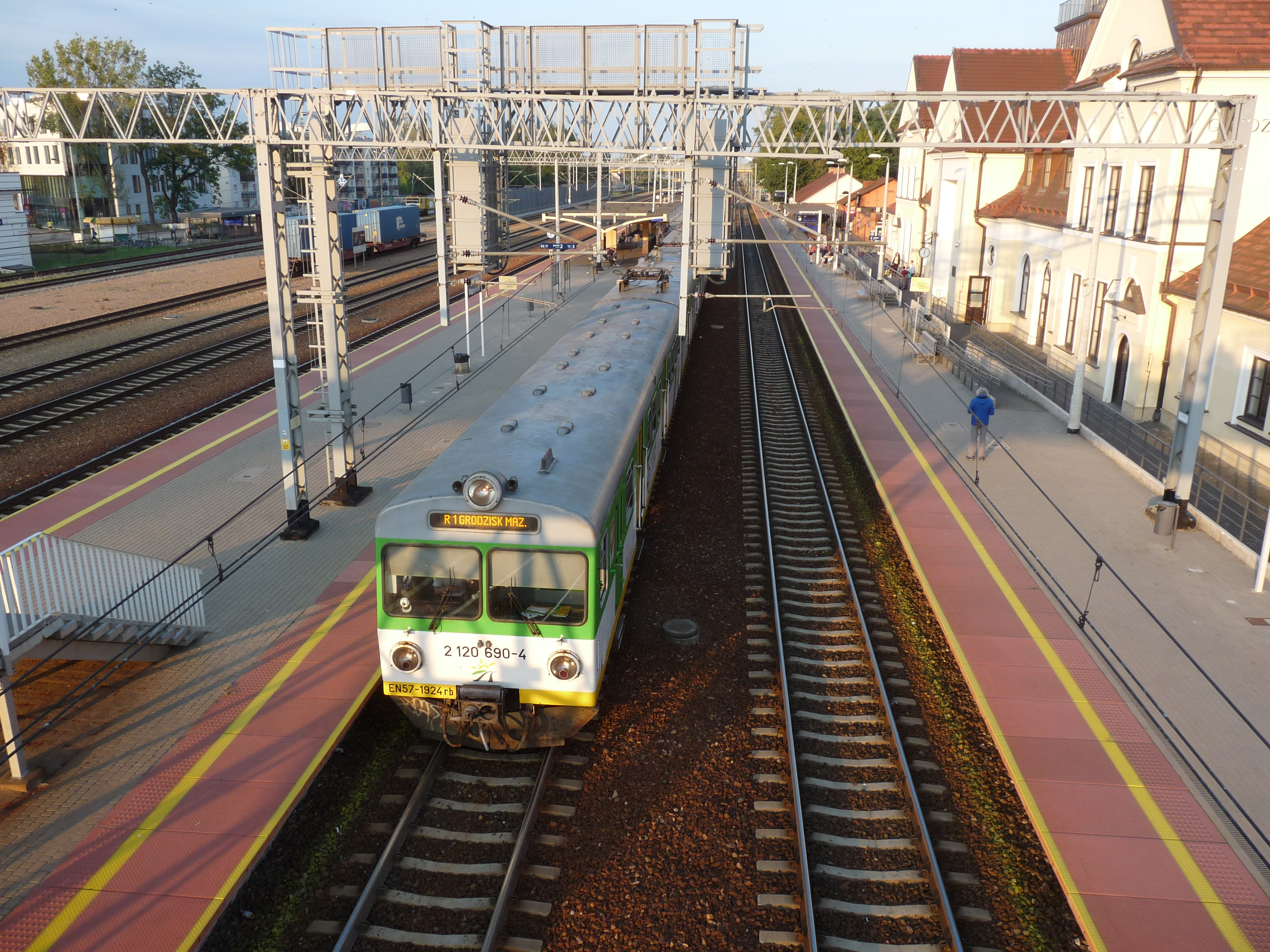

General information
- Location: Grodzisk Mazowiecki, Masovian; Poland
- Coordinates: 52°06′35″N 20°37′18″E
- System: B
- Owner: Polskie Koleje Państwowe S.A.
- Platforms: 2
- Tracks: 3

Construction
- Structure type: Building: Yes

History
- Opened: 1845

Services
Preceding station	PKP Intercity	Following station
Częstochowa towards Szklarska Poręba Górna	TLK via Lubliniec	Warszawa Gdańska towards Warszawa Wschodnia
Częstochowa towards Szklarska Poręba Górna	TLK via Lubliniec	Warszawa Zachodnia towards Warszawa Wschodnia
Warszawa Zachodnia towards Gdynia Główna	TLK	Żyrardów towards Zakopane
Preceding station	Polregio	Following station
Żyrardów towards Łódź Fabryczna	IR	Warszawa Zachodnia towards Warszawa Główna
Żyrardów towards Łódź Kaliska, Ostrów Wielkopolski or Poznań Główny	IR	Warszawa Zachodnia towards Warszawa Główna
Preceding station	Masovian Railways	Following station
Jaktorów towards Skierniewice	R1	Milanówek towards Warszawa Wschodnia or Warszawa Główna
Location
- Location within Masovian Voivodeship Location within Poland Location within Europe

Grodzisk Mazowiecki railway station is a railway station serving Grodzisk Mazowiecki in Grodzisk County, Poland. It is classed as Category B on the classification of Polish railway stations and is served exclusively by Masovian Railways, which runs services from Skierniewice to Warszawa Wschodnia.

It was built as part of the first stage of the Warsaw–Vienna railway: the 30 km (19 mi) stretch from Warsaw to Grodzisk Mazowiecki opened on 14 June 1845. The station became a through station on 15 October 1845 when the line to Skierniewice was opened.

== Train services ==
The station is served by the following service(s):

- Intercity services (TLK) Warszawa - Częstochowa - Katowice - Opole - Wrocław - Szklarska Poręba Górna
- Intercity services (TLK) Gdynia Główna — Zakopane
- InterRegio services (IR) Łódź Fabryczna — Warszawa Glowna
- InterRegio services (IR) Łódź Kaliska — Warszawa Glowna
- InterRegio services (IR) Ostrów Wielkopolski — Łódź — Warszawa Główna
- InterRegio services (IR) Poznań Główny — Ostrów Wielkopolski — Łódź — Warszawa Główna
