= Skierniewice Rawka railway station =

Railway station in Skierniewice, Poland

Skierniewice Rawka

General information
- Location: Skierniewice, Łódź; Poland
- Coordinates: 52.8480795°N 19.6532546°E
- System: Rail Station
- Owner: Polskie Koleje Państwowe S.A.

Services
Preceding station	Polregio	Following station
Skierniewice towards Łódź Fabryczna	IR	Żyrardów towards Warszawa Główna
Skierniewice towards Łódź Kaliska, Ostrów Wielkopolski or Poznań Główny	IR	Żyrardów towards Warszawa Główna
Preceding station	Masovian Railways	Following station
Skierniewice Terminus	R1	Radziwiłłów Mazowiecki towards Warszawa Wschodnia or Warszawa Główna
Skierniewice Terminus	RE1	Radziwiłłów Mazowiecki towards Warszawa Wschodnia or Warszawa Główna
Location

Skierniewice Rawka railway station is a railway station in Skierniewice, Łódź, Poland. It is served by Masovian Railways.

== Train services ==
The station is served by the following service(s):

- InterRegio services (IR) Łódź Fabryczna — Warszawa Glowna
- InterRegio services (IR) Łódź Kaliska — Warszawa Glowna
- InterRegio services (IR) Ostrów Wielkopolski — Łódź — Warszawa Główna
- InterRegio services (IR) Poznań Główny — Ostrów Wielkopolski — Łódź — Warszawa Główna
