= Żyrardów railway station =

Railway station in Żyrardów, Poland

Żyrardów
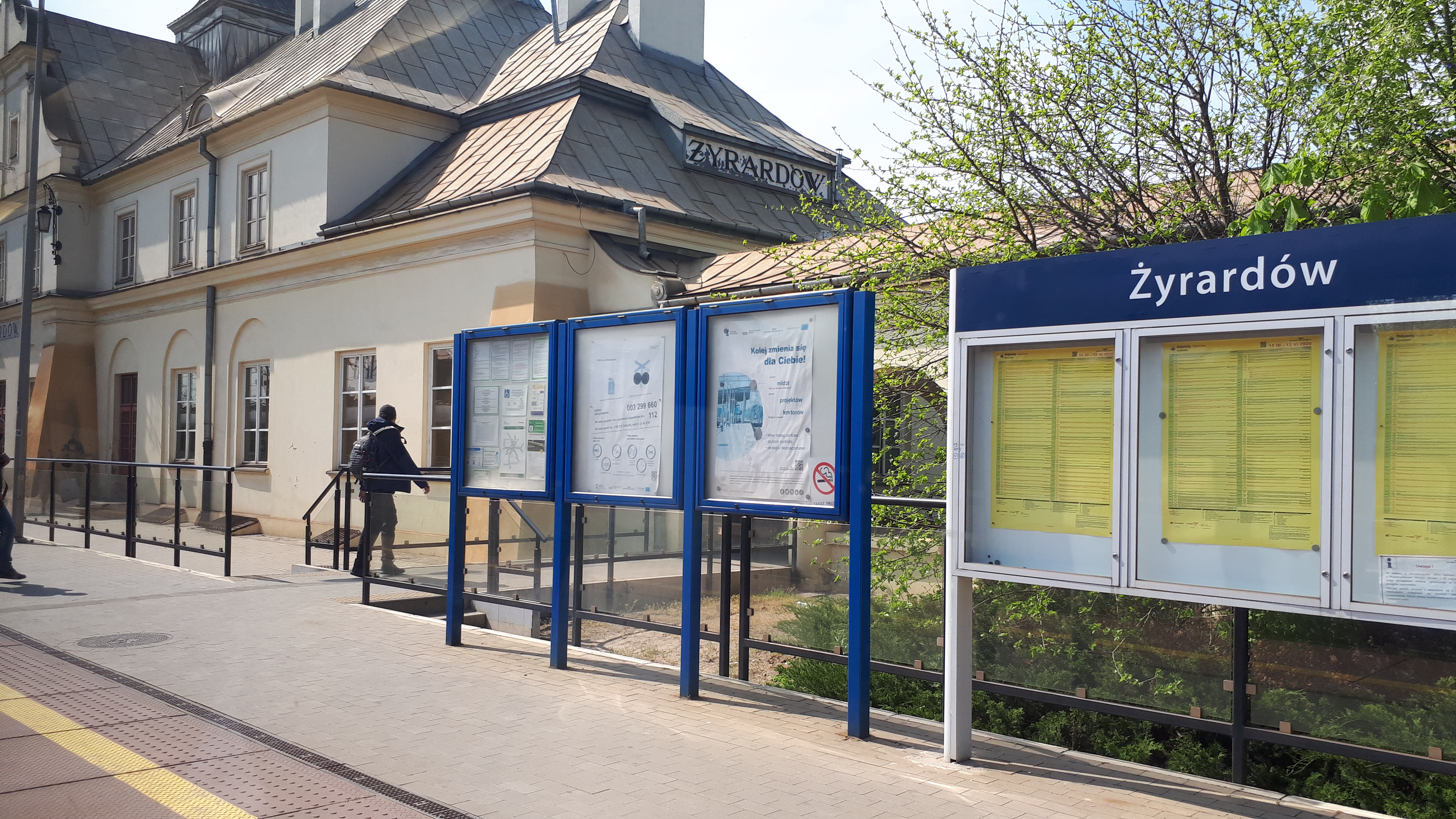

General information
- Location: Żyrardów, Masovian; Poland
- Coordinates: 52°3′9″N 20°26′55″E
- Owner: Polskie Koleje Państwowe S.A.
- Platforms: 2
- Tracks: 3

History
- Opened: 1845
Location
- Location within Masovian Voivodeship Location within Poland Location within Europe

Żyrardów railway station is a railway station in Żyrardów, Poland. The station is served by Masovian Railways (who run trains from Skierniewice to Warszawa Wschodnia), PKP Intercity (TLK and IC services), and Polregio (InterRegio services). It was opened in 1845 as part of the Warsaw–Vienna railway.

== Train services ==
The station is served by the following service(s):

- Intercity services (IC) Łódź Fabryczna — Warszawa Główna/Warszawa Wschodnia
- Intercity services (IC) Łódź Fabryczna — Warszawa — Lublin Główny
- Intercity services (IC) Łódź Fabryczna — Warszawa — Gdańsk Glowny — Kołobrzeg
- Intercity services (IC) Bydgoszcz Główna — Warszawa Główna
- Intercity services (IC) Wrocław- Opole - Częstochowa - Warszawa
- Intercity services (IC) Wrocław - Ostrów Wielkopolski - Łódź - Warszawa
- Intercity services (IC) Zgorzelec - Legnica - Wrocław - Ostrów Wielkopolski - Łódź - Warszawa
- Intercity services (IC) Białystok - Warszawa - Częstochowa - Opole - Wrocław
- Intercity services (IC) Białystok - Warszawa - Łódź - Ostrów Wielkopolski - Wrocław
- Intercity services (IC) Ełk - Białystok - Warszawa - Łódź - Ostrów Wielkopolski - Wrocław
- Intercity services (IC) Warszawa - Częstochowa - Katowice - Bielsko-Biała
- Intercity services (IC) Białystok - Warszawa - Częstochowa - Katowice - Bielsko-Biała
- Intercity services (IC) Kołobrzeg - Piła - Bydgoszcz - Warszawa - Lublin - Hrubieszów
- Intercity services (IC) Olsztyn - Warszawa - Skierniewice - Łódź
- Intercity services (IC) Olsztyn - Warszawa - Skierniewice - Częstochowa - Katowice - Bielsko-Biała
- Intercity services (IC) Olsztyn - Warszawa - Skierniewice - Częstochowa - Katowice - Gliwice - Racibórz
- Intercity services (TLK) Warszawa - Częstochowa - Lubliniec - Opole - Wrocław - Szklarska Poręba Górna
- Intercity services (TLK) Gdynia Główna — Zakopane
- InterRegio services (IR) Łódź Fabryczna — Warszawa Glowna
- InterRegio services (IR) Łódź Kaliska — Warszawa Glowna
- InterRegio services (IR) Ostrów Wielkopolski — Łódź — Warszawa Główna
- InterRegio services (IR) Poznań Główny — Ostrów Wielkopolski — Łódź — Warszawa Główna

Preceding station	PKP Intercity	Following station
Skierniewice towards Łódź Fabryczna	IC	Warszawa Zachodnia towards Warszawa Główna
Skierniewice towards Łódź Fabryczna	IC	Warszawa Gdańska towards Warszawa Wschodnia
Skierniewice towards Łódź Fabryczna	IC	Warszawa Gdańska towards Lublin Główny
Skierniewice towards Łódź Fabryczna	IC	Warszawa Gdańska towards Kołobrzeg
Warszawa Zachodnia towards Warszawa Główna	IC	Skierniewice towards Bydgoszcz Główna
Warszawa Zachodnia towards Warszawa Wschodnia	IC Via Warszawa Zachodnia	Skierniewice towards Wrocław Główny
Warszawa Gdańska towards Warszawa Gdańska or Warszawa Wschodnia	IC Via Warszawa Gdańska	Skierniewice towards Wrocław Główny
Warszawa Zachodnia towards Białystok or Ełk	IC	Skierniewice towards Wrocław Główny
Warszawa Gdańska towards Warszawa Wschodnia	IC	Skierniewice towards Bielsko-Biała Główna
Warszawa Zachodnia towards Białystok	IC	Skierniewice towards Bielsko-Biała Główna
Warszawa Gdańska towards Warszawa Wschodnia	IC	Skierniewice towards Zgorzelec
Skierniewice towards Kołobrzeg	IC	Warszawa Gdańska towards Hrubieszów Miasto
Skierniewice towards Łódź Fabryczna	IC	Warszawa Zachodnia towards Olsztyn Główny
Skierniewice towards Bielsko-Biała Główna or Racibórz	IC	Warszawa Zachodnia towards Olsztyn Główny
Skierniewice towards Szklarska Poręba Górna	TLK via Lubliniec	Warszawa Gdańska towards Warszawa Wschodnia
Skierniewice towards Szklarska Poręba Górna	TLK via Lubliniec	Warszawa Zachodnia towards Warszawa Wschodnia
Grodzisk Mazowiecki towards Gdynia Główna	TLK	Skierniewice towards Zakopane
Preceding station	Polregio	Following station
Skierniewice Rawka towards Łódź Fabryczna	IR	Grodzisk Mazowiecki towards Warszawa Główna
Skierniewice Rawka towards Łódź Kaliska, Ostrów Wielkopolski or Poznań Główny	IR	Grodzisk Mazowiecki towards Warszawa Główna
Preceding station	Masovian Railways	Following station
Sucha Żyrardowska towards Skierniewice	R1	Międzyborów towards Warszawa Wschodnia or Warszawa Główna
Sucha Żyrardowska towards Skierniewice	RE1	Międzyborów towards Warszawa Wschodnia or Warszawa Główna
