= Żenczykowski =

Żenczykowski, feminine: Żenczykowska is a Polish surname. Notable people with the surname Żenczykowski or Zenczykowski include:

- Tadeusz Żenczykowski (1907–1997), Polish lawyer, political activist and soldier in the Home Army during World War II
- Wacław Żenczykowski (1897–1957), Polish structural engineer, professor
