= Konopki, Masovian Voivodeship =

Konopki
- Village
- Location within Poland
- Coordinates: 52°59′38″N 20°27′34″E
- Country: Poland
- Voivodeship: Masovian
- County: Mława
- Gmina: Stupsk

Konopki [kɔˈnɔpki] is a village in the administrative district of Gmina Stupsk, within Mława County, Masovian Voivodeship, in east-central Poland. Konopki is home to various local community organizations and events. The village coordinates community efforts to maintain cultural traditions, such as the Jarmark Szlachecki, a fair that highlights Polish heritage through performances, historical reenactments, and artisanal crafts. The village’s postal code is 06-560, and it is part of a larger network of rural communities within the Gmina Stupsk region.
