= Wacław Żenczykowski =

Polish structural engineer (1897–1957)

Wacław Żenczykowski (26 November 1897 in Kielce – 18 February 1957 in Zürich), was a Polish structural engineer. He was a member of Polish Academy of Sciences and a professor at Warsaw University of Technology. During 1925 to 1939, he designed over 40 projects involving large buildings, including Patria Hotel in Krynica, the edifice of Dyrekcja PKP on Targowa Street in Warsaw, as well as Warsaw Główna rail station.

== Notable works ==
- Budownictwo ogólne (General building)

== Awards ==
- Officer's Cross (1946) and the Commander's Cross (1954) of the Order of Polonia Restituta
