= Skierniewice railway station =

Railway station in Skierniewice, Poland

Skierniewice
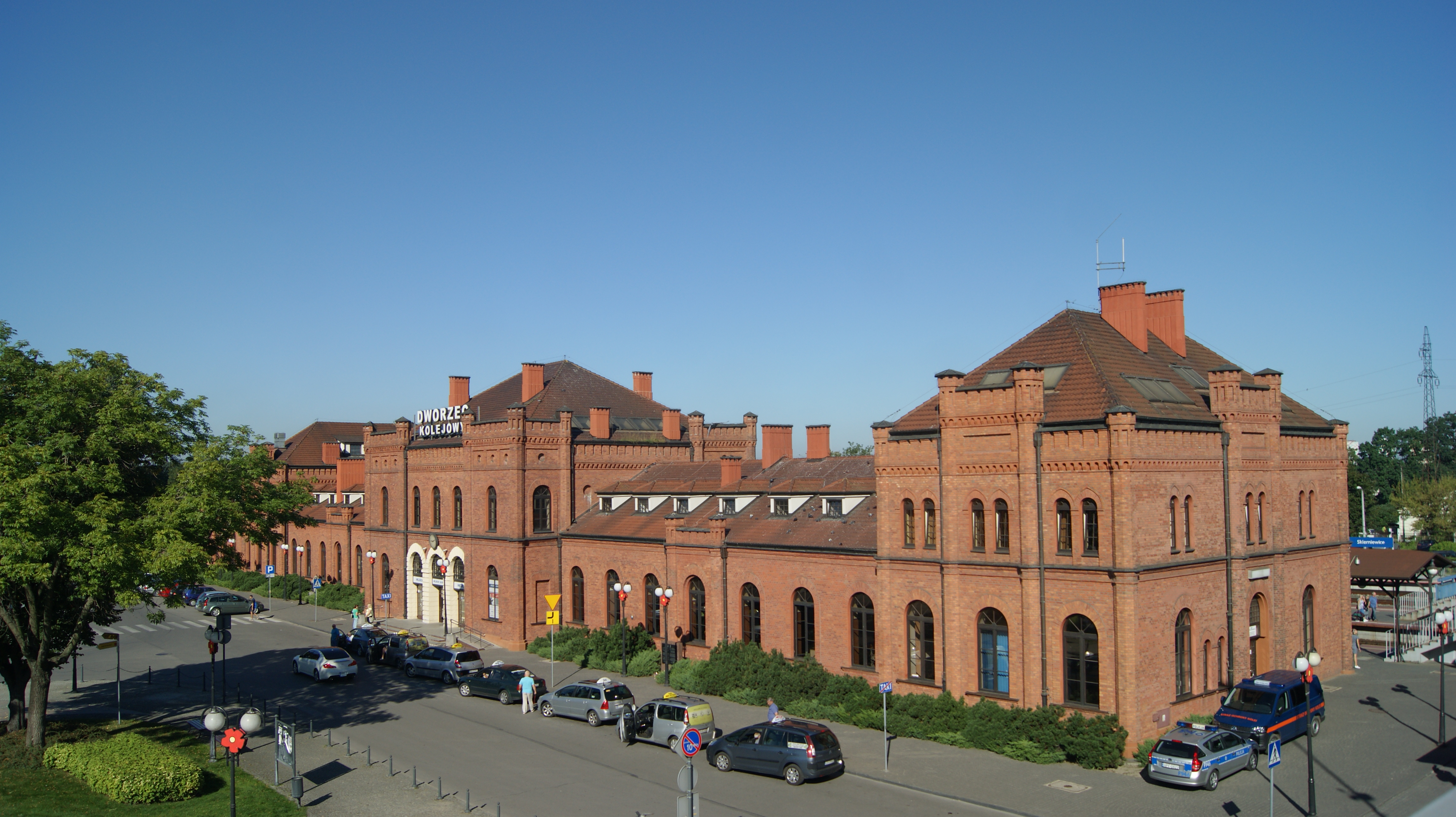

General information
- Location: Skierniewice, Łódź; Poland
- Coordinates: 51°58′03″N 20°09′01″E
- System: regional station
- Owner: Polskie Koleje Państwowe S.A.
- Platforms: 3
- Tracks: 4

Construction
- Structure type: Building: Yes

History
- Opened: 1845
Location

Skierniewice railway station is a railway station serving Skierniewice in Łódź Voivodeship, Poland. It is classed as a regional station on the classification of Polish railway stations and is served by Masovian Railways, which runs services from Skierniewice to Warszawa Wschodnia, and Łódź Agglomeration Railway which runs services to Warsaw, Łowicz and Łódź.

It was built as part of the second stage of the Warsaw–Vienna railway which opened in 1845. The station building was built in 1875, burnt 1914 and was rebuilt by architect Jan Heurich in the English Gothic style with neoclassical interior. Renovated 1980-2003 (plaster removed, brick walls shown),

== Train services ==
The station is served by the following service(s):

- Intercity services (IC) Łódź Fabryczna — Warszawa Główna/Warszawa Wschodnia
- Intercity services (IC) Łódź Fabryczna — Warszawa — Lublin Główny
- Intercity services (IC) Łódź Fabryczna — Warszawa — Gdańsk Glowny — Kołobrzeg
- Intercity services (IC) Łódź Fabryczna — Bydgoszcz — Gdynia Główna
- Intercity services (IC) Bydgoszcz Główna — Warszawa Główna
- Intercity services (IC) Wrocław- Opole - Częstochowa - Warszawa
- Intercity services (IC) Wrocław - Ostrów Wielkopolski - Łódź - Warszawa
- Intercity services (IC) Zgorzelec - Legnica - Wrocław - Ostrów Wielkopolski - Łódź - Warszawa
- Intercity services (IC) Białystok - Warszawa - Częstochowa - Opole - Wrocław
- Intercity services (IC) Białystok - Warszawa - Łódź - Ostrów Wielkopolski - Wrocław
- Intercity services (IC) Ełk - Białystok - Warszawa - Łódź - Ostrów Wielkopolski - Wrocław
- Intercity services (IC) Warszawa - Częstochowa - Katowice - Bielsko-Biała
- Intercity services (IC) Białystok - Warszawa - Częstochowa - Katowice - Bielsko-Biała
- Intercity services (IC) Kołobrzeg - Piła - Bydgoszcz - Warszawa - Lublin - Hrubieszów
- Intercity services (IC) Olsztyn - Warszawa - Skierniewice - Łódź
- Intercity services (IC) Olsztyn - Warszawa - Skierniewice - Częstochowa - Katowice - Bielsko-Biała
- Intercity services (IC) Olsztyn - Warszawa - Skierniewice - Częstochowa - Katowice - Gliwice - Racibórz
- Intercity services (TLK) Warszawa - Częstochowa - Lubliniec - Opole - Wrocław - Szklarska Poręba Górna
- Intercity services (TLK) Gdynia Główna — Zakopane
- InterRegio services (IR) Łódź Fabryczna — Warszawa Glowna
- InterRegio services (IR) Łódź Kaliska — Warszawa Glowna
- InterRegio services (IR) Ostrów Wielkopolski — Łódź — Warszawa Główna
- InterRegio services (IR) Poznań Główny — Ostrów Wielkopolski — Łódź — Warszawa Główna
- Regional services (ŁKA) Łódz - Skierniewice
- Regional services (ŁKA) Łódz - Warsaw
- Regional services (ŁKA) Skierniewice - Kutno

Preceding station	PKP Intercity	Following station
Żyrardów towards Warszawa Główna or Warszawa Wschodnia	IC 5via Lubliniec	Koluszki towards Łódź Fabryczna
Żyrardów towards Lublin Główny	IC	Koluszki towards Łódź Fabryczna
Żyrardów towards Kołobrzeg	IC	Koluszki towards Łódź Fabryczna
Żyrardów towards Warszawa Główna	IC	Łowicz Główny towards Bydgoszcz Główna
Żyrardów towards Warszawa Gdańska or Warszawa Wschodnia	IC	Koluszki towards Wrocław Główny
Żyrardów towards Białystok or Ełk	IC	Koluszki towards Wrocław Główny
Żyrardów towards Warszawa Wschodnia or Białystok	IC	Koluszki towards Bielsko-Biała Główna
Żyrardów towards Warszawa Wschodnia	IC	Koluszki towards Zgorzelec
Łowicz Główny towards Kołobrzeg	IC	Żyrardów towards Hrubieszów Miasto
Koluszki towards Łódź Fabryczna	IC	Żyrardów towards Olsztyn Główny
Koluszki towards Bielsko-Biała Główna or Racibórz	IC	Żyrardów towards Olsztyn Główny
Koluszki towards Szklarska Poręba Górna	TLK	Żyrardów towards Warszawa Wschodnia
Żyrardów towards Gdynia Główna	TLK	Koluszki towards Zakopane
Preceding station	Polregio	Following station
Lipce Reymontowskie towards Łódź Fabryczna	IR	Skierniewice Rawka towards Warszawa Główna
Lipce Reymontowskie towards Łódź Kaliska, Ostrów Wielkopolski or Poznań Główny	IR	Skierniewice Rawka towards Warszawa Główna
Preceding station	Masovian Railways	Following station
Terminus	R1	Skierniewice Rawka towards Warszawa Wschodnia or Warszawa Główna
Terminus	RE1	Skierniewice Rawka towards Warszawa Wschodnia or Warszawa Główna
Preceding station	ŁKA	Following station
Dąbrowice Skierniewickie towards Łódź Fabryczna	Łódź - Skierniewice	Terminus
Rogów towards Łódź Fabryczna	Łódź - Warsaw	Warszawa Zachodnia towards Warszawa Główna or Warszawa Wschodnia
Terminus	Skierniewice - Kutno	Mokra towards Kutno

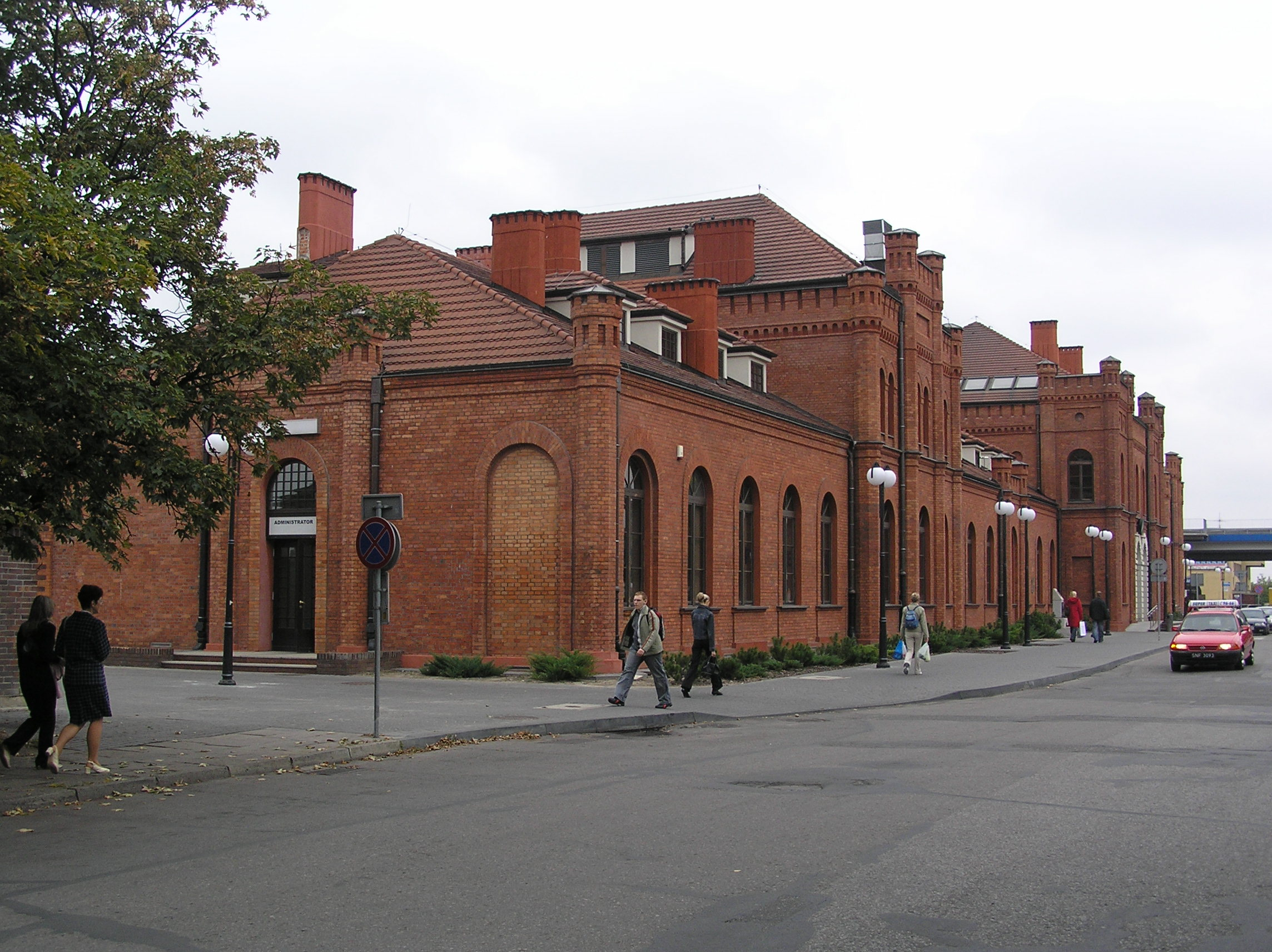

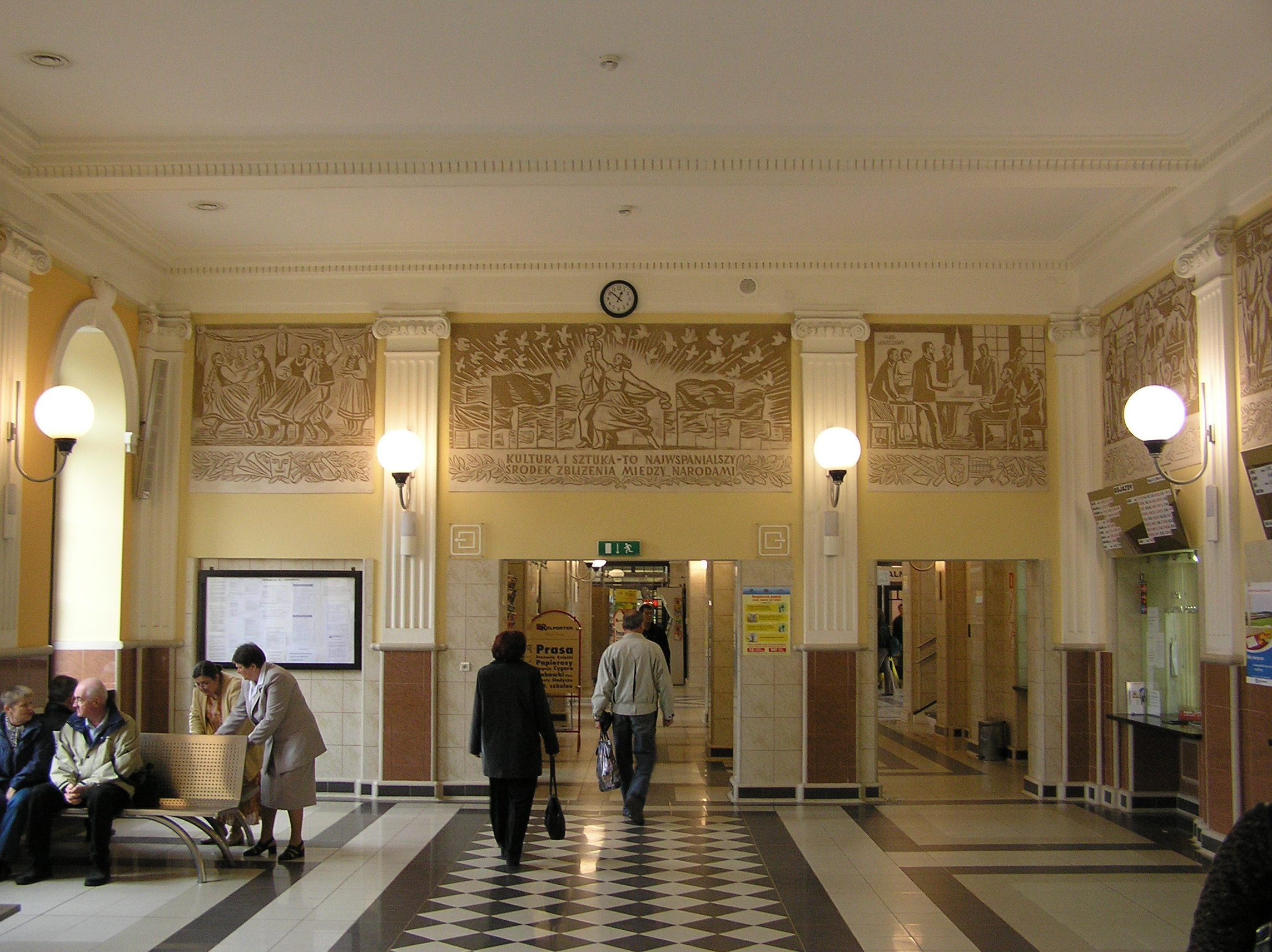

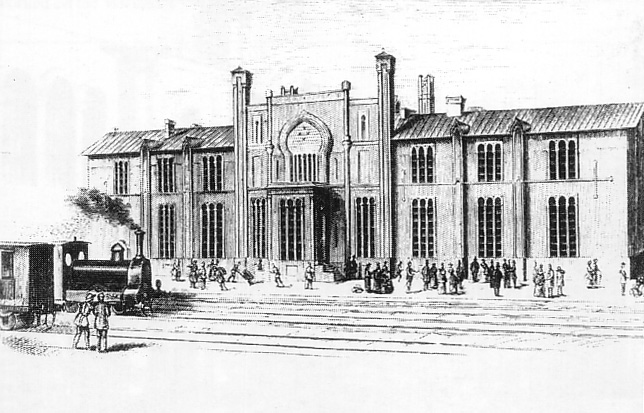
