= Warszawa Zachodnia station =

Railway station in Warsaw, Poland

Warszawa Zachodnia Warsaw West
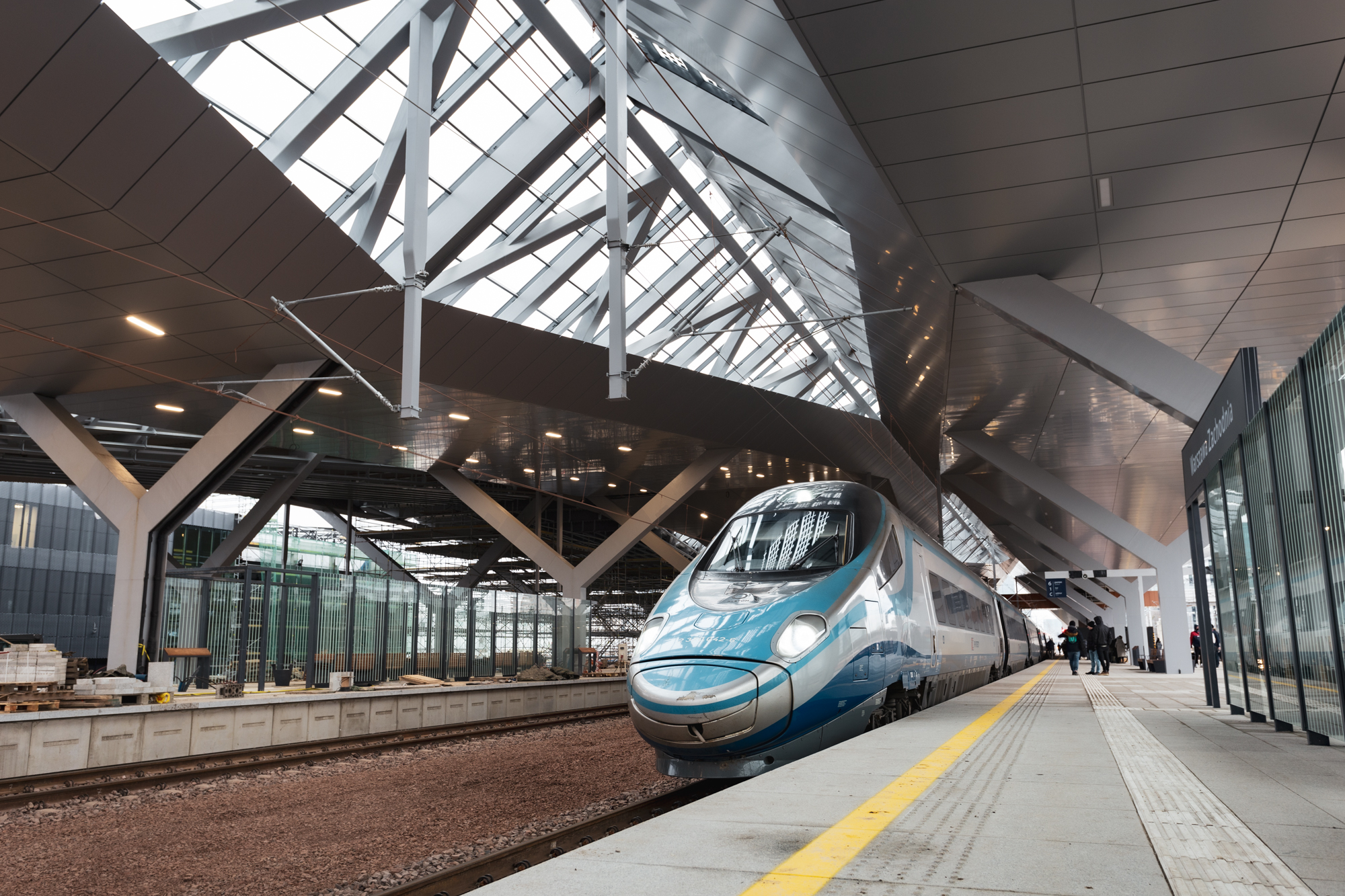
- Platform 6 in December 2021

General information
- Location: Ochota/Wola, Warsaw, Masovian Voivodeship; Poland
- Coordinates: 52°13′13″N 20°57′55″E
- Owner: PKP Polskie Linie Kolejowe
- Platforms: 9
- Tracks: 18

History
- Opened: 1936
- Former names: Warschau West before 1945
Location

Warszawa Zachodnia, in English Warsaw West, is a railway and long-distance bus station in Warsaw, Poland on the border of Ochota and Wola districts. The railway station is the western terminus of the Warsaw Cross-City Line. It is served by PKP Intercity, Polregio, Masovian Railways, Rapid Urban Railway (Warsaw) and Warsaw Commuter Railway, as well as international trains passing through Warsaw. It is one of the busiest railway stations in Poland, with over 1,100 trains a day.

The station underwent an extensive modernisation between 2020 and 2025, the first since its opening in 1936.

== History ==
The station was built as part of the development of the Warsaw Railway Junction that was begun in 1919. Warszawa Zachodnia was opened in 1936 as the most westerly station on the Warsaw Cross-City Line. However, later efforts went into developing the stations in the center of Warsaw. It was not until the 1970s that an underpass was built to connect the platforms and a station building was built on the northern side. In 1975, a platform for Warsaw Commuter Railway trains was added. In 1980, the south side of the station was developed, with a road underpass being built to connect Wola and Ochota and the long-distance bus station added. The Warszawa Wola railway station, built in the 1980s just 250 m (820 ft) away from Warszawa Zachodnia, on 20 May 2012 was incorporated to Warszawa Zachodnia station as Platform 8, and continues handling trains to Nasielsk, Ciechanów and Działdowo. In 2015 a new station building was opened at the southern side of the station along with several commercial office buildings, which among others host companies of the Polish State Railways, built along Warsaw's Jerozolimskie Avenue on grounds belonging to the station complex. Future development plans call for the construction of a new tramway line by the Warsaw tramways with an 850 m-long (2,790 ft) tunnel passing under the railway station, offering convenient transfer to the city's public transit system.

== Platform 9 ==
Once an independent station in Warsaw's Wola district, Warszawa Wola now serves as Platform 9 of the Warszawa Zachodnia railway complex. On 20 May 2012 it was incorporated into Warszawa Zachodnia station as its Platform 8, and since the modernisation of Warszawa Zachodnia, it is currently marked as Warszawa Zachodnia peron 9 (Warsaw West railway station platform No. 9. Despite the change, it maintains all the functionality of Warszawa Wola. Another railway stop named Warszawa Wola, known as Warszawa Kasprzaka until 2018 is located further within the Wola district on Prymasa Tysiąclecia Avenue.

The station was built in the 1980s just 250 m (820 ft) from Warszawa Zachodnia station on the Warsaw orbital line, which goes through Warszawa Gdańska station. At the time of building, it served the workers who commuted to the neighbouring factories in the surrounding industrial area. As of 2011, it is used exclusively by Masovian Railways who run the KM9 services from it through the north of the Masovian Voivodeship to Działdowo, in the Warmian-Masurian Voivodeship via Legionowo, Modlin, Nasielsk, Ciechanów and Mława, at all of which some trains terminate. Currently, all trains terminate at this station, but tracks exist and are used by freight trains to join the Cross-City Line past Warszawa Zachodnia station.

== Modernization during 2020-2025 ==
In July, 2020 a contract worth 2.4 billion złoty (about $500 million euro) was signed for a complete modernization of the station, which was completed in 2025. The rebuilt station has platforms covered by a common roof. The planned tunnel to a new underground tram stop is still under construction as of January 2026. During the five years of construction the passengers experienced some reductions in service, with some trains rerouted to other stations in Warsaw. The station upgrade is part of the upgrade of the entire Warsaw Cross-City Line, which will last at least until 2027.

== Train services ==
Most long-distance trains going to Warszawa Centralna from the western direction also stop at Warszawa Zachodnia. The station also services regional trains which do not stop at Warszawa Centralna, as well as a smaller number of trains that do not travel across Warsaw and instead terminate at Warszawa Główna.

The station is served by the following service(s):

- EuroCity services (EC) (EC 95 by DB) (EIC by PKP) Berlin - Frankfurt (Oder) - Rzepin - Poznań - Kutno - Warsaw
- Express Intercity Premium services (EIP) Gdynia - Warsaw
- Express Intercity Premium services (EIP) Warsaw - Wrocław
- Express Intercity Premium services (EIP) Warsaw - Katowice - Bielsko-Biała
- Express Intercity Premium services (EIP) Gdynia - Warsaw - Katowice - Gliwice/Bielsko-Biała
- Express Intercity Premium services (EIP) Warsaw - Kraków
- Express Intercity Premium services (EIP) Gdynia/Kołobrzeg - Warsaw - Kraków (- Rzeszów)
- Express Intercity services (EIC) Szczecin — Warsaw
- Express Intercity services (EIC) Warsaw - Wrocław
- Express Intercity services (EIC) Warsaw - Kraków - Zakopane
- Intercity services (IC) Warsaw (Główna) — Łódź
- Intercity services (IC) Bydgoszcz Główna — Warszawa Główna
- Intercity services (IC) Wrocław- Opole - Częstochowa - Warszawa
- Intercity services (IC) Wrocław - Ostrów Wielkopolski - Łódź - Warszawa
- Intercity services (IC) Białystok - Warszawa - Częstochowa - Opole - Wrocław
- Intercity services (IC) Białystok - Warszawa - Łódź - Ostrów Wielkopolski - Wrocław
- Intercity services (IC) Ełk - Białystok - Warszawa - Łódź - Ostrów Wielkopolski - Wrocław
- Intercity services (IC) Białystok - Warszawa - Częstochowa - Katowice - Bielsko-Biała
- Intercity services (IC) Olsztyn - Warszawa - Skierniewice - Łódź
- Intercity services (IC) Olsztyn - Warszawa - Skierniewice - Częstochowa - Katowice - Bielsko-Biała
- Intercity services (IC) Olsztyn - Warszawa - Skierniewice - Częstochowa - Katowice - Gliwice - Racibórz
- Intercity services (TLK) Warszawa - Częstochowa - Lubliniec - Opole - Wrocław - Szklarska Poręba Górna
- Intercity services (TLK) Warszawa - Częstochowa - Katowice - Opole - Wrocław - Szklarska Poręba Górna
- Intercity services (TLK) Gdynia Główna — Zakopane
- InterRegio services (IR) Łódź Fabryczna — Warszawa Glowna
- InterRegio services (IR) Łódź Kaliska — Warszawa Glowna
- InterRegio services (IR) Ostrów Wielkopolski — Łódź — Warszawa Główna
- InterRegio services (IR) Poznań Główny — Ostrów Wielkopolski — Łódź — Warszawa Główna
- Regional services (ŁKA) Łódz - Warsaw

=== International connections ===
Warszawa Zachodnia serves the following international connections:

- Prague (via Bohumin)
- Wien (via Bohumin and Breclav)
- Munich (via Bohumin, Breclav, Wien and Salzburg)
- Budapest (via Bohumin and Breclav)
- Berlin (via Frankfurt)
- Kiev
- Rijeka and Koper (via Bohumin, Breclav, Wien and Ljubljana)

Preceding station	PKP Intercity	Following station
Kutno towards Berlin Hbf	EuroCity EC 95; EIC	Warszawa Centralna towards Warszawa Wschodnia
Terminus	Kyiv-Express	Warszawa Centralna towards Kyiv-Pasazhyrskyi
Warszawa Centralna towards Warszawa Wschodnia	EIP	Częstochowa Stradom towards Wrocław Główny
Warszawa Centralna towards Warszawa Wschodnia	EIP	Sosnowiec Główny towards Bielsko-Biała Główna
Warszawa Centralna towards Gdynia Główna	EIP	Sosnowiec Główny towards Gliwice or Bielsko-Biała Główna
Warszawa Centralna towards Warszawa Wschodnia	EIP	Kraków Główny Terminus
Warszawa Centralna towards Gdynia Główna or Kołobrzeg	EIP	Kraków Główny towards Kraków Główny or Rzeszów Główny
Kutno towards Szczecin Główny	EIC	Warszawa Centralna towards Warszawa Wschodnia
Warszawa Centralna towards [[ railway station|]]	EIC	Częstochowa Stradom towards Wrocław Główny
Warszawa Centralna towards [[ railway station|]]	EIC	Kraków Główny towards Zakopane
Żyrardów towards Łódź Fabryczna	IC	Warszawa Główna Terminus
Warszawa Główna Terminus	IC	Żyrardów towards Bydgoszcz Główna
Warszawa Centralna towards Warszawa Wschodnia	IC	Żyrardów towards Wrocław Główny
Warszawa Centralna towards Białystok or Ełk	IC	Żyrardów towards Wrocław Główny
Warszawa Centralna towards Białystok	IC	Żyrardów towards Bielsko-Biała Główna
Żyrardów towards Łódź Fabryczna	IC	Warszawa Centralna towards Olsztyn Główny
Żyrardów towards Bielsko-Biała Główna or Racibórz	IC	Warszawa Centralna towards Olsztyn Główny
Żyrardów towards Szklarska Poręba Górna	TLK via Lubliniec	Warszawa Centralna towards Warszawa Wschodnia
Grodzisk Mazowiecki towards Szklarska Poręba Górna	TLK via Katowice	Warszawa Centralna towards Warszawa Wschodnia
Warszawa Centralna towards Gdynia Główna	TLK	Grodzisk Mazowiecki towards Zakopane
Preceding station	Polregio	Following station
Grodzisk Mazowiecki towards Łódź Fabryczna	IR	Warszawa Główna Terminus
Grodzisk Mazowiecki towards Łódź Kaliska, Ostrów Wielkopolski or Poznań Główny	IR	Warszawa Główna Terminus
Preceding station	Masovian Railways	Following station
Warszawa Włochy towards Skierniewice	R1	Warszawa Główna Terminus
Warszawa Włochy towards Skierniewice	R1	Warszawa Ochota towards Warszawa Wschodnia
Jaktorów towards Skierniewice	RE1	Warszawa Centralna towards Warszawa Wschodnia
Terminus	R2	Warszawa Ochota towards Łuków
Warszawa Włochy towards Kutno	R3	Warszawa Ochota towards Warszawa Wschodnia
Terminus	R6	Warszawa Ochota towards Czyżew
Terminus	R7	Warszawa Ochota towards Dęblin
Warszawa Aleje Jerozolimskie towards Góra Kalwaria or Skarżysko-Kamienna	R8	Warszawa Wola towards Warszawa Wschodnia
Warszawa Rakowiec towards Góra Kalwaria or Skarżysko-Kamienna	RE8	Warszawa Wola towards Warszawa Wschodnia
Terminus	R9	Warszawa Ochota towards Działdowo via Warszawa Śródmieście
Terminus	RE9	Warszawa Centralna towards Działdowo via Warszawa Centralna
Terminus	R90	Warszawa Wola towards Działdowo via Warszawa Gdańska
Terminus	RE90	Warszawa Wola towards Działdowo via Warszawa Gdańska
Warszawa Aleje Jerozolimskie towards Warsaw Chopin Airport	RL	Warszawa Centralna towards Modlin
Preceding station	ŁKA	Following station
Skierniewice towards Łódź Fabryczna	Łódź - Warsaw	Warszawa Centralna towards Warszawa Wschodnia
Skierniewice towards Łódź Fabryczna	Łódź - Warsaw	Warszawa Główna Terminus
Preceding station	SKM Warsaw	Following station
Warszawa Włochy towards Pruszków	S1	Warszawa Ochota towards Otwock
Warszawa Aleje Jerozolimskie towards Warsaw Chopin Airport	S2	Warszawa Ochota towards Sulejówek Miłosna
Warszawa Wola towards Warsaw Chopin Airport	S3	Warszawa Aleje Jerozolimskie towards Legionowo Piaski or Radzymin
Warszawa Wola towards Piaseczno	S4	Warszawa Aleje Jerozolimskie towards Zegrze Południowe
Warszawa Wola towards Piaseczno	S40	Warszawa Aleje Jerozolimskie towards Warszawa Rakowiec
Warszawa Reduta Ordona towards Piaseczno	S40	Warszawa Ochota towards Warszawa Rakowiec

== Gallery ==
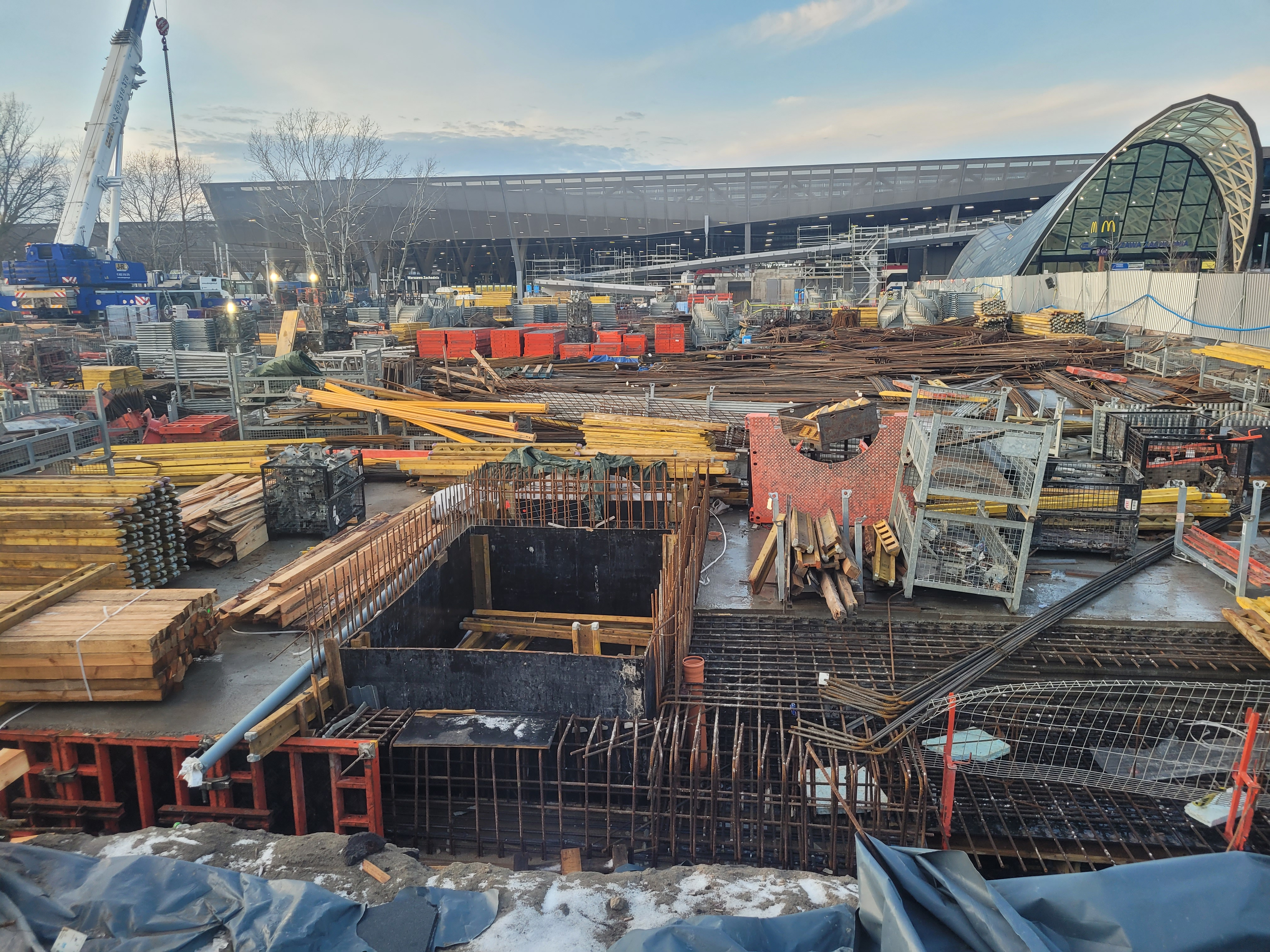
Construction around the southern face, January 2025

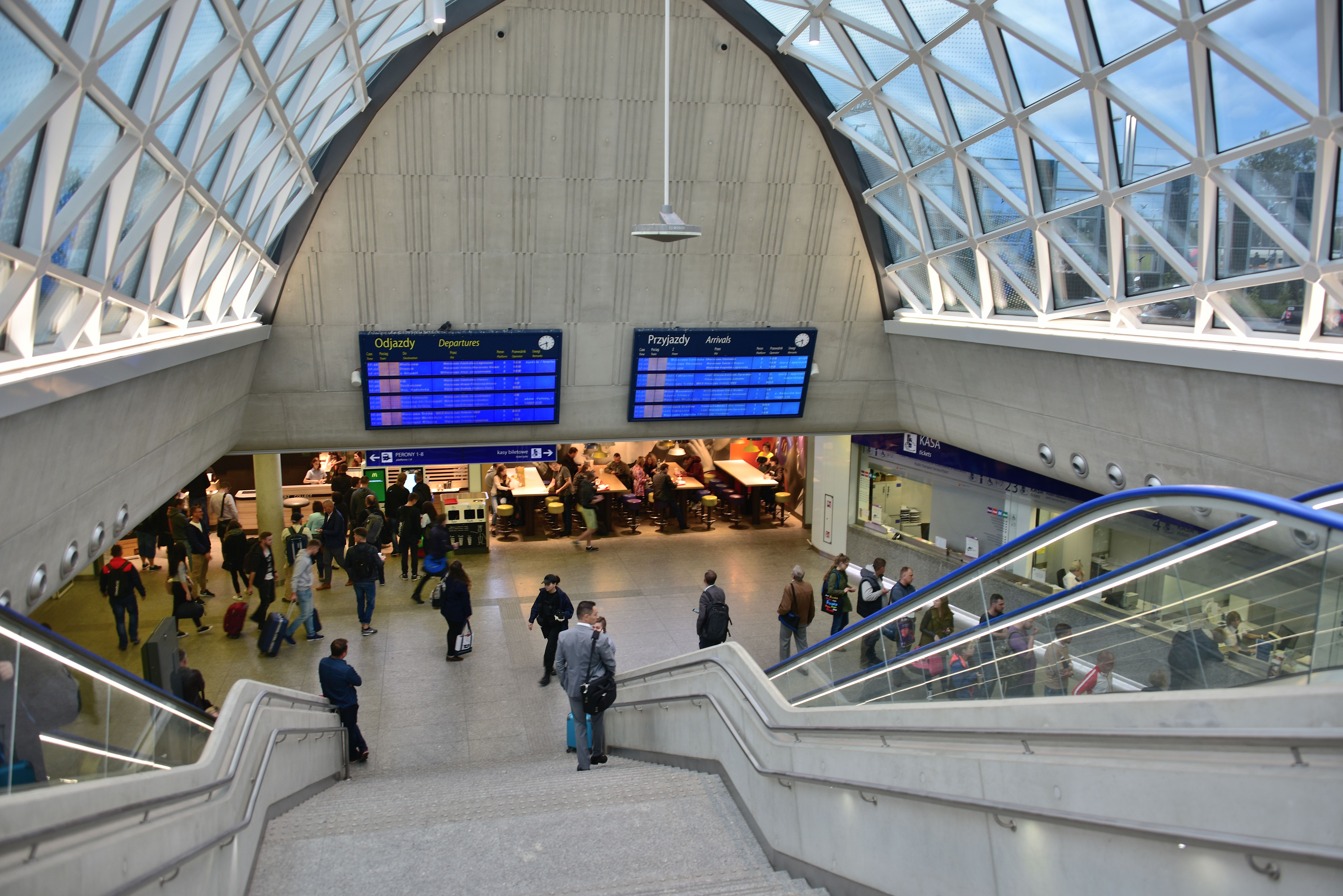
Interior of the southern entrance hall, 2017

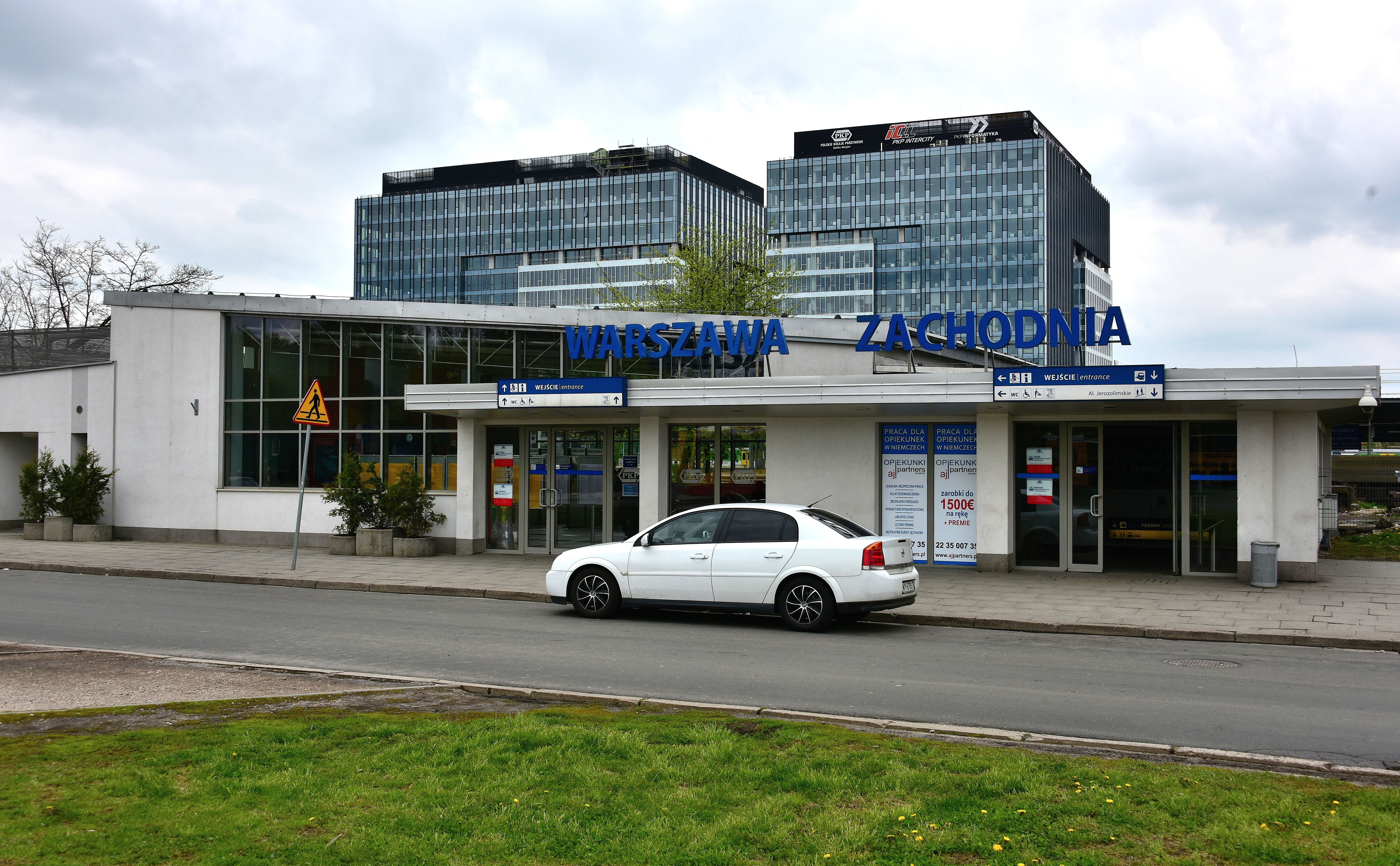
Old station building at the northern side (Now demolished)

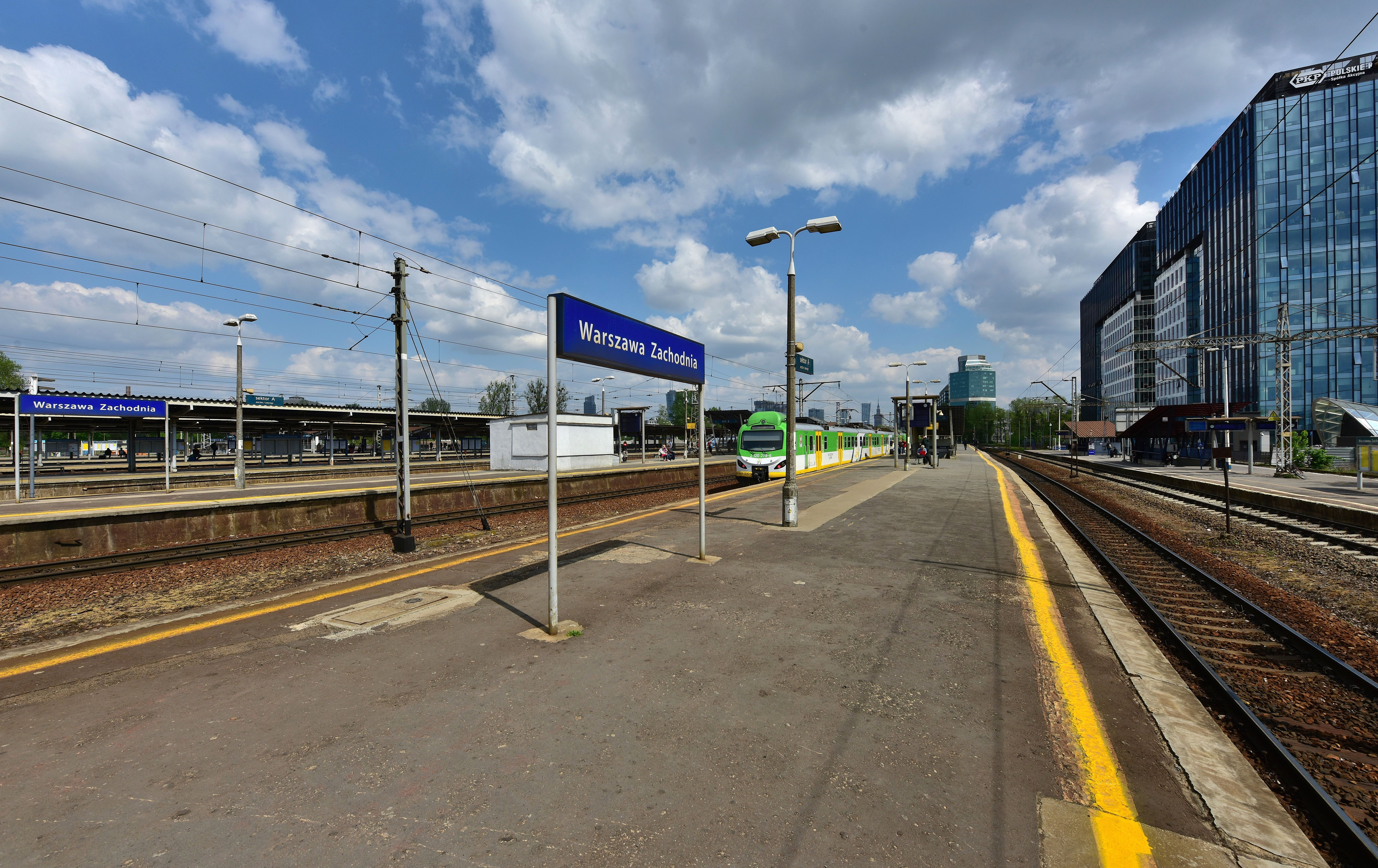
Station platforms before 2020s modernisation with Śródmieście skyline in the background, 2019

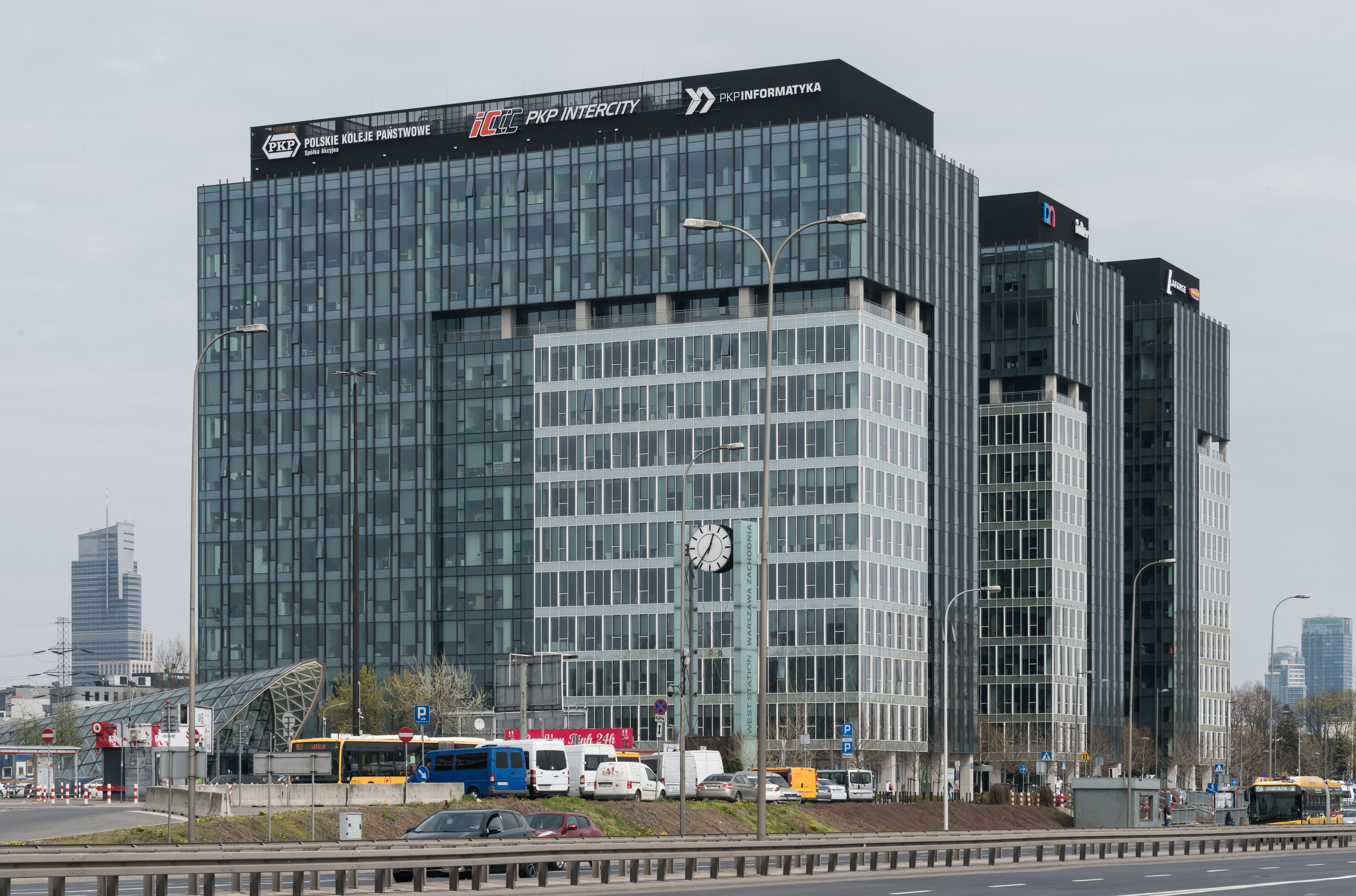
West Station commercial office complex
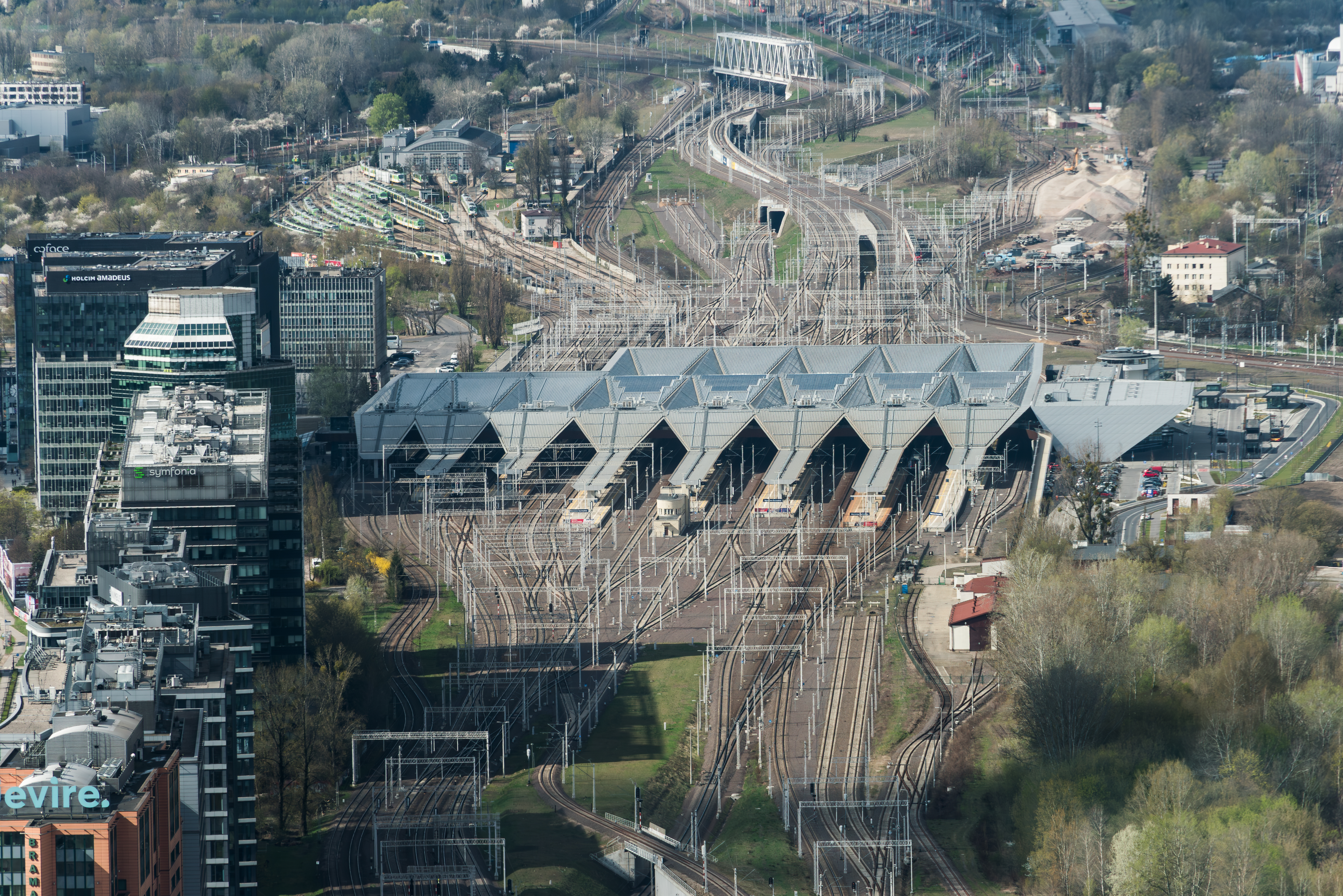
Warsaw West railway station as seen from Varso Tower

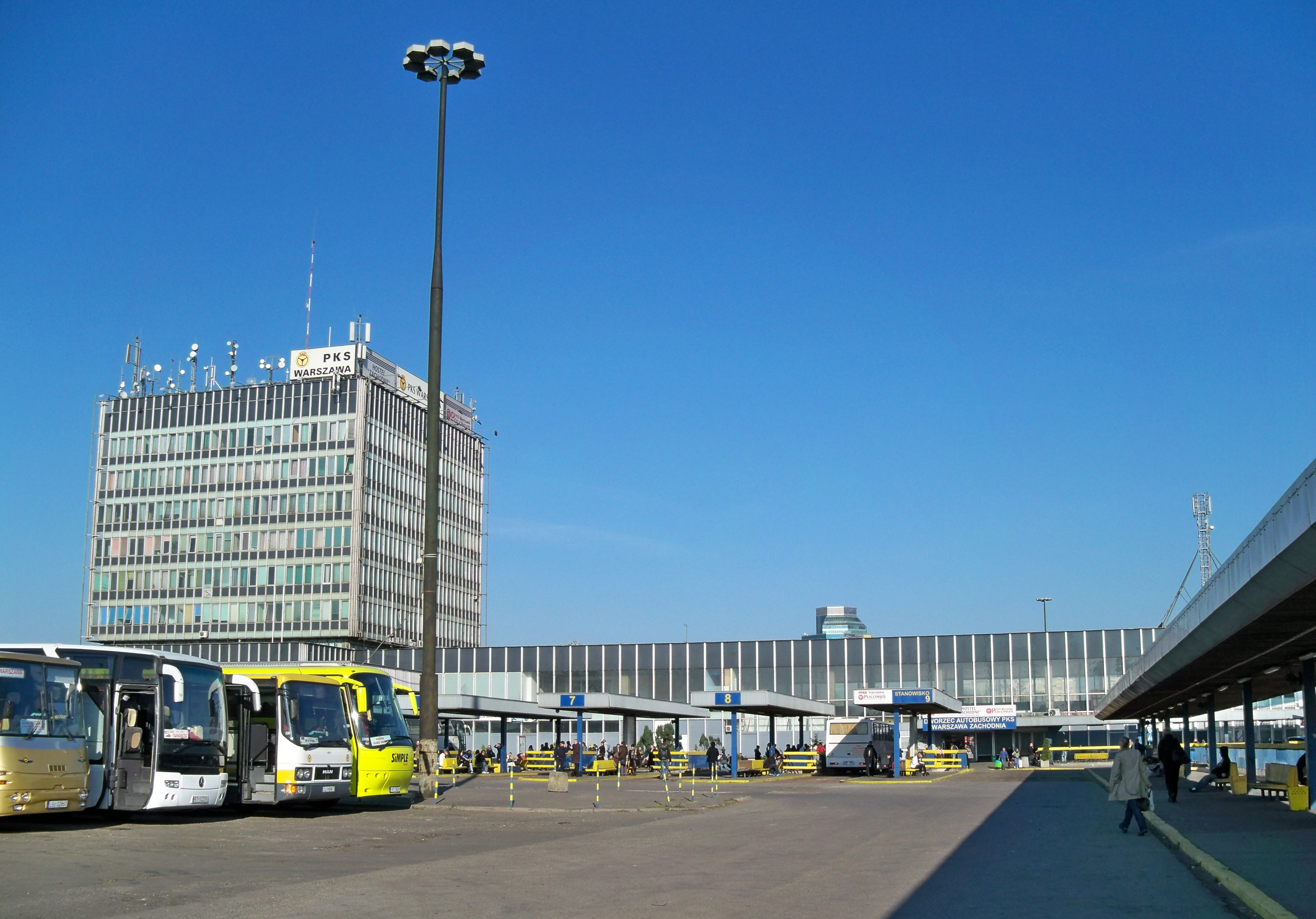
Long-distance bus station

== See also ==
- Rail transport in Poland
- List of busiest railway stations in Poland
