= Warszawa Główna railway station =

Railway station in Warsaw, Poland

Warszawa Główna
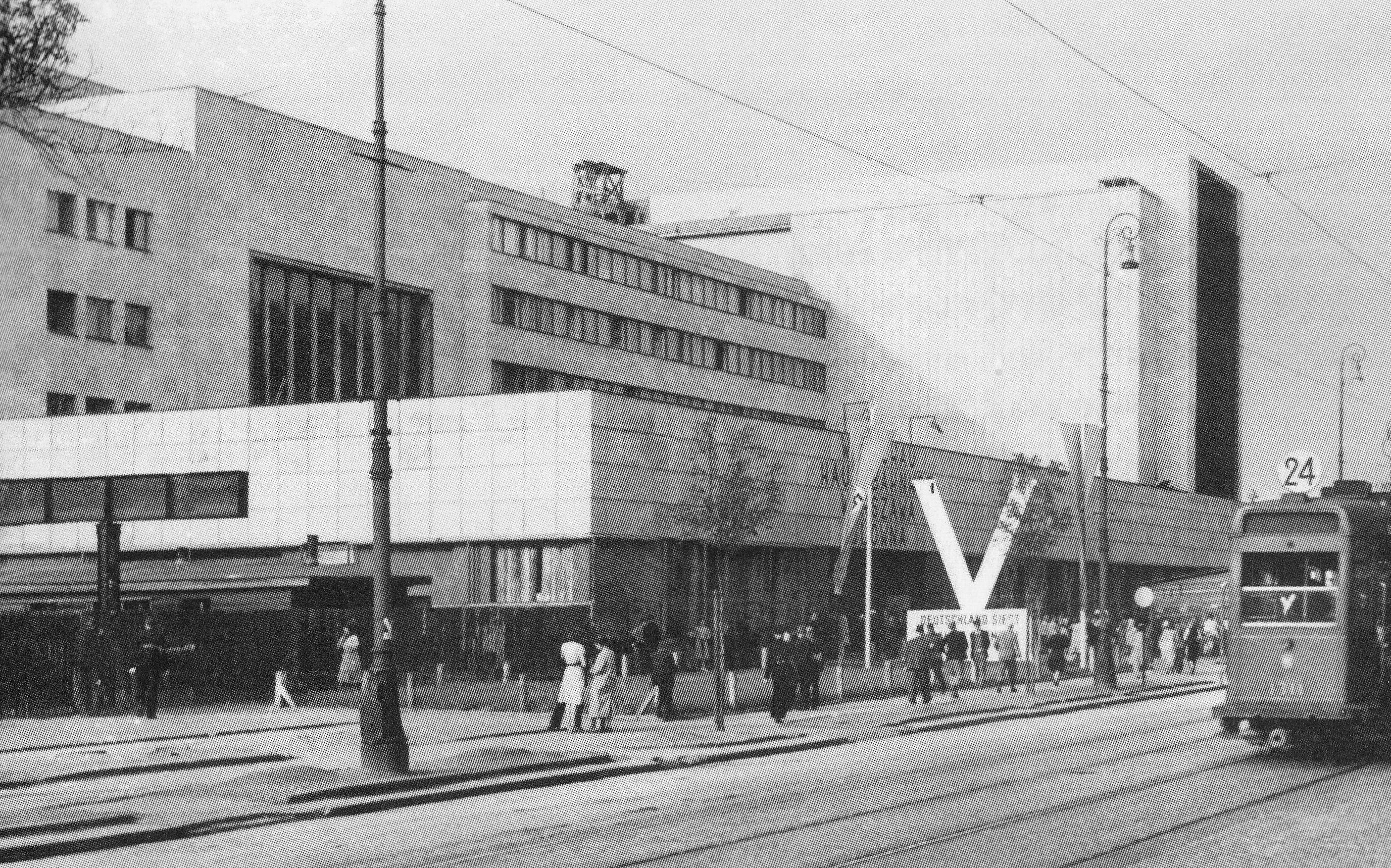
- Station building in 1940

General information
- Location: Warsaw; Poland
- Coordinates: 52°13′35″N 20°59′14″E
- Owner: Polskie Koleje Państwowe S.A., Gedob

History
- Former names: Warschau Hauptbahnhof (Warszawa Główna) (1939–1944); Warszawa Główna Osobowa (?–2021)

Services
Preceding station	PKP Intercity	Following station
Warszawa Zachodnia towards Łódź Fabryczna	IC	Terminus
Warszawa Zachodnia towards Bydgoszcz Główna	IC	Terminus
Warszawa Zachodnia towards Kraków Główny	EIP	Terminus
Preceding station	Polregio	Following station
Warszawa Zachodnia towards Łódź Fabryczna	IR	Terminus
Warszawa Zachodnia towards Łódź Kaliska	IR	Terminus
Warszawa Zachodnia towards Ostrów Wielkopolski	IR	Terminus
Warszawa Zachodnia towards Poznań Główny	IR	Terminus
Preceding station	Masovian Railways	Following station
Warszawa Zachodnia towards Skierniewice	R1	Terminus
Warszawa Zachodnia towards Skierniewice	RE1	Terminus
Warszawa Zachodnia towards Kutno	R3	Terminus
Preceding station	ŁKA	Following station
Warszawa Zachodnia towards Łódź Fabryczna	Łódź - Warsaw	Terminus
Preceding station	SKM Warsaw	Following station
Warszawa Zachodnia towards Pruszków	S1	Terminus
Location

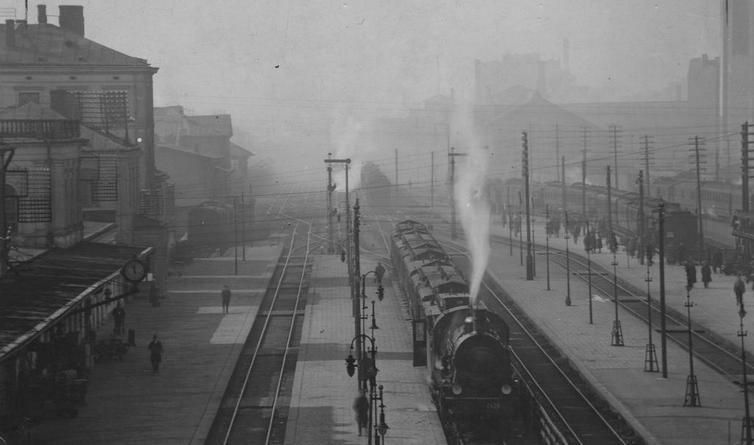
Platforms of the Warszawa Główna railway station in 1925 (originally the Vienna railway station until 1919)

Warsaw Main Station (Polish: Warszawa Główna) was the name of two different railway stations in Warsaw, Poland, both now defunct.

A smaller terminus station with two platforms again named Warszawa Główna opened on 14 March 2021. The name was retained for historical reasons only, and the actual main station in Warsaw is Warszawa Centralna located about 1 km to the east. The reopened station now serves as a terminus for the Łódź Metropolitan Railway (ŁKA) and some Masovian, InterRegio, and PKP Intercity trains from the direction of Łódź as well as a shortened route for trains from Piaseczno of the Warsaw Fast Urban Railway (SKM).

== History ==
The first idea of construction of a main Warsaw station, which would have been the nexus of all rail lines in the city, appeared in 1879. In practical terms, with one standard gauge line and a few broad gauge railway lines terminating in Warsaw in the 19th century, creating a single 'main' station would have been far from a trivial proposition. However, when Poland regained its independence and the standard gauge was universally adopted, this project was revived. In 1921, when works on the modernization of the Warsaw railway hub started, it became clear that it was necessary to demolish the obsolete Vienna Station. This having been done, passenger traffic was taken over by a temporary station on Chmielna street, which opened in 1921. On 7 June 1927, the Soviet ambassador to Poland, Pyotr Voykov was fatally shot by a White émigré at the station while meeting Arkady Rosengolts, the former ambassador from the USSR to the United Kingdom.

== Construction ==
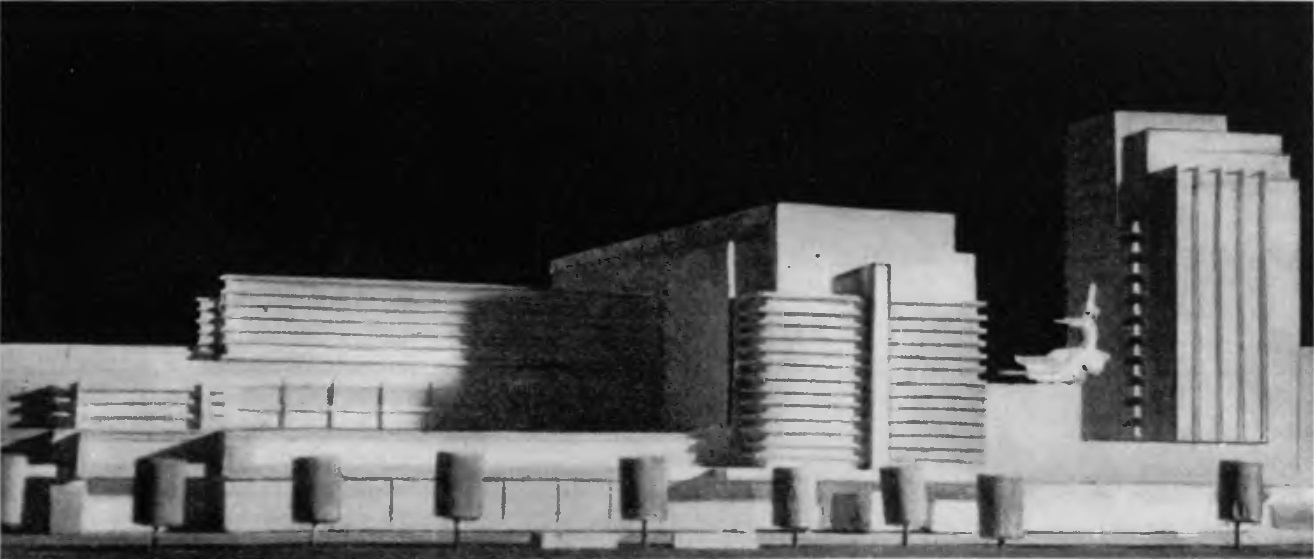
A mockup of an early plan for the Warszawa Główna station building.

It was decided that after the demolition of the Vienna Station, a new station would be constructed. The works began in 1932, and the monumental complex was designed by architects Czesław Przybylski and Andrzej Pszenicki, while Wacław Żenczykowski was the structural engineer. The station was supposed to become the most important railway station of the Second Polish Republic and one of the most modern in contemporary Europe. The complex was to be furnished with most modern appliances, including electric heating.

The station building was located along the Warsaw's main street, Aleje Jerozolimskie, roughly on the site of the present day Warszawa Śródmieście railway station between Marszałkowska and Emilii Plater street and the platforms were in a tunnel on the Warsaw Cross-City Line.

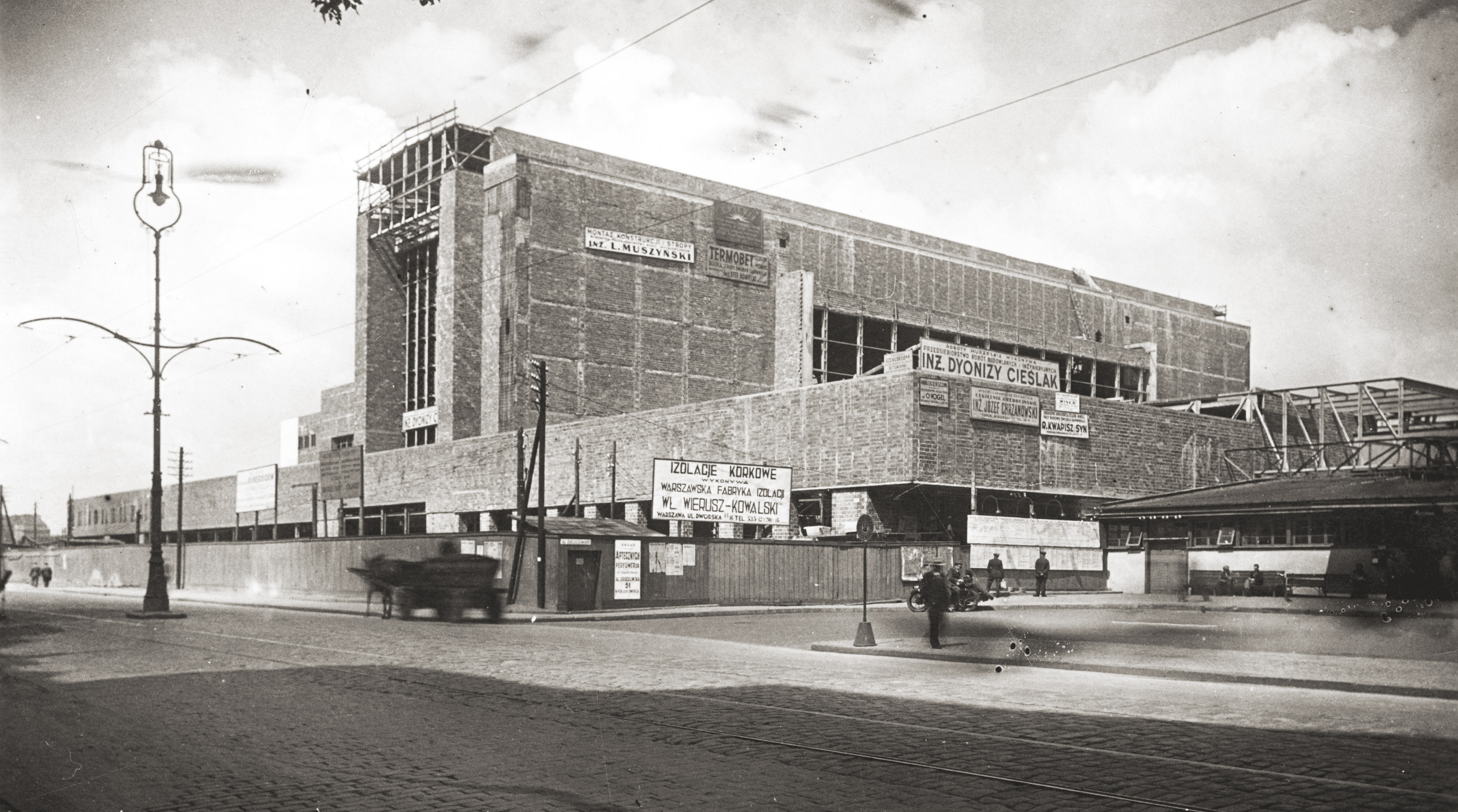
Station building under construction in 1938

The station was designed in the Modernist Style, with then popular Art deco elements. The architects intended for the station to be multi-functional; plenty of space had been designed for various stores, entertainment, and restaurants. As construction continued in 1938, first passengers were able to use the partly completed station, however, the building was never completed because of the outbreak of the Second World War.

== World War II ==
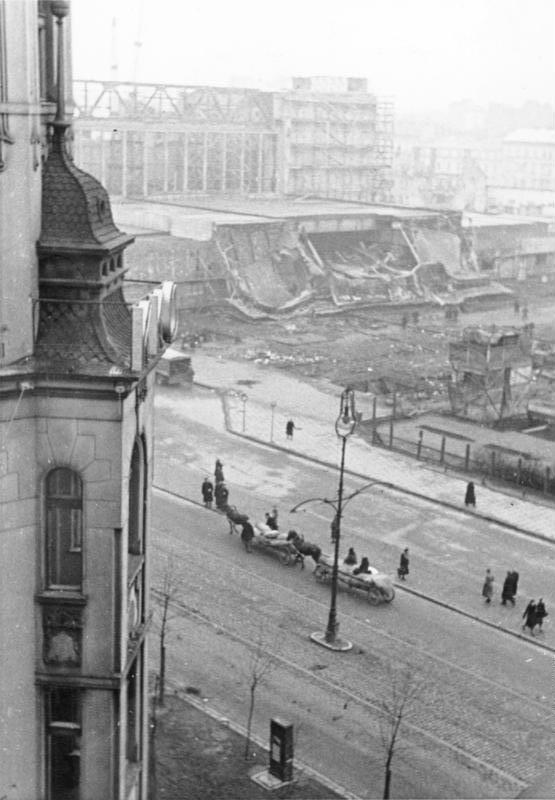
Damaged Warsaw Main Station, seen during the German occupation from the Hotel Polonia Palace, 12 November 1939

A few weeks before the war, on 6 June 1939, the still unfinished station was partly destroyed in a fire which had been started by a team of reckless welding contractors. Initially many people believed that it had been an act of sabotage by German or Soviet agents. During the course of fighting the fire, led personally by the minister of the interior Felicjan Sławoj-Składkowski, one fireman died and three were wounded.

In September 1939, the station was damaged during the Siege of Warsaw by German aerial bombardment. The occupational authorities carried out some provisional repairs, covering the burned out building with a new roof. The station, though still unfinished and partly destroyed, remained operational until the Warsaw Uprising. Four months after the fall of the Uprising, in January 1945 the Germans shortly before retreating, blew the remains up as part of their planned destruction of the city.

== Postwar ==
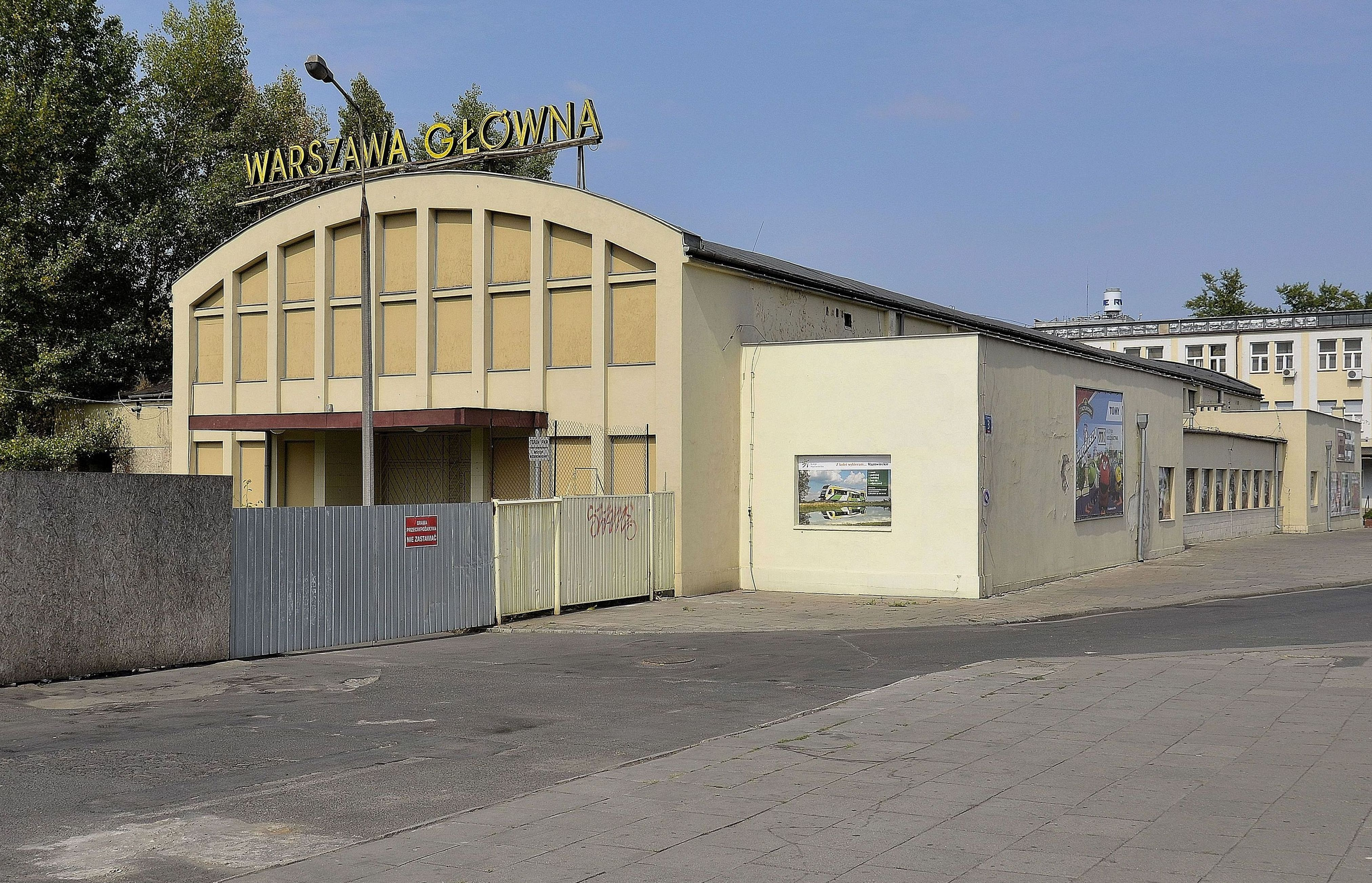
Building of post-WWII station (2015)

After the war, a makeshift Warszawa Główna station was created to the west of city center in the district of Wola, using tracks of a former goods yard and a temporary wooden building on Towarowa Street, serving westbound trains. With the reconstruction of the cross city line since 1963 some trains started bypassing the station and after the opening of the new Warszawa Centralna railway station in 1975 it took over the role of Warsaw's principal station, but some scheduled and special trains continued to use the Warszawa Główna station until 1997. The wooden building is still standing in 2023, though in a very poor condition, and houses a part of the Warsaw Railway Museum. One of the platforms is home to a seasonal night market, where bars, restaurants and cafes offer food and drinks to Varsovians on Tuesday, Friday, Saturday and Sunday nights.

Construction of new tracks and platforms on the site of the station started in March 2018 and the first train from the re-opened station ran on 14 March 2021. It serves trains running to Łowicz, Sochaczew, Dobieszyn, Skierniewice and Łódź Fabryczna. The station is also to act as a terminus for long-distance trains during the planned renovation of the cross-city line.

Until 2021 the station was officially called Warsaw Main Passenger (Warszawa Główna Osobowa), signifying it was dedicated exclusively for passenger trains. Following the restoration of regular traffic in 2021 the name was simplified dropping the last segment, while a separate station Warszawa Główna Towarowa dedicated to freight trains, named so in 2000, retains its full name. The station name misleading suggests it is the main station of Warsaw in line with the naming convention of the Polish Railways, when it is in fact only a minor station serving a small number of regional trains.

== Train services ==
The station is served by the following service(s):

- Intercity services (IC) Łódź Fabryczna — Warszawa Główna
- Intercity services (IC) Bydgoszcz Główna — Warszawa Główna
- InterRegio services (IR) Łódź Fabryczna — Warszawa Glowna
- InterRegio services (IR) Łódź Kaliska — Warszawa Glowna
- InterRegio services (IR) Ostrów Wielkopolski — Łódź — Warszawa Główna
- InterRegio services (IR) Poznań Główny — Ostrów Wielkopolski — Łódź — Warszawa Główna
- Regional services (ŁKA) Łódz - Warsaw
- Suburban services (SKM) Piaseczno - Warsaw

Preceding station	PKP Intercity	Following station
Warszawa Zachodnia towards Łódź Fabryczna	IC	Terminus
Warszawa Zachodnia towards Bydgoszcz Główna	IC	Terminus
Warszawa Zachodnia towards Kraków Główny	EIP	Terminus
Preceding station	Polregio	Following station
Warszawa Zachodnia towards Łódź Fabryczna	IR	Terminus
Warszawa Zachodnia towards Łódź Kaliska	IR	Terminus
Warszawa Zachodnia towards Ostrów Wielkopolski	IR	Terminus
Warszawa Zachodnia towards Poznań Główny	IR	Terminus
Preceding station	Masovian Railways	Following station
Warszawa Zachodnia towards Skierniewice	R1	Terminus
Warszawa Zachodnia towards Skierniewice	RE1	Terminus
Warszawa Zachodnia towards Kutno	R3	Terminus
Preceding station	ŁKA	Following station
Warszawa Zachodnia towards Łódź Fabryczna	Łódź - Warsaw	Terminus
Preceding station	SKM Warsaw	Following station
Warszawa Zachodnia towards Pruszków	S1	Terminus

== Bibliography ==
- Jerzy S. Majewski, Warszawa nieodbudowana. Lata trzydzieste, Warszawa, 2005, ISBN 83-85584-91-9.
