= Masovian Railways =

Polish railway company

Masovian Railways Ltd.

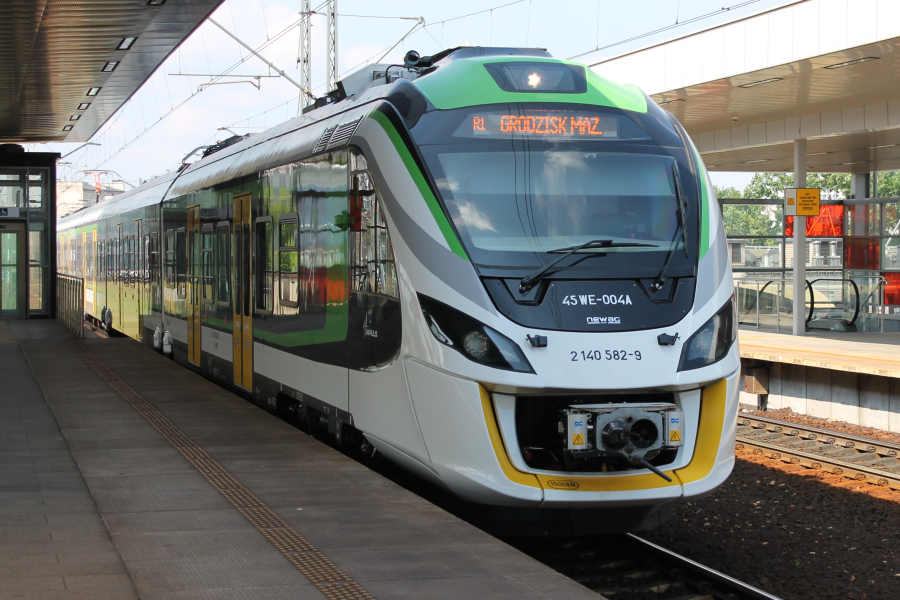
- 45WE of Masovian Railways
- Native name: Koleje Mazowieckie
- Type: Ltd.
- Industry: Rail transport
- Founded: 2004
- Headquarters: Warsaw, Poland
- Area served: Masovia
- Key people: Artur Radwan; CEO
- Owner: Masovian Voivodeship
- Website: www.mazowieckie.com.pl

Masovian Railways (Polish: Koleje Mazowieckie; KMKOL) is a regional rail operator in the Masovian Voivodeship of Poland.

== History ==
The company was founded in 2004 as a joint venture of the Masovian Voivodeship, with 51% shares, and the then government-owned PKP Polregio, with 49% shares, to handle local passenger traffic in the Voivodeship. It started operating on 1 January 2005. Since the end of 2007 Masovian Railways has been fully owned by the Masovian Voivodeship.

In November 2025, the Warsaw-Lublin rail line was the target of explosive sabotage during the Russia-Ukraine conflict. The rail was reportedly sabotaged to prevent resources from being given to Ukraine.

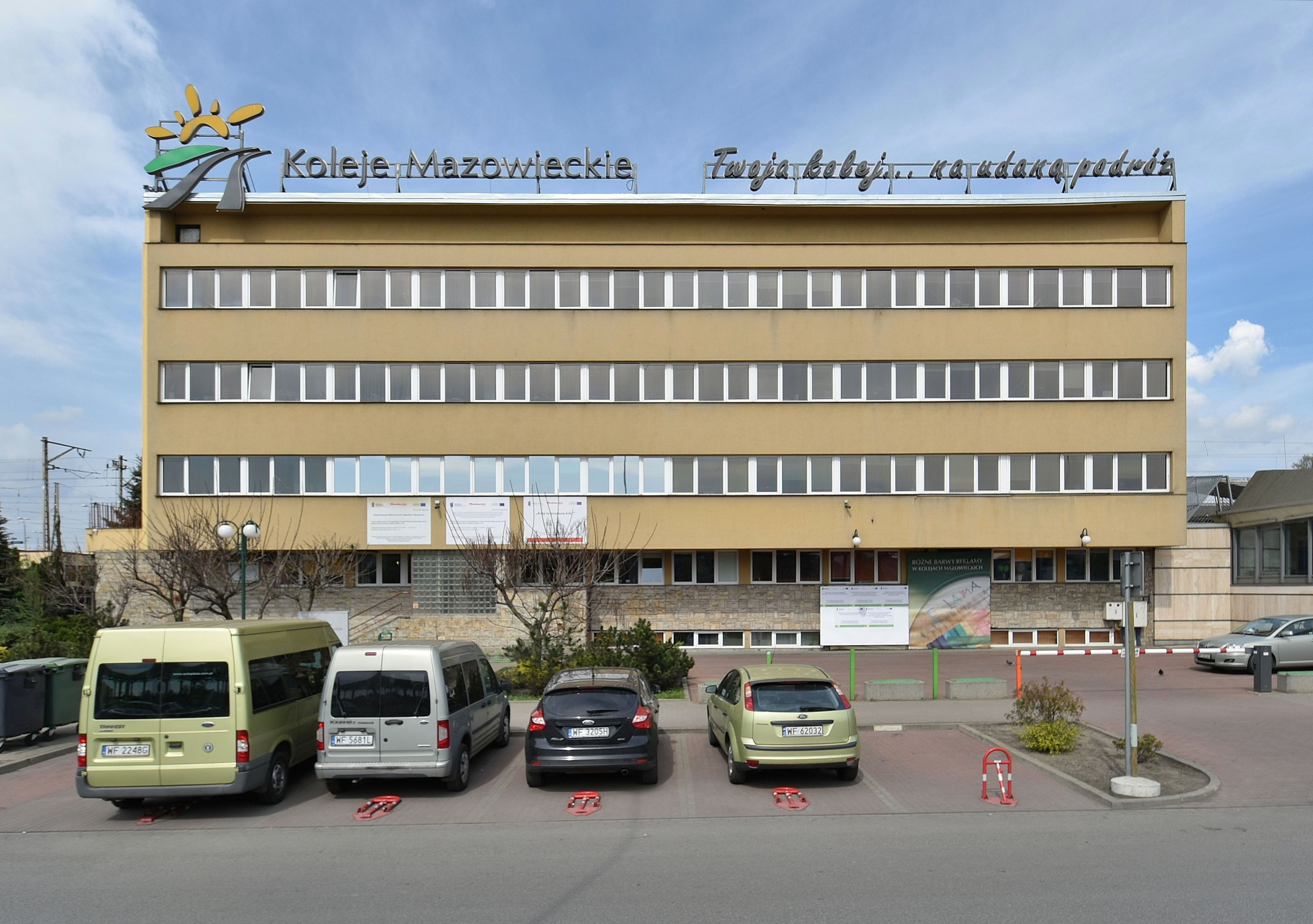
Headquarters in Warsaw

== Rolling stock ==
At the beginning, the rolling stock consisted of old electric multiple units taken over from the Polish State Railways. These were gradually modernised, and further units purchased second-hand from other operators. Later on, the company purchased or leased new rolling stock. As of 2010 the Masovian Railways had just under 200 PKP class EN57, five EN71 and two EW60. Additionally, the company purchased seven DB Class 627 railcars and four 628 diesel multiple units to serve on non-electrified routes.

In 2008 the company bought 10 modern Stadler FLIRT EMUs and 26 Bombardier Double-deck Coaches along with 11 cab cars. At the beginning, Masovian Railways leased 11 EU07 electric locomotives from PKP Cargo to work these trains, since 2011 they are pulled by TRAXX P160 DC purchased from Bombardier.

In 2011 the company bought 16 PESA ELF EMUs designated class EN76 and 4 SA135 DMUs also from PESA.

In January 2018 the company ordered 71 Stadler Flirt EMUs.

As of May 2021, the company owns, leases, or hires the following rolling stock:

Class	Image	Cars per set	Type	Top speed		Number	Builder	Built
Class	Image	Cars per set	Type	km/h	mph	Number	Builder	Built
EU47		N/A	Electric locomotive	160	99	11	Bombardier	2011
111Eb		N/A	Electric locomotive	160	99	2	PESA SA	2016
ABbfmnopuvxz / Bmnopuxz		varies	Double-decker coach	160	99	37 (incl. 11 driving trailers)	Bombardier	2008
B16bfmnopuxz / B16mnopuxz		usually 6 + driving trailer	Double-decker coach	160	99	22 (incl. 2 driving trailers)	PESA SA	2015
EN57		3	Electric multiple unit	110	68	185	Pafawag	1962-1994
EW60		3	Electric multiple unit	100	62	2	Pafawag	1990
EN71		4	Electric multiple unit	110	68	6	Pafawag	1976-1984
ER75		4	Electric multiple unit	160	99	10	Stadler	2008
EN76		4	Electric multiple unit	160	99	16	PESA SA	2012-2014
45WE		5	Electric multiple unit	160	99	12	Newag	2015
VT627		1	Diesel multiple unit	120	75	6	LHB	1974-1982
VT628		2	Diesel multiple unit	120	75	4	MAN	1974
SA135		1	Diesel multiple unit	120	75	6	PESA SA	2010-2011
222M		2	Diesel multiple unit	130	81	2	Newag	2013
ER160		5	Electric multiple unit	160	99	61	Stadler	2019–present

== Railway lines ==
=== Lines across the Warsaw Cross-City Line ===

- R1 line to Skierniewice, through Pruszków, Grodzisk Mazowiecki, Żyrardów
- R2 line to Łuków, through Sulejówek, Mińsk Mazowiecki, Siedlce
- R3 line to Kutno, through Sochaczew, Łowicz
- R6 line to Tłuszcz, through Wołomin
- R7 line to Dęblin, through Otwock, Pilawa
- RL express line to Modlin

=== Lines through Warszawa Gdańska and Warszawa Wileńska stations ===
==== Warszawa Gdańska ====
- R80 line to Góra Kalwaria, Radom Główny, Skarżysko Kamienna through Piaseczno, Warka
- R90 line to Działdowo, Mława through Legionowo, Nasielsk

==== Warszawa Wileńska ====
- R60 line to Czyżew through Małkinia, Tłuszcz

=== Minor lines ===
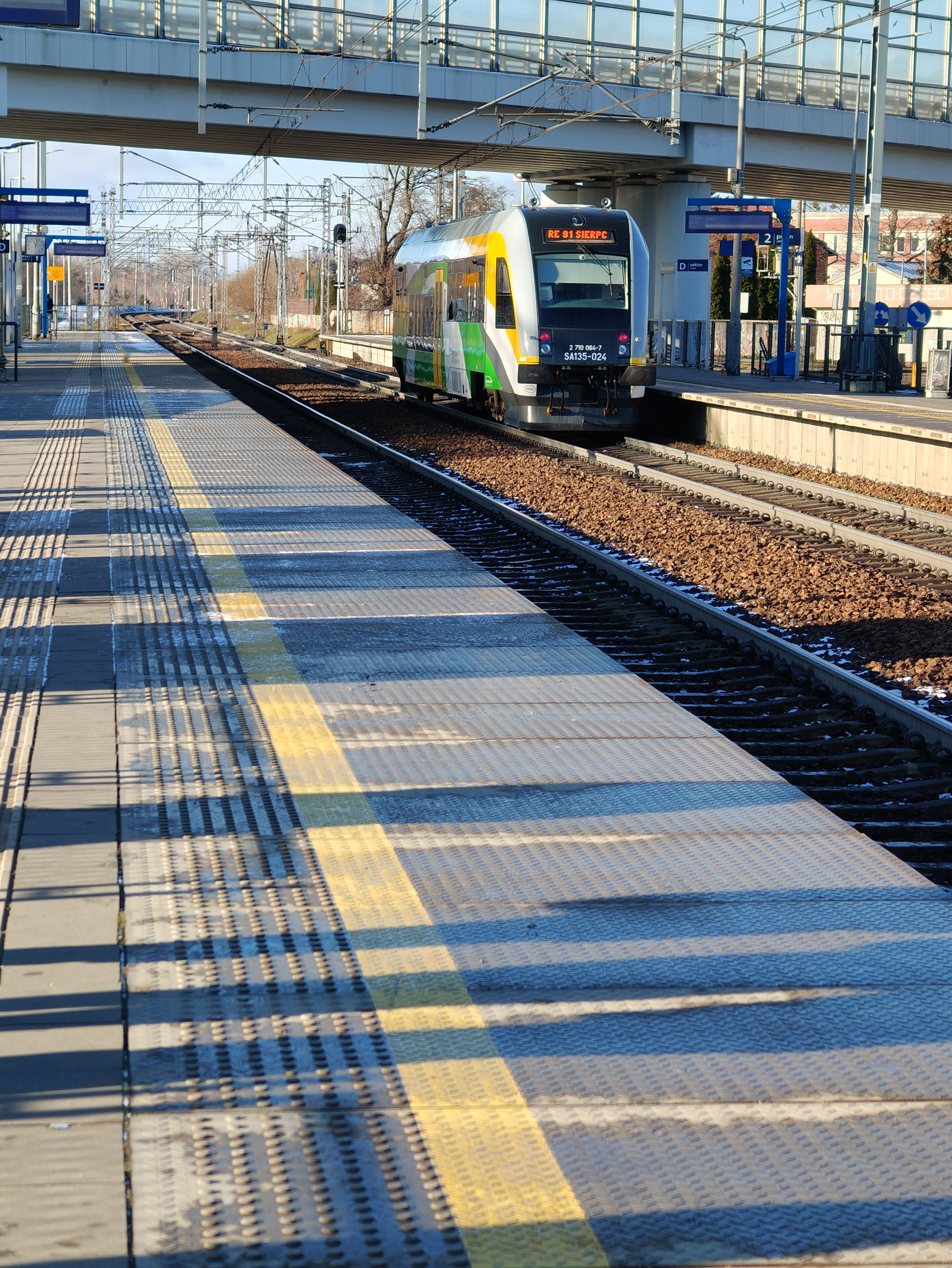
KM railbus at Nowy Dwór Mazowiecki station

- R21 line from Siedlce to Czeremcha
- R31 line from Sierpc, through Płock, to Kutno
- R61/62 line from Tłuszcz to Szczytno
- R81 line from Radom to Dęblin
- R82 line from Radom to Drzewica
- R91 line from Nasielsk to Sierpc
- R92 line from Legionowo to Tłuszcz (no train is running right now)

=== Regional Express ===
Mazovia Railways is launching regional express services on the following routes:

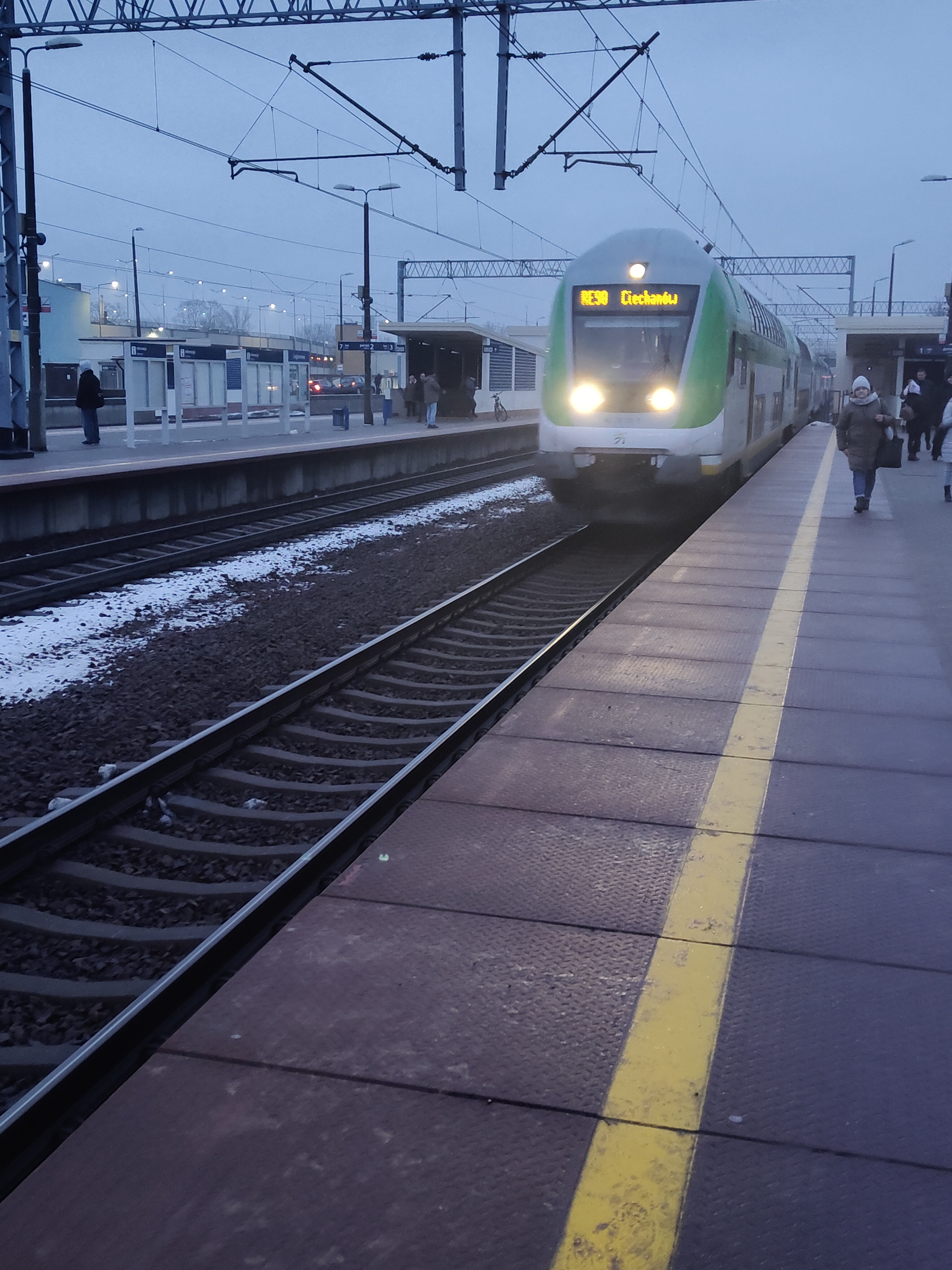
KM regional express – RE90 'Ciechan' arriving at Legionowo station

Name	Meaning	Designation	Route
Wiedenka	a female inhabitant of Vienna (Wiedeń in Polish) but refers to common name of the Warsaw–Vienna railway line through Skierniewice	RE1	Warszawa Wschodnia – Skierniewice
Bolimek	refers to Bolimów Landscape Park	RE1	Warszawa Wschodnia – Żyrardów/Siedlce – Skierniewice
Łukowianka/Łukowiak	a female/male inhabitant of Łuków	RE2	Warszawa Służewiec – Łuków Warszawa Zachodnia – Łuków
Czeremszak	diminutive of the town name ‘Czeremcha’	RE21	Warszawa Wschodnia – Czeremcha
Bzura	a name of the river passing through Łowicz, Sochaczew	RE3	Warszawa Wschodnia – Łowicz Główny
Mazoviak/Mazovia/Siemowit		RE31	Warszawa Wschodnia – Płock
Czyżyk	a name of bird or diminutive of the town name ‘Czyżew’	RE6	Warszawa Zachodnia – Czyżew Czyżew – Grodzisk Mazowiecki
Kurpiak	a name of inhabitant from "Kurpie" ethnic group	RE61	Warszawa Zachodnia – Ostrołęka
Radomiak	a male inhabitant of Radom	RE80	Warszawa Wschodnia – Skarżysko-Kamienna
Radomianka	a female inhabitant of Radom	RE80	Warszawa Wschodnia – Radom Główny
Kamienna	a second part of city name 'Skarżysko-Kamienna'	RE80	Warszawa Gdańska – Skarżysko-Kamienna Skarżysko-Kamienna – Ciechanów
Ciechan	diminutive of the town name ‘Ciechanów’	RE90	Warszawa Zachodnia – Ciechanów
Działdowiak	diminutive of the town name ‘Działdowo’	RE90	Warszawa Zachodnia – Działdowo
–	–	RE90	Warszawa Zachodnia – Nasielsk
–	–	RE91/92	Sierpc – Tłuszcz (through Wieliszew)

==== Other express trains ====
- Słoneczny from Warsaw to Gdynia or Ustka, through Legionowo, Nasielsk, Działdowo, Gdańsk (only in summer, R9 line, the name means Sunny)
- Słoneczny bis
- Dragon from Warsaw to Krakow (no train is running, line suspended)

== Cooperation with Warsaw public transport system ==
Within the Warsaw metropolitan area, long- and medium-term tickets issued by the Public Transport Authority (those valid for 24 hours or longer), previously validated in city buses, trams, metro or Fast Urban Rail are honoured in all regular trains of Masovian Railways.

== See also ==
- Rapid Urban Railway (Warsaw) (SKM) - Rapid transit and commuter rail system in the Warsaw metropolitan area.
- Warszawska Kolej Dojazdowa (WKD) - Light rail commuter line in Poland's capital city of Warsaw.
- Polskie Koleje Państwowe S.A. - Dominant railway operator in Poland.
- Polregio - Polish railway operator; formerly Przewozy Regionalne.
