= Warszawa Radość railway station =

Railway station in Warsaw, Poland

Warszawa Radość
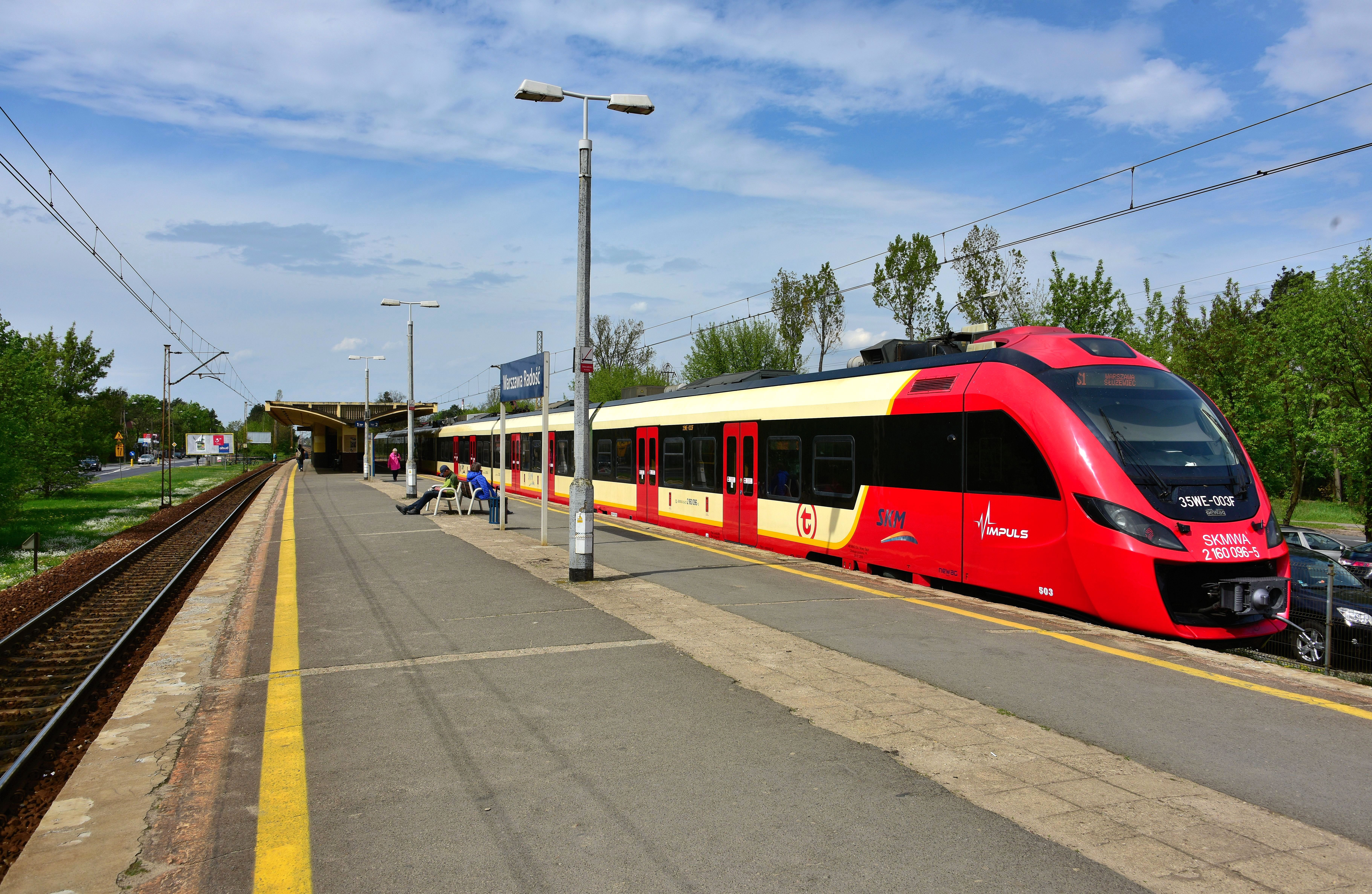

General information
- Location: Wawer, Warsaw, Masovian; Poland
- Coordinates: 52°11′09″N 21°11′14″E
- Owner: Polskie Koleje Państwowe S.A.
- Platforms: 1
- Tracks: 2

Services
Preceding station	Masovian Railways	Following station
Warszawa Międzylesie towards Warszawa Zachodnia	R7	Warszawa Miedzeszyn towards Dęblin
Preceding station	SKM Warsaw	Following station
Warszawa Międzylesie towards Pruszków	S1	Warszawa Miedzeszyn towards Otwock
Warszawa Międzylesie towards Warszawa Wschodnia	S10	Warszawa Miedzeszyn towards Otwock
Location
- Warszawa Radość located on the Warsaw Railway Junction

Warszawa Radość railway station is a railway station in the Wawer district of Warsaw, Poland. As of 2012, it is served by Masovian Railways, who run the KM7 services from Warszawa Zachodnia to Dęblin and by Rapid Urban Railway (Warsaw), who run the S1 services from Pruszków PKP to Otwock.
