= Warszawa Wawer railway station =

Railway station in Warsaw, Poland

Warszawa Wawer
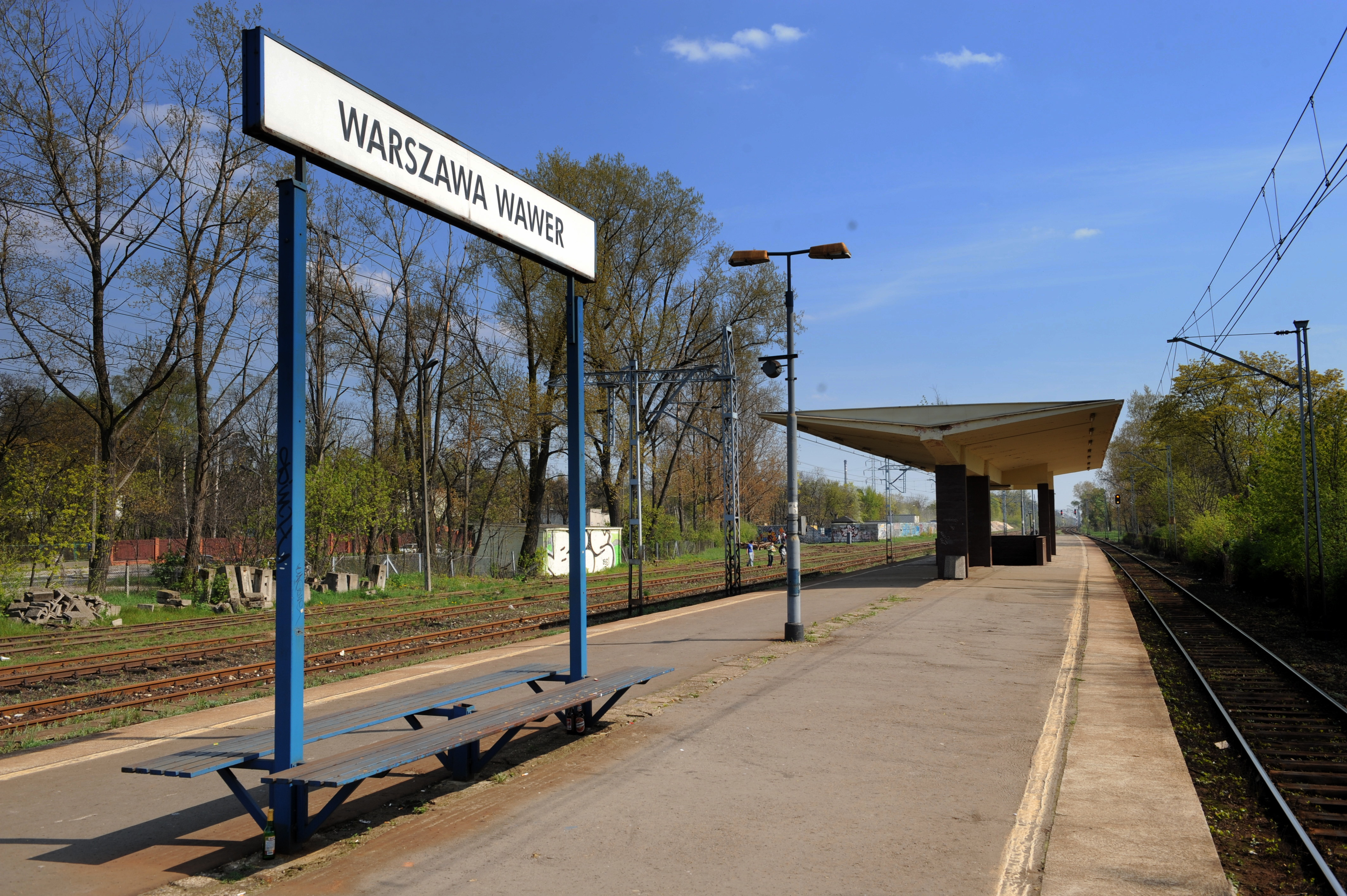

General information
- Location: Wawer, Warsaw, Masovian; Poland
- Coordinates: 52°13′24″N 21°08′58″E
- Owner: Polskie Koleje Państwowe S.A.
- Platforms: 1
- Tracks: 2

History
- Opened: 1877

Services
Preceding station	Masovian Railways	Following station
Warszawa Gocławek towards Warszawa Zachodnia	R7	Warszawa Anin towards Dęblin
Preceding station	SKM Warsaw	Following station
Warszawa Gocławek towards Pruszków	S1	Warszawa Anin towards Otwock
Warszawa Gocławek towards Warszawa Wschodnia	S10	Warszawa Anin towards Otwock
Location
- Warszawa Wawer located on the Warsaw Railway Junction

Warszawa Wawer railway station is a railway station in the Wawer district of Warsaw, Poland. As of 2012, it is served by Masovian Railways, which operates the KM7 services from Warszawa Zachodnia to Dęblin), and by Rapid Urban Railway (Warsaw), which operates the S1 services from Pruszków PKP to Otwock.
