= Warszawa Falenica railway station =

Railway station in Warsaw, Poland

Warszawa Falenica
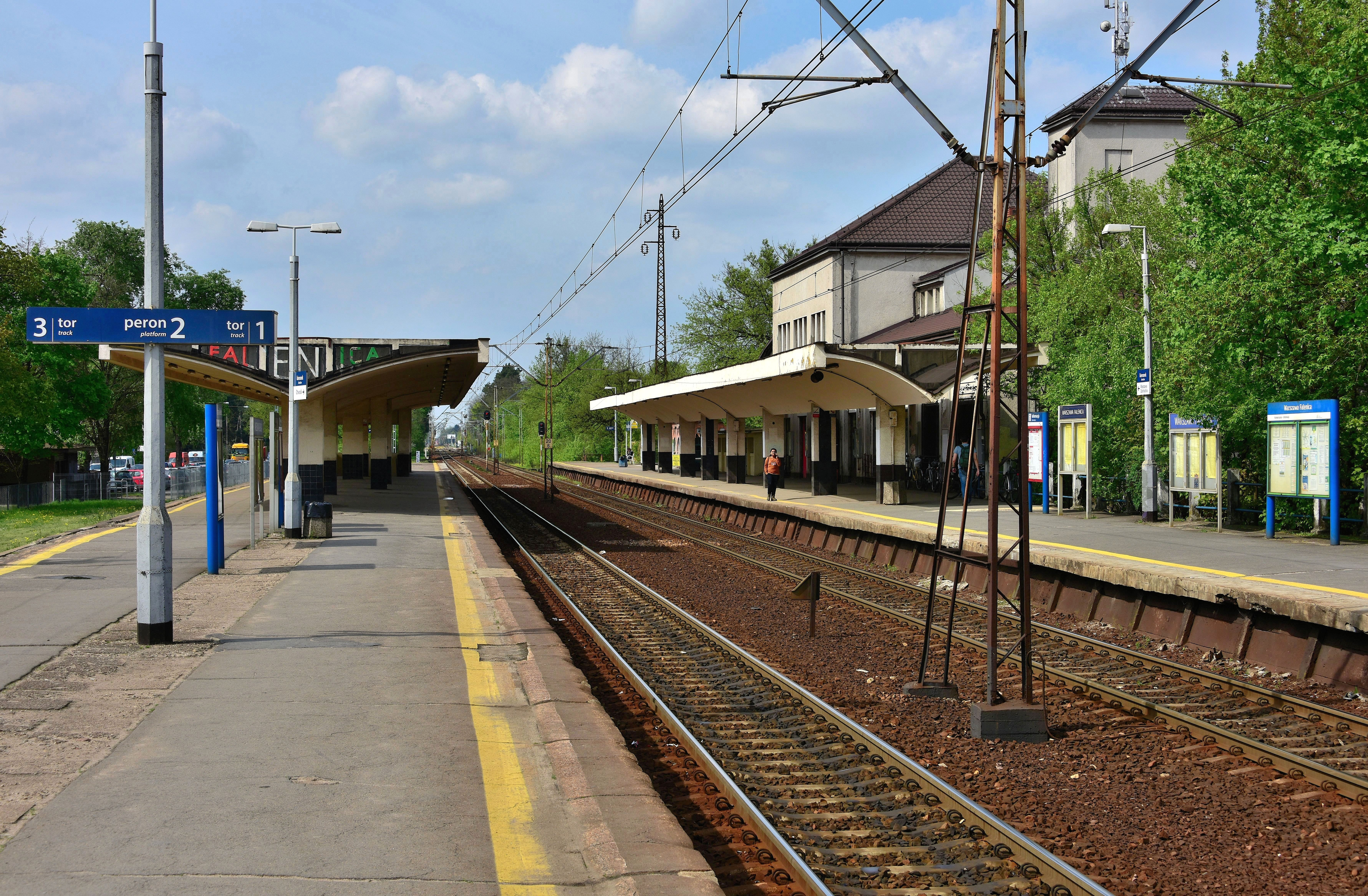

General information
- Location: Wawer, Warsaw, Masovian; Poland
- Coordinates: 52°09′43″N 21°12′40″E
- Owner: Polskie Koleje Państwowe S.A.
- Platforms: 2
- Tracks: 3

Services
Preceding station	Masovian Railways	Following station
Warszawa Miedzeszyn towards Warszawa Zachodnia	R7	Michalin towards Dęblin
Preceding station	SKM Warsaw	Following station
Warszawa Miedzeszyn towards Pruszków	S1	Michalin towards Otwock
Warszawa Miedzeszyn towards Warszawa Wschodnia	S10	Michalin towards Otwock
Location
- Warszawa Falenica located on the Warsaw Railway Junction

Warszawa Falenica railway station is a railway station in the Wawer district of Warsaw, Poland. As of 2012, it is served by Masovian Railways, who run the KM7 services from Warszawa Zachodnia to Dęblin and by Rapid Urban Railway (Warsaw), who run the S1 services from Pruszków PKP to Otwock.

As of 2026 the current station is under extensive refurbishment with a temporary station located nearby
