= Warszawa Międzylesie railway station =

Railway station in Warsaw, Poland

Warszawa Międzylesie
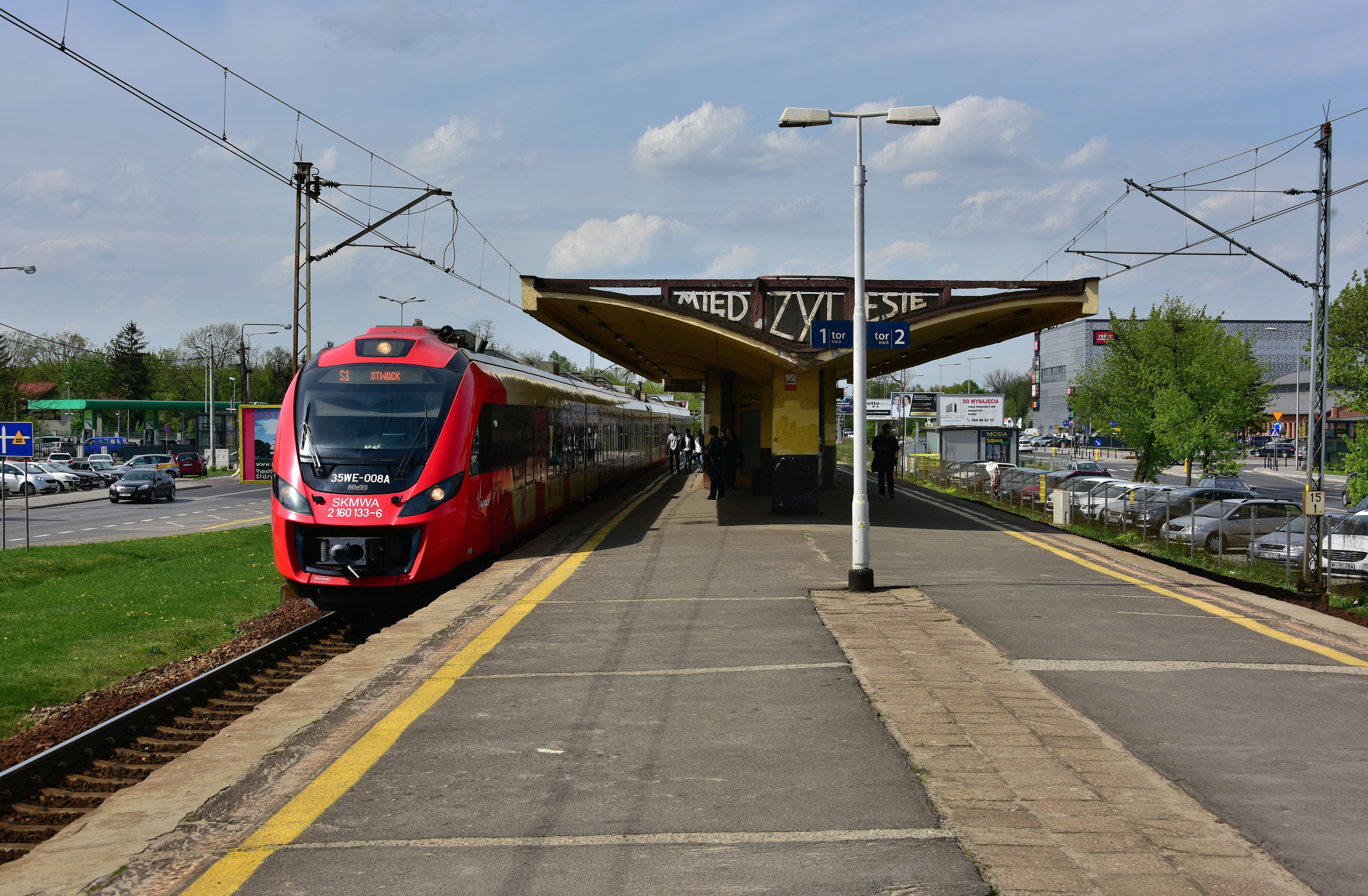

General information
- Location: Wawer, Warsaw, Masovian; Poland
- Coordinates: 52°12′14″N 21°10′09″E
- Owner: Polskie Koleje Państwowe S.A.
- Platforms: 1
- Tracks: 2

Services
| Preceding station | Masovian Railways | Following station |
|---|---|---|
| Warszawa Anin towards Warszawa Zachodnia | R7 | Warszawa Radość towards Dęblin |
| Preceding station | SKM Warsaw | Following station |
| Warszawa Anin towards Pruszków | S1 | Warszawa Radość towards Otwock |
| Warszawa Anin towards Warszawa Wschodnia | S10 | Warszawa Radość towards Otwock |
Location
- Warszawa Międzylesie located on the Warsaw Railway Junction

Warszawa Międzylesie railway station is a railway station in the Wawer district of Warsaw, Poland. As of 2012, it is served by Masovian Railways, who run the KM7 services from Warszawa Zachodnia to Dęblin and by Rapid Urban Railway (Warsaw), who run the S1 services from Pruszków PKP to Otwock.
