= Warszawa Gocławek railway station =

Railway station in Warsaw, Poland

Warszawa Gocławek
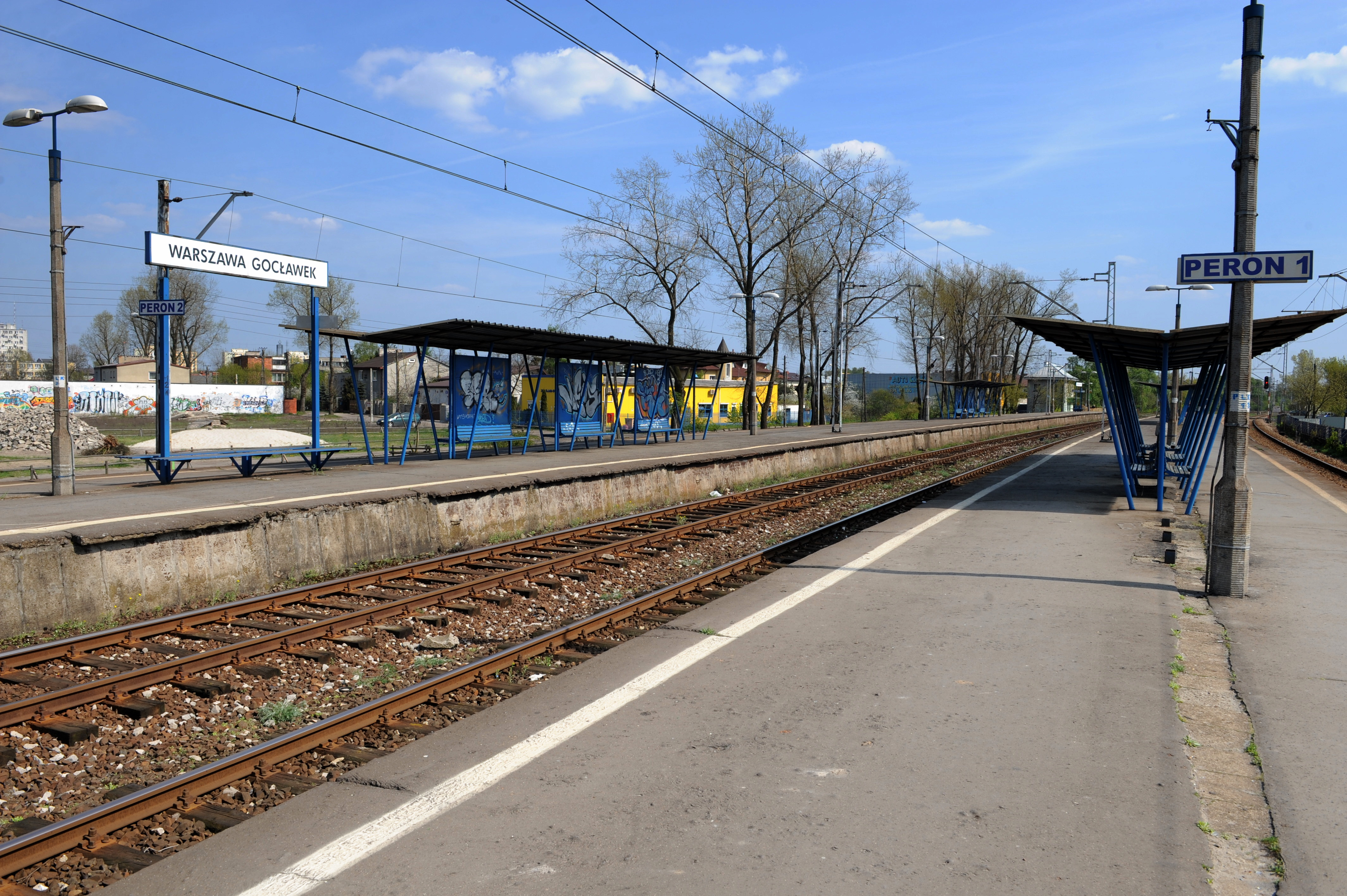

General information
- Location: Wawer, Warsaw, Masovian; Poland
- Coordinates: 52°14′13″N 21°08′07″E
- Owner: Polskie Koleje Państwowe S.A.
- Platforms: 2
- Tracks: 4

Services
Preceding station	Masovian Railways	Following station
Warszawa Olszynka Grochowska towards Warszawa Zachodnia	R7	Warszawa Wawer towards Dęblin
Preceding station	SKM Warsaw	Following station
Warszawa Wschodnia towards Pruszków	S1	Warszawa Wawer towards Otwock
Warszawa Wschodnia Terminus	S10	Warszawa Wawer towards Otwock
Location
- Warszawa Gocławek located on the Warsaw Railway Junction

Warszawa Gocławek railway station is a railway station in the Wawer district of Warsaw, Poland. As of 2012, it is served by Masovian Railways, who run the KM7 services from Warszawa Zachodnia to Dęblin and by Rapid Urban Railway (Warsaw), who run the S1 services from Pruszków PKP to Otwock.
