= Warszawa Miedzeszyn railway station =

Railway station in Warsaw, Poland

Warszawa Miedzeszyn
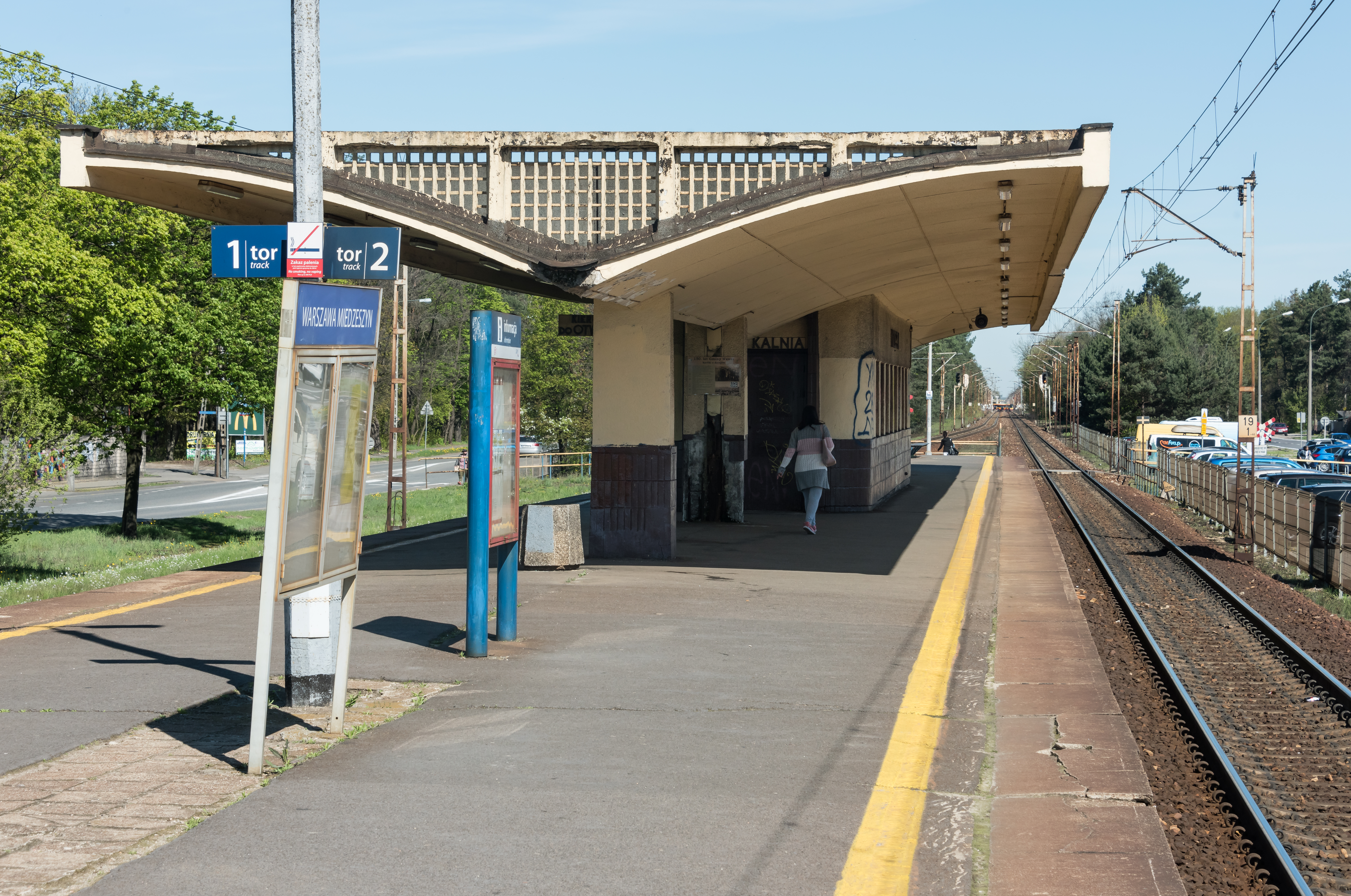

General information
- Location: Wawer, Warsaw, Masovian; Poland
- Coordinates: 52°10′21″N 21°12′02″E
- Owner: Polskie Koleje Państwowe S.A.
- Platforms: 1
- Tracks: 2

Services
Preceding station	Masovian Railways	Following station
Warszawa Radość towards Warszawa Zachodnia	R7	Warszawa Falenica towards Dęblin
Preceding station	SKM Warsaw	Following station
Warszawa Radość towards Pruszków	S1	Warszawa Falenica towards Otwock
Warszawa Radość towards Warszawa Wschodnia	S10	Warszawa Falenica towards Otwock
Location
- Warszawa Miedzeszyn located on the Warsaw Railway Junction

Warszawa Miedzeszyn railway station is a railway station in the Wawer district of Warsaw, Poland. As of 2012, it is served by Masovian Railways, who run the KM7 services from Warszawa Zachodnia to Dęblin and by Rapid Urban Railway (Warsaw), who run the S1 services from Pruszków PKP to Otwock.
