= Michalin railway station =

Railway station in Józefów, Poland

Michalin
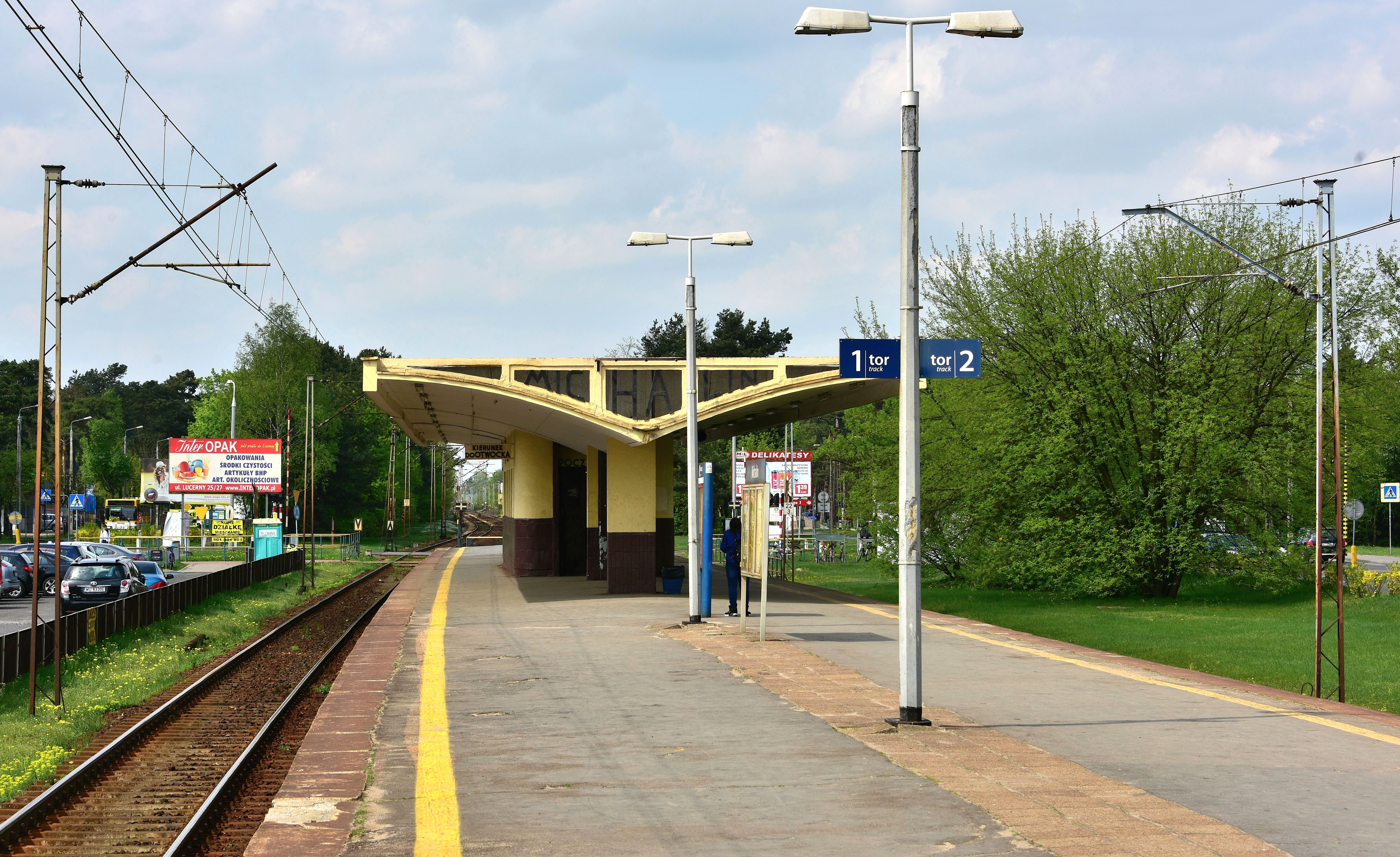

General information
- Location: Michalin, Józefów, Otwock, Masovian; Poland
- Coordinates: 52.1485988°N 21.2246384°E
- System: Rail Station
- Owner: Polskie Koleje Państwowe S.A.

Services
Preceding station	Masovian Railways	Following station
Warszawa Miedzeszyn towards Warszawa Zachodnia	R7	Józefów towards Dęblin
Preceding station	SKM Warsaw	Following station
Warszawa Falenica towards Pruszków	S1	Józefów towards Otwock
Warszawa Falenica towards Warszawa Wschodnia	S10	Józefów towards Otwock
Location

Michalin railway station is a railway station at Michalin, Józefów, Otwock, Masovian, Poland. It is served by Masovian Railways.
