= Warszawa Anin railway station =

Railway station in Warsaw, Poland

Warszawa Anin
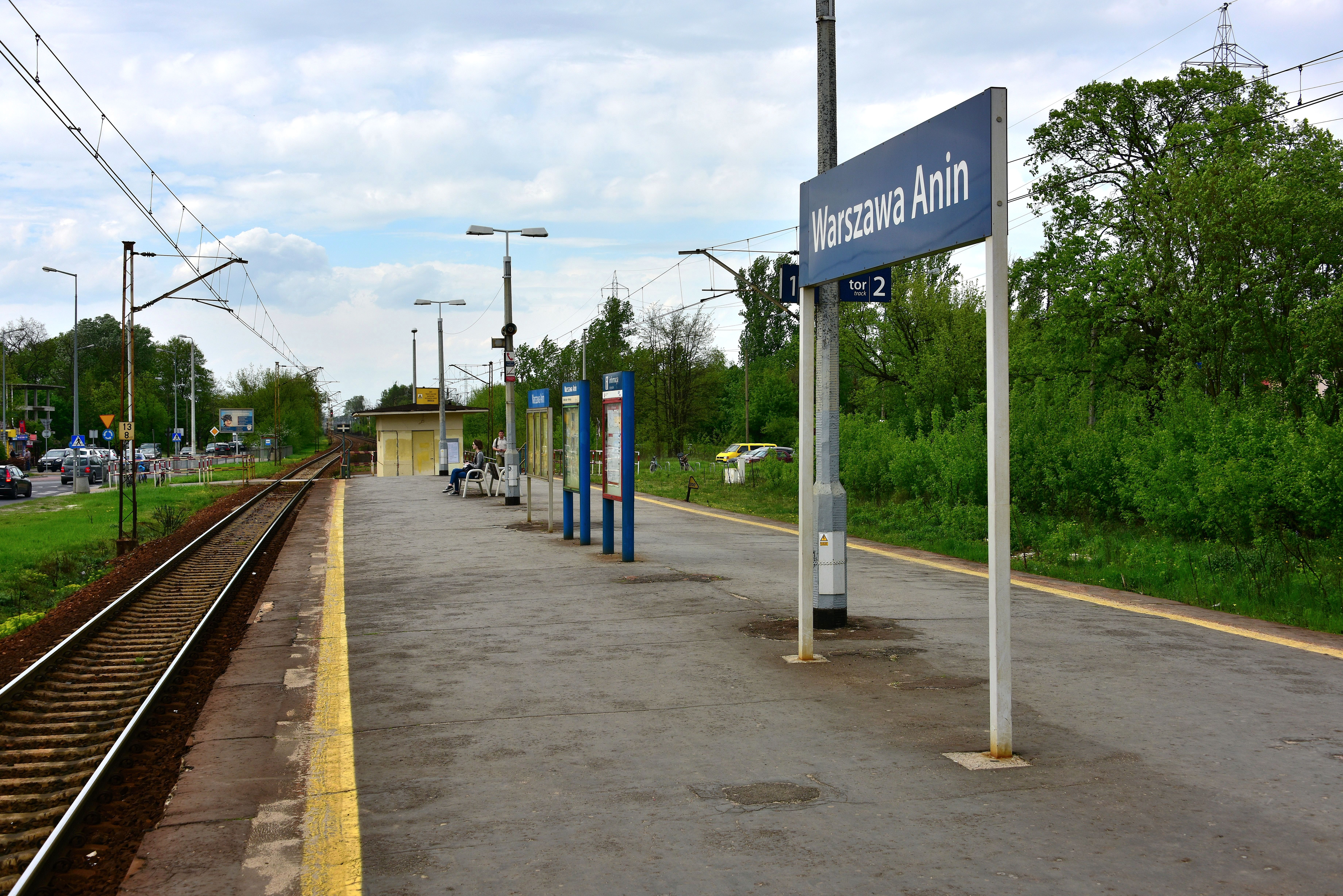

General information
- Location: Wawer, Warsaw, Masovian; Poland
- Coordinates: 52°12′49″N 21°09′33″E
- Owner: Polskie Koleje Państwowe S.A.
- Platforms: 1
- Tracks: 2

Services
Preceding station	Masovian Railways	Following station
Warszawa Wawer towards Warszawa Zachodnia	R7	Warszawa Międzylesie towards Dęblin
Preceding station	SKM Warsaw	Following station
Warszawa Wawer towards Pruszków	S1	Warszawa Międzylesie towards Otwock
Warszawa Wawer towards Warszawa Wschodnia	S10	Warszawa Międzylesie towards Otwock
Location
- Warszawa Anin located on the Warsaw Railway Junction

Warszawa Anin railway station is a railway station in the Wawer district of Warsaw, Poland. As of 2012, it is served by Masovian Railways, who run the KM7 services from Warszawa Zachodnia to Dęblin and by Rapid Urban Railway (Warsaw), who run the S1 services from Pruszków PKP to Otwock.
