= Józefów railway station =

Railway station in Józefów, Poland

Józefów
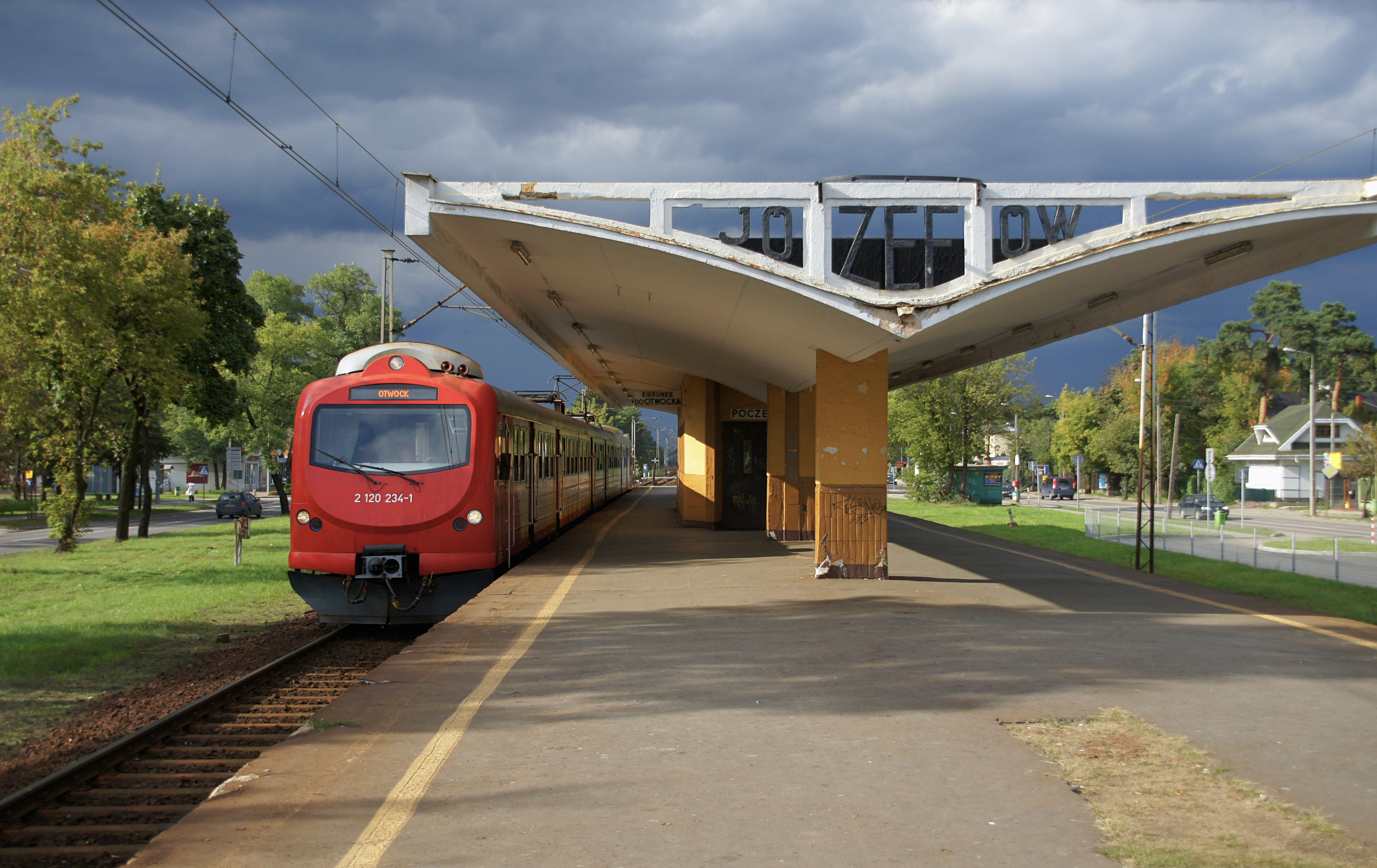

General information
- Location: Józefów, Otwock, Masovian; Poland
- Coordinates: 52.136083°N 21.2368411°E
- System: Rail Station
- Owner: Polskie Koleje Państwowe S.A.

Services
| Preceding station | Masovian Railways | Following station |
|---|---|---|
| Michalin towards Warszawa Zachodnia | R7 | Otwock Świder towards Dęblin |
| Preceding station | SKM Warsaw | Following station |
| Michalin towards Pruszków | S1 | Otwock Świder towards Otwock |
| Michalin towards Warszawa Wschodnia | S10 | Otwock Świder towards Otwock |
Location

Józefów railway station is a railway station at Józefów, Otwock, Masovian, Poland. It is served by Masovian Railways and SKM Warszawa.
