= Warszawa Olszynka Grochowska railway station =

Railway station in Warsaw, Poland

Warszawa Olszynka Grochowska
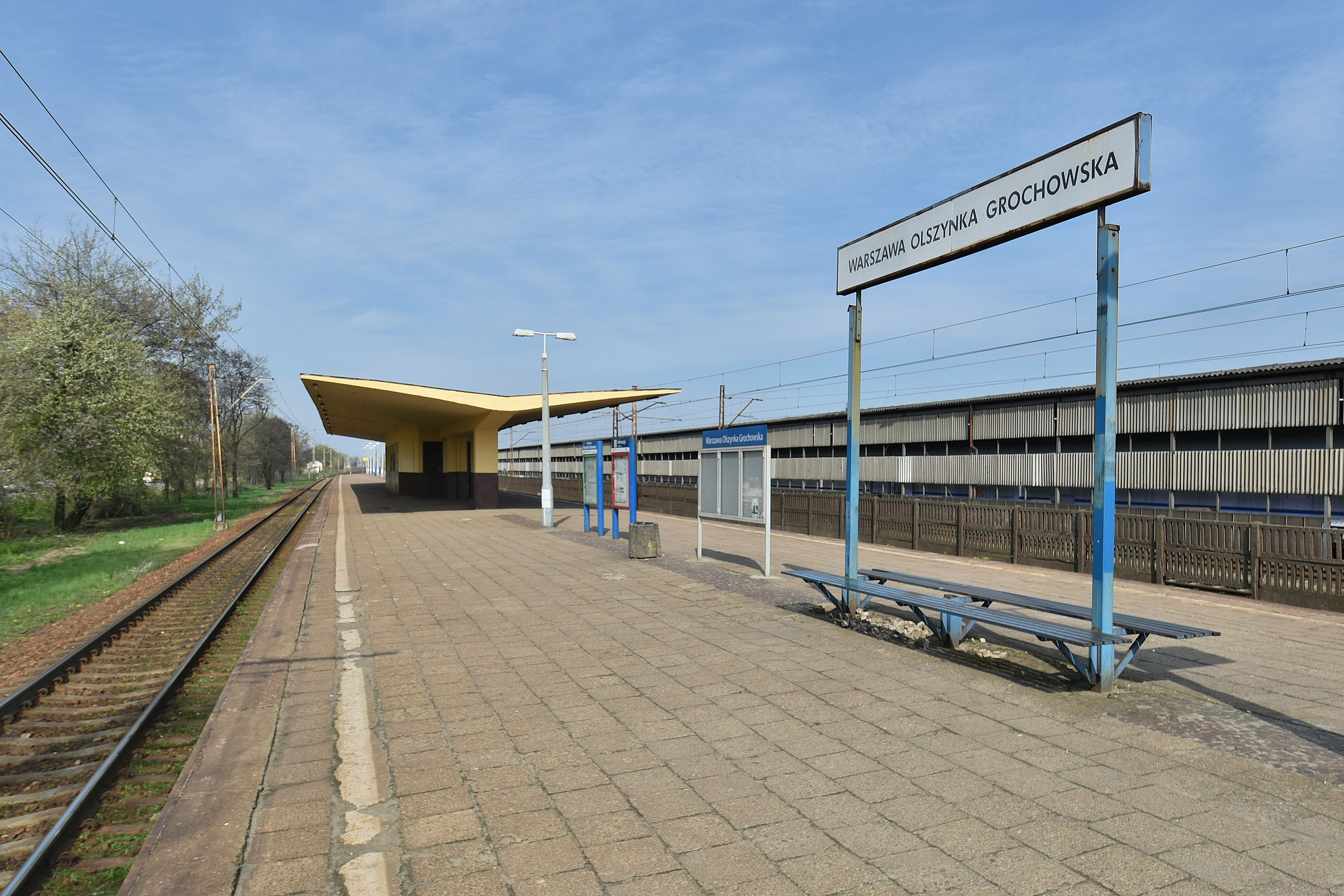

General information
- Location: Praga Południe, Warsaw, Masovian; Poland
- Coordinates: 52°14′59″N 21°06′25″E
- Owner: Polskie Koleje Państwowe S.A.
- Platforms: 1
- Tracks: 2

Services
Preceding station	Masovian Railways	Following station
Warszawa Wschodnia towards Warszawa Zachodnia	R7	Warszawa Gocławek towards Dęblin
Location
- Warszawa Olszynka Grochowska located on the Warsaw Railway Junction

Warszawa Olszynka Grochowska railway station is a railway station in the Praga Południe district of Warsaw, Poland. As of 2012, it is served by Masovian Railways, who run the KM7 services from Warszawa Zachodnia to Dęblin and by Rapid Urban Railway (Warsaw), who run the S1 services from Pruszków PKP to Otwock.
