= Otwock Świder railway station =

Railway stop in Otwock, Poland

Otwock Świder
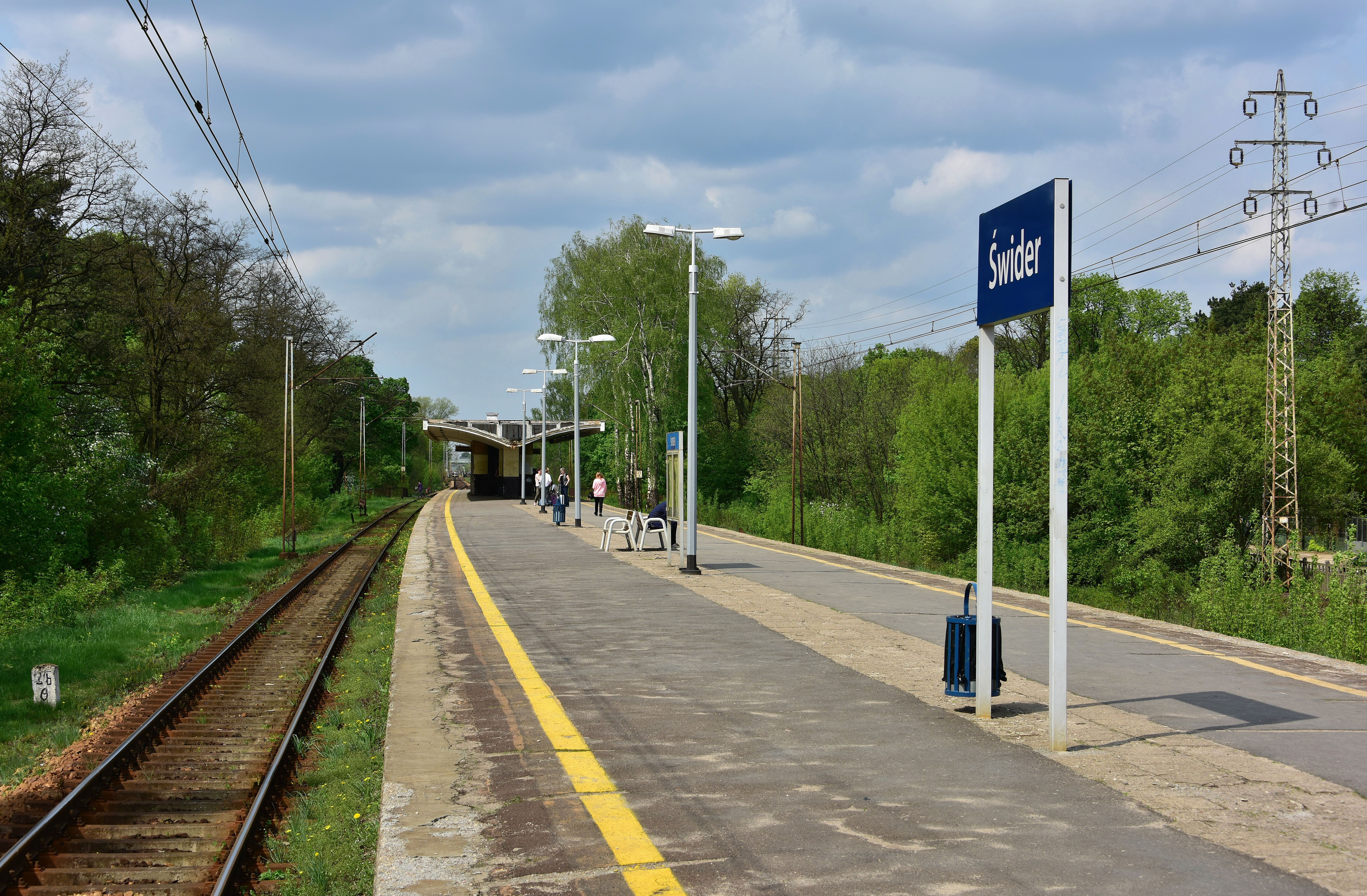

General information
- Location: Świder, Otwock, Otwock, Masovian; Poland
- Coordinates: 52.1213°N 21.2513°E
- System: Rail Station
- Owner: Polskie Koleje Państwowe S.A.

Services
| Preceding station | Masovian Railways | Following station |
|---|---|---|
| Józefów towards Warszawa Zachodnia | R7 | Otwock towards Dęblin |
| Preceding station | SKM Warsaw | Following station |
| Józefów towards Pruszków | S1 | Otwock Terminus |
| Józefów towards Warszawa Wschodnia | S10 | Otwock Terminus |
Location

Otwock Świder is a railway station at Świder, Otwock, Otwock, Masovian, Poland. It is served by Masovian Railways and SKM Warszawa.
