= Sadul =

Neighbourhood of Warsaw, Poland

- Municipal neighbourhood and City Information System area
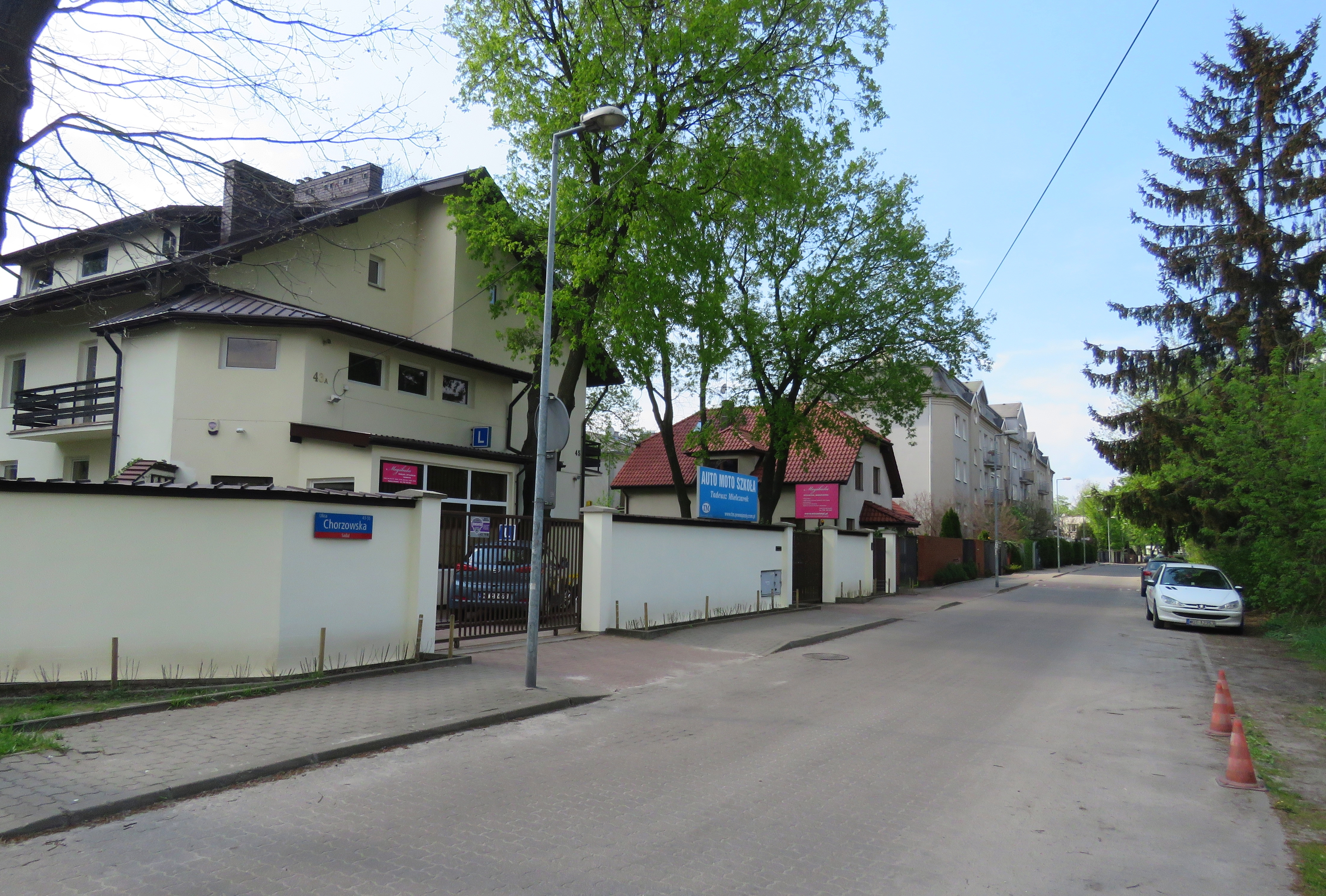
- Chorzowska Street in Sadul, in 2017.
- Interactive map of Sadul
- Coordinates: 52°12′33″N 21°09′45″E
- Country: Poland
- Voivodeship: Masovian
- City county: Warsaw
- District: Wawer
- Seat: 110 Lucerny Street, Warsaw
- Time zone: UTC+1 (CET)
  - Summer (DST): UTC+2 (CEST)
- Area code: +48 22

Sadul is a municipal neighbourhood, and an area of the City Information System, in the city of Warsaw, Poland, located within the district of Wawer.

The settlement of Sadul was established in 1836, by being separated from the nearby settlement of Zastów. It was incorporated into the city of Warsaw in 1951.

== History ==
Sadul was established in 1836, when it was separated from the settlement of Zastów. Upon its creation, it was leased by Aleksander Stanisław Potocki, owner of Zastów, to Stanisław Łapiński.

In 1909, within current boundaries of the City Information System area of Sadul, was established the holiday village of Anin, which, between 1934 and 1939, had developed into a luxury residential neighborhood. Currently, within the eastern portion of Sadul, is located the neighbourhood of Old Anin.

In 1921, in Sadul was located one household, and the settlement had 5 inhabitants.

From 1867 to 1933, Sadul belonged to the gmina (municipality) of Wawer. On 9 December 1933, the settlement was transferred to the gmina of Zagóźdź. On 1 April 1939, the municipality was disestablished, and Sadul was incorporated back into gmina of Wawer.

On 15 May 1951, Sadul, together with the rest of the territory of gmina of Wawer, was incorporated into the city of Warsaw.

On 18 October 2004, the district of Wawer was divided into areas of the City Information System, with Sadul becoming one of them.

== Public transit ==
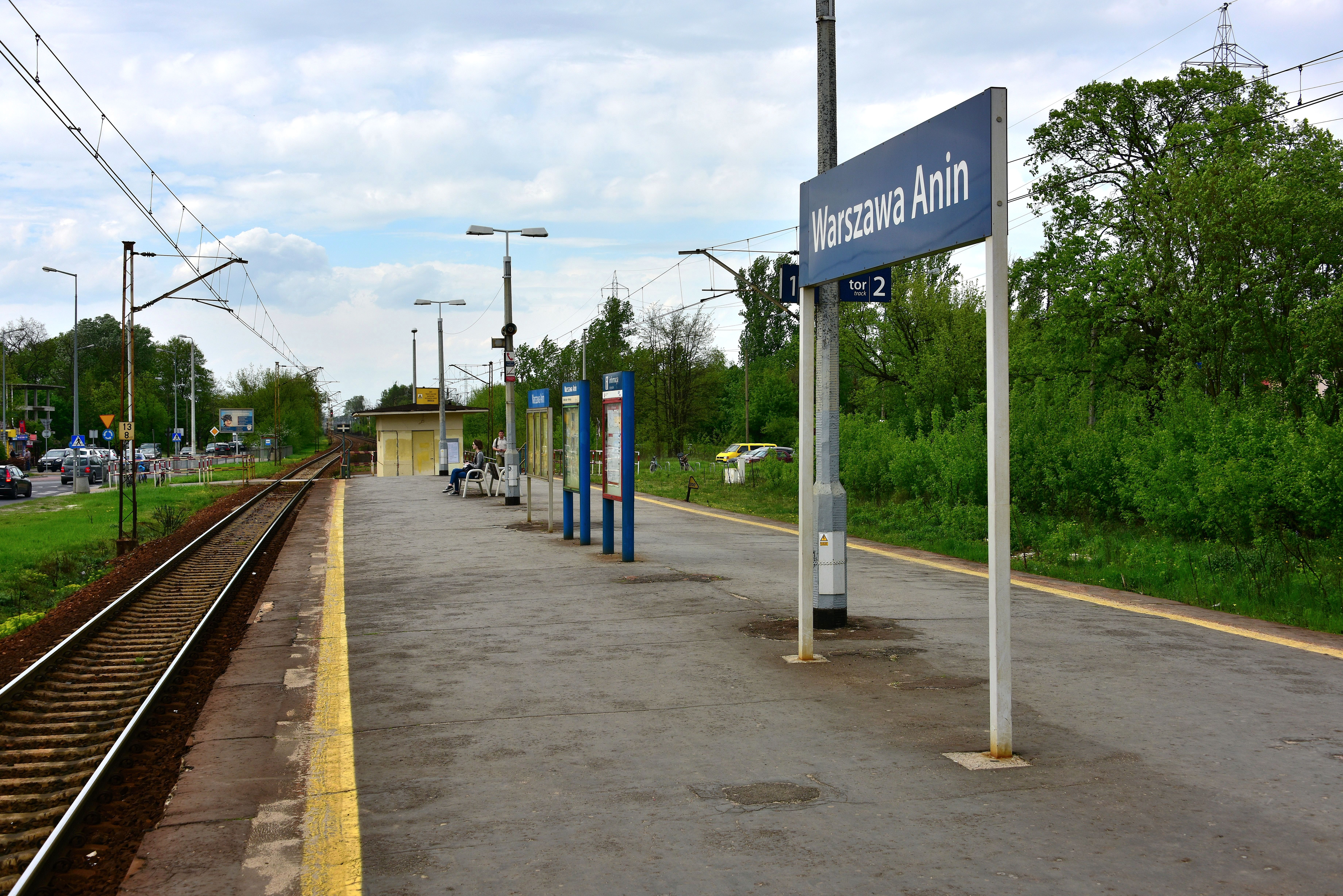
The Warszawa Anin railway station, located in Sadul, in 2018.

In Sadul is located the Warszawa Anin railway station, operated by the Polish State Railways. The station has one platform, and is located at the railway line no. 7.

== Location and administrative boundaries ==
Sadul is located in the city of Warsaw, Poland, within the north-central portion of the district of Wawer. It is a City Information System area. To the north, its border determined by Lucerny Street; to the east, by the railway line no. 7; to the south, by the overhead power lines coming from the Siekierki Power Station; and to the west, by the Zagóźdź Canal, and Nowe Ujście Canal.

It borders Wawer to the north, Anin to the east, Międzylesie to the south, and Zerzeń to the west.

== Municipal neighbourhood ==
Sadul is one of municipal neighbourhoods of the district of Wawer, with its boundaries being identical to the boundaries of the City Information System area of Sadul. It is administrated by the neighbourhood council, which seat of government is located at 110 Lucerny Street.
