= Warszawa Wesoła railway station =

Railway station in Warsaw, Poland

Warszawa Wesoła
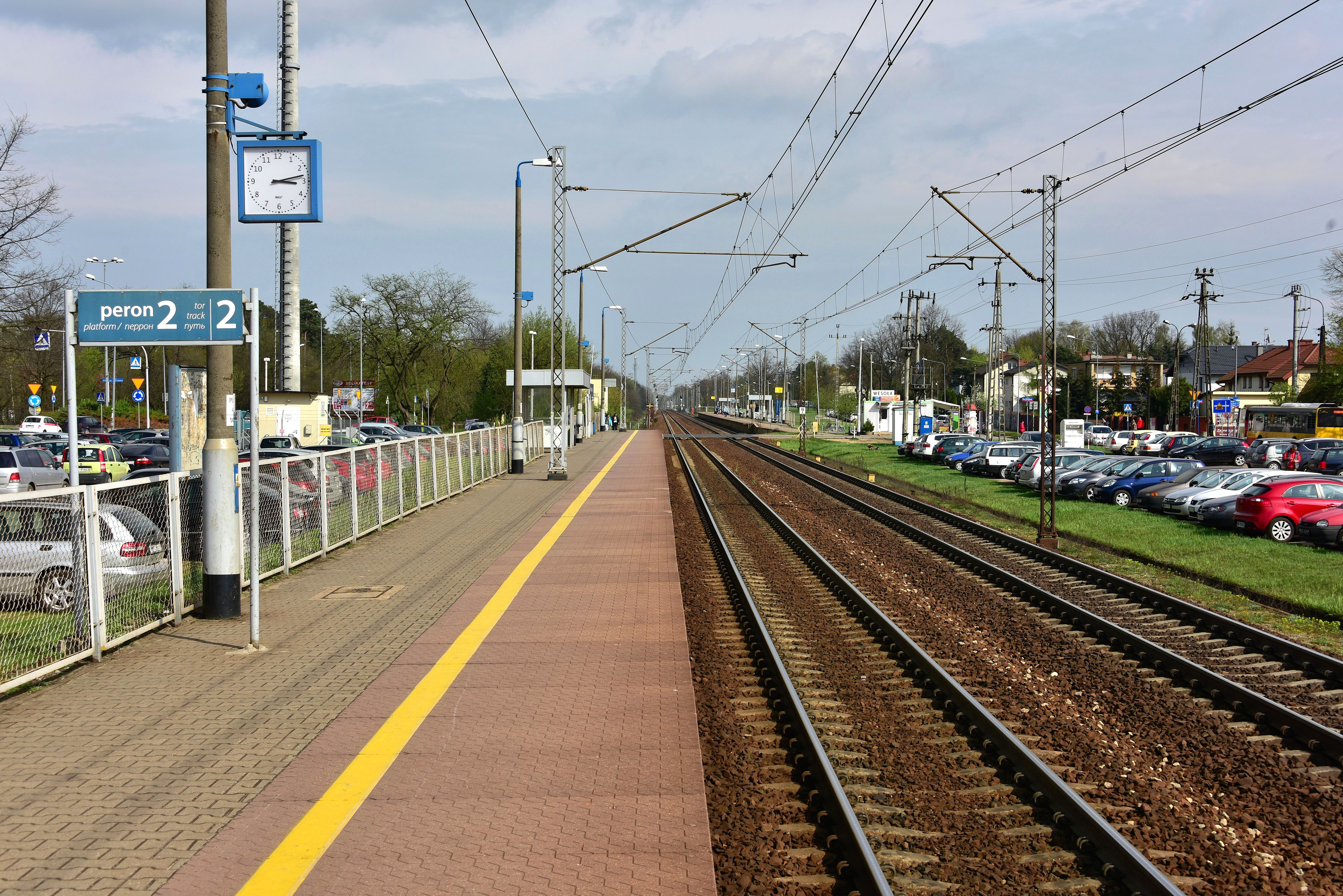

General information
- Location: Wesoła, Warsaw, Masovian; Poland
- Coordinates: 52°15′14″N 21°13′26″E
- Owner: Polskie Koleje Państwowe S.A.
- Platforms: 2
- Tracks: 2

History
- Former names: Wesoła

Services
Preceding station	Masovian Railways	Following station
Warszawa Rembertów towards Warszawa Zachodnia	R2	Warszawa Wola Grzybowska towards Łuków
Preceding station	SKM Warsaw	Following station
Warszawa Rembertów towards Warsaw Chopin Airport	S2	Warszawa Wola Grzybowska towards Sulejówek Miłosna
Warszawa Rembertów towards Warszawa Wschodnia	S20	Warszawa Wola Grzybowska towards Sulejówek Miłosna
Location
- Warszawa Wesoła located on the Warsaw Railway Junction

Warszawa Wesoła railway station is a railway station in the Wesoła district of Warsaw, Poland. As of 2011, it is served by Masovian Railways, who run the KM2 services from Warszawa Zachodnia to Łuków and by Rapid Urban Railway (Warsaw), who run the S2 services from Warszawa Zachodnia to Sulejówek Miłosna.
