= Warszawa Wola Grzybowska railway station =

Railway station in Warsaw, Poland

Warszawa Wola Grzybowska
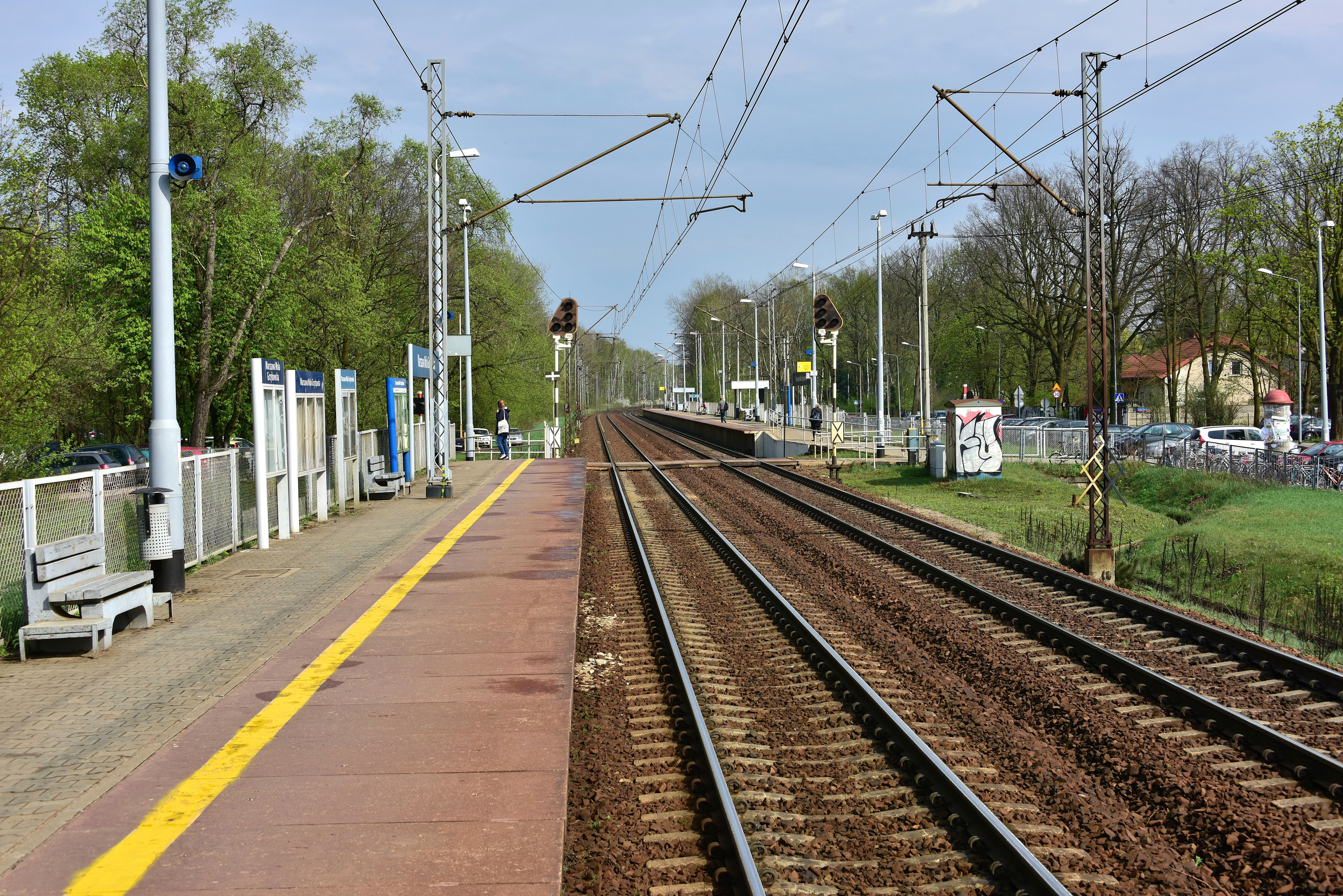

General information
- Location: Wesoła, Warsaw, Masovian; Poland
- Coordinates: 52°15′10″N 21°15′03″E
- Owner: Polskie Koleje Państwowe S.A.
- Platforms: 2
- Tracks: 2

History
- Former names: Wola Grzybowska

Services
Preceding station	Masovian Railways	Following station
Warszawa Wesoła towards Warszawa Zachodnia	R2	Sulejówek towards Łuków
Preceding station	SKM Warsaw	Following station
Warszawa Wesoła towards Warsaw Chopin Airport	S2	Sulejówek towards Sulejówek Miłosna
Warszawa Wesoła towards Warszawa Wschodnia	S20	Sulejówek towards Sulejówek Miłosna
Location
- Warszawa Wola Grzybowska located on the Warsaw Railway Junction

Warszawa Wola Grzybowska railway station is a railway station in the Wesoła district of Warsaw, Poland. As of 2012, it is served by Masovian Railways, who run the KM2 services from Warszawa Zachodnia to Łuków and by Rapid Urban Railway (Warsaw), who run the S2 services from Warszawa Zachodnia to Sulejówek Miłosna.
