= Warszawa Rembertów railway station =

Railway station in Warsaw, Poland

Warszawa Rembertów
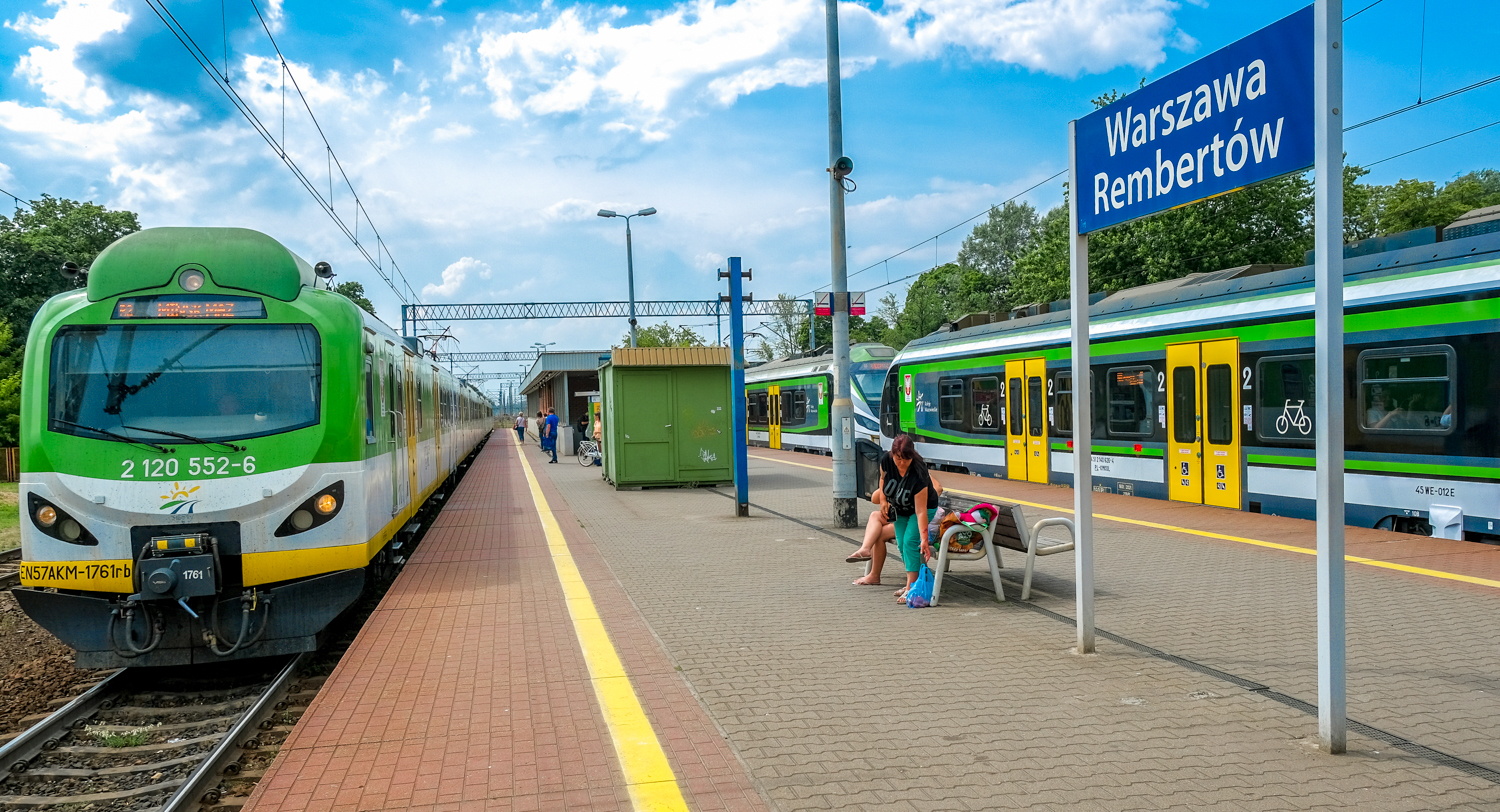

General information
- Location: Rembertów, Warsaw, Masovian; Poland
- Coordinates: 52°15′25″N 21°09′28″E
- Owner: Polskie Koleje Państwowe S.A.
- Platforms: 1
- Tracks: 2

Construction
- Structure type: Building: No

History
- Opened: 1866

Services
Preceding station	Masovian Railways	Following station
Warszawa Wschodnia towards Warszawa Zachodnia	R2	Warszawa Wesoła towards Łuków
Warszawa Wschodnia towards Warszawa Zachodnia	R6	Zielonka Bankowa towards Czyżew
Preceding station	SKM Warsaw	Following station
Warszawa Wschodnia towards Warsaw Chopin Airport	S2	Warszawa Wesoła towards Sulejówek Miłosna
Warszawa Wschodnia Terminus	S20	Warszawa Wesoła towards Sulejówek Miłosna
Location
- Warszawa Rembertów located on the Warsaw Railway Junction

Warszawa Rembertów railway station is a railway station in the Rembertów district of Warsaw, Poland. As of 2011, it is served by Masovian Railways, who run the KM2 and KM6 services from Warszawa Zachodnia to Łuków and Małkinia respectively and by Rapid Urban Railway (Warsaw), who run the S2 services from Warszawa Zachodnia to Sulejówek Miłosna.
