= Wawer massacre =

Massacre of Poles by German Nazis (1939)

Coordinates: 52°14′02″N 21°09′33″E

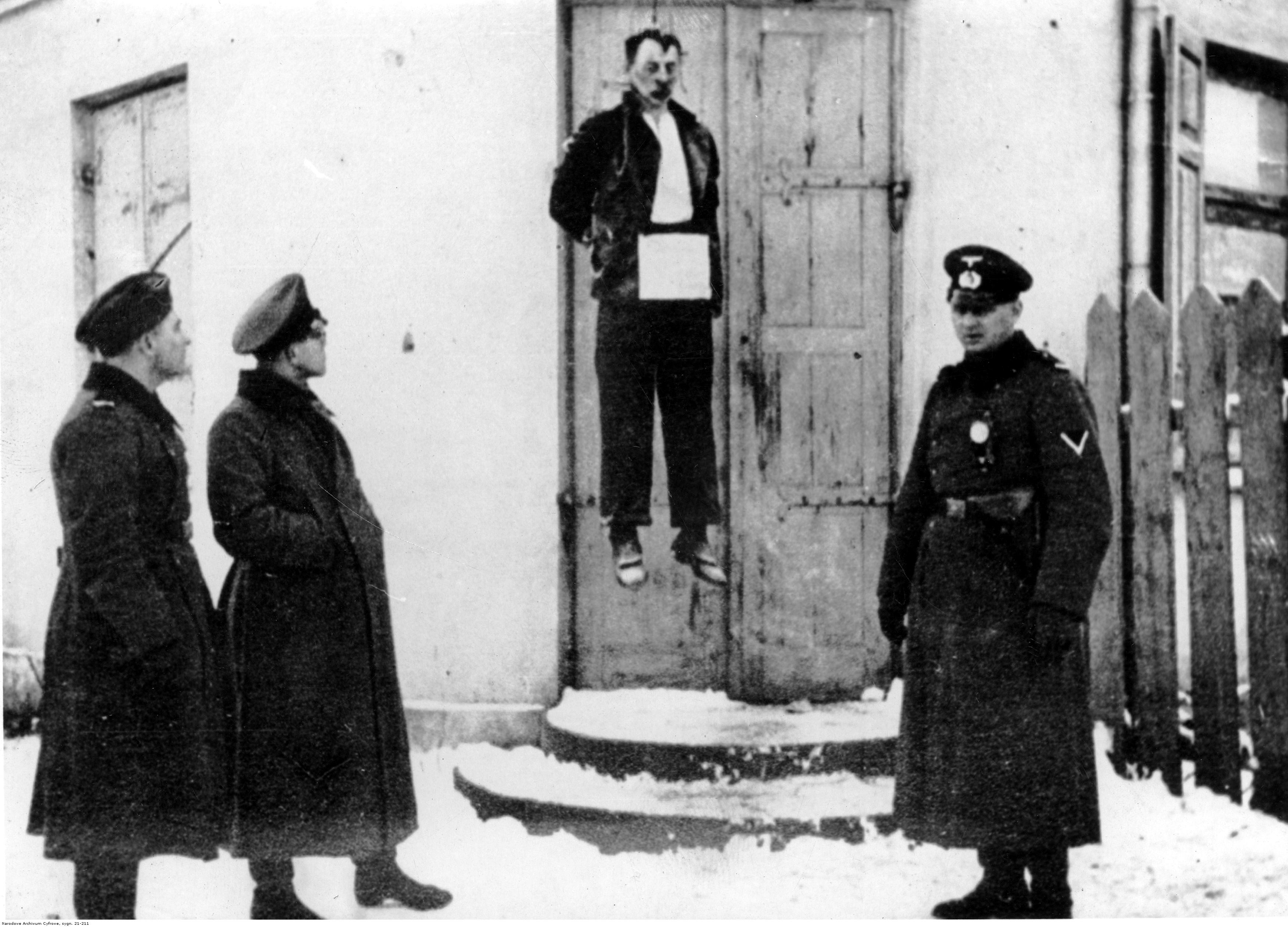
Antoni Bartoszek hanged by the Germans near the entrance to his restaurant at Wawer 27 December 1939

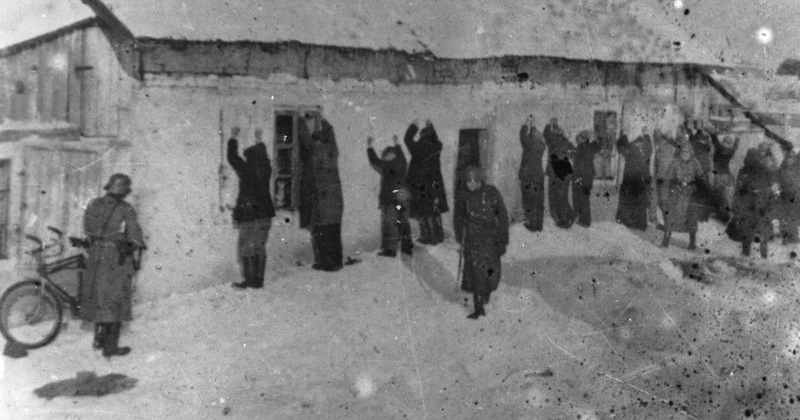
Massacre in Wawer 1939

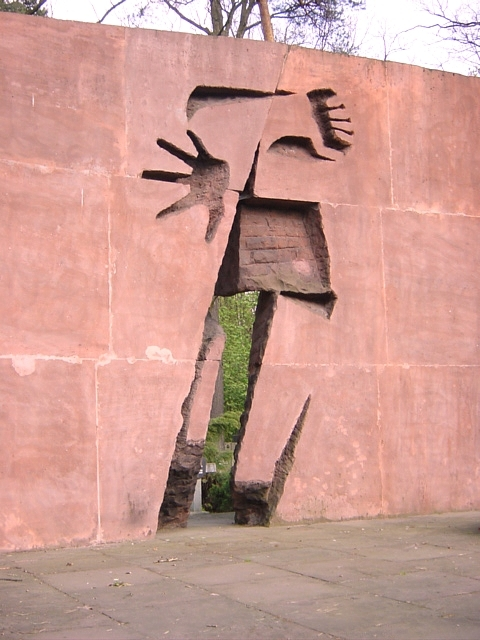
The War Cemetery commemorating 107 victims of the Wawer massacre, committed by German police in German-occupied Poland on 27 December 1939 in Warsaw

The Wawer massacre refers to the execution of 107 Polish civilians on the night of 26 to 27 December 1939 by the German occupiers of Wawer (at the time a suburb and currently a neighbourhood of Warsaw), Poland. The execution was a response to the killing of two German soldiers in a shootout by two petty criminals. An order to arrest at random any men inhabiting Wawer and the neighboring Anin between the ages of 16 and 70 was given and, as a result, 120 men, who were unrelated to the shootout, were gathered, and a show trial was hastily organized. 114 were declared "guilty" and sentenced to death, the others were spared to bury the dead. In total, 107 were killed and 7 survived, as they withstood the gunfire and were not finished off later.

It is considered to be one of the first large scale massacres of Polish civilians by Nazi Germany in occupied Poland.

== Background ==
Nazi Germany invaded and occupied Poland in September 1939. From the start, the war against Poland was intended to be the fulfilment of a plan described by Adolf Hitler in his book Mein Kampf. The main gist of the plan was for all of Eastern Europe to become part of a Greater Germany, the German Lebensraum ("living space").

On the evening of 26 December, two known Polish criminals, Marian Prasuła and Stanisław Dąbek, killed two German non-commissioned officers from Baubataillon 538. After learning of it, the acting commander of the Ordnungspolizei in Warsaw, colonel Max Daume ordered an immediate reprisal, consisting of a series of arrests of random Polish males, aged 16 to 70, found in the region where the killings occurred (in Wawer and the neighboring Anin villages).

== Massacre ==
After a kangaroo court presided over by Major General Friedrich Wilhelm Wenzel, 114 of the 120 people arrested - who had no knowledge of the recent killings, many of whom were roused from their beds - were sentenced to death. They were not given the opportunity to plead their case. Of the 114, one managed to escape, 7 were shot but not killed and managed to escape later, and 107 were shot dead. The dead included one professional military officer, one journalist, two Polish-American citizens and a 12-year-old boy. 34 victims were under the age of 18. Both Jews and Christians were massacred along with some Russians. Some of the executed were not locals, but merely visiting their families for Christmas.

== Aftermath ==
It was one of the earliest massacres (probably the second, after the Bochnia massacre of 52 civilians on December 18) to occur in occupied Poland. It was also one of the first instances of the large scale implementation by Germany of the doctrine of collective responsibility in the General Government in Poland since the end of the invasion in September.

Kotwica.

Soon after the massacre, a Polish youth resistance organization, "Wawer", was created. It was part of the Szare Szeregi (the underground Polish Scouting Association), and its first act was to create a series of graffiti in Warsaw around the Christmas of 1940, commemorating the massacre. Members of the AK Wawer "Small Sabotage" unit painted "Pomścimy Wawer" ("We'll avenge Wawer") on Warsaw walls. At first, they painted the whole text, then to save time they shortened it to two letters, P and W. Later they invented Kotwica - "Anchor" - the symbol, a combination of these 2 letters, was easy and fast to paint. Next kotwica gained more meanings - Polska Walcząca ("Fighting Poland"). It also stands for Wojsko Polskie ("Polish Army") and Powstanie Warszawskie ("Warsaw Uprising"). Finally "Kotwica" became a patriotic symbol of defiance against the occupiers and was painted on building walls everywhere.

On 3 March 1947, the Polish Supreme National Tribunal for the Trial of War Criminals (Najwyższy Trybunał Narodowy) sentenced Max Daume to death. Wilhelm Wenzel was extradited to Poland by the Soviets in 1950 and executed in November 1951.

There is now a monument in Wawer commemorating the massacre.

== See also ==
- List of massacres in Poland
- Chronicles of Terror
