= Las, Warsaw =

Polish subdistrict

Coordinates: 52.214832°N 21.118872°E

Las is a subdistrict of Wawer, in south-east Warsaw, with a population of over 2,500 inhabitants.

== History ==
The history of Las dates back to the 15th century (founded as a private noble village). Certain sources claim that in the 17th century, the village was owned by a Polish noble named Adam Kazanowski. In 1727, Las was incorporated into Dobra wilanowskie.

From 1864 to 1939, Las and the surrounding villages were part of the Zagóźdź commune. In 1939, Las became a part of Wawer.

During the Second World War, the area of Las was under German occupation. As part of Polish resistance forces, a squat of Peasants' Battalions operated in the area. During the Warsaw Uprising, Nazi forces captured 50 locals. Due to the ongoing offensive of the Red Army, local residents were forced to build fortifications. Subsequently, workers were sent to concentration camps located in today’s Austria (Mauthausen and Ebensee). By the end of the war, most buildings in Las were entirely destroyed.

After WWII, Las was rebuilt. In 1951, together with Wawer, Las became a part of Warsaw. In 1960, due to the liquidation of Wawer as a separate subunit, it was incorporated into Praga Południe. In 1994, when Wawer reappeared on the map of Warsaw as a commune, Las once again became its subdistrict.
