= Pilawa railway station =

Railway station in Pilawa, Poland

Pilawa
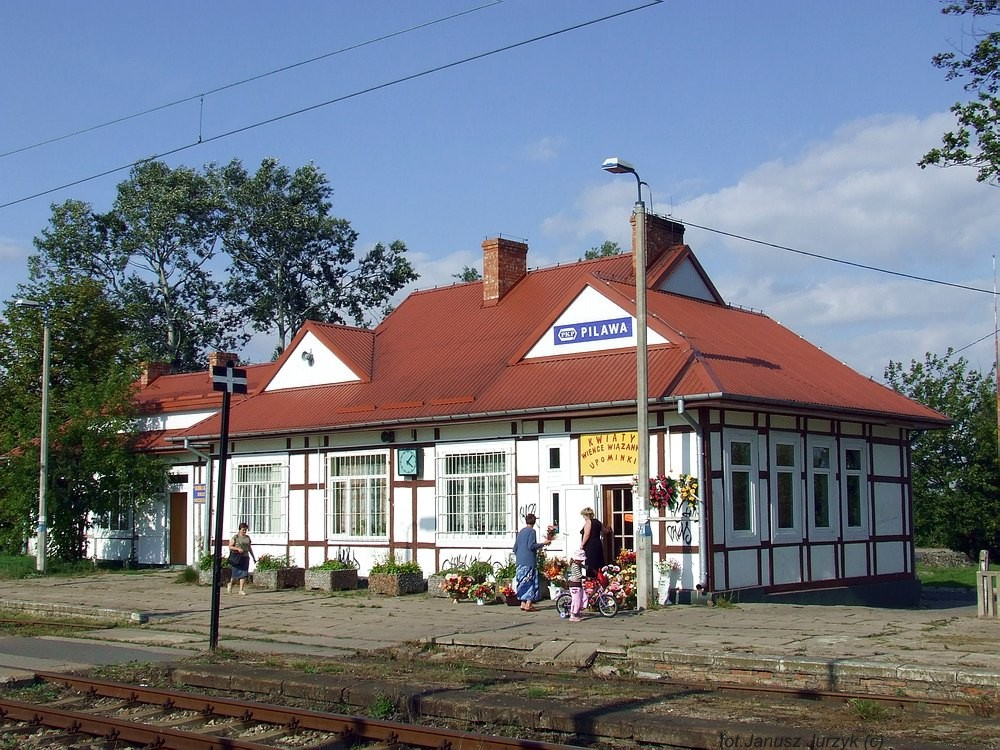

General information
- Location: Pilawa, Pilawa, Garwolin, Masovian; Poland
- Coordinates: 51.9556982°N 21.5346266°E
- System: Rail Station
- Owner: Polskie Koleje Państwowe S.A.

Services
Preceding station	PKP Intercity	Following station
Dęblin towards Lublin Główny	IC	Warszawa Wschodnia towards Łódź Fabryczna
Warszawa Gdańska towards Kołobrzeg	IC	Dęblin towards Hrubieszów Miasto
Otwock towards Kołobrzeg	TLK	Dęblin towards Kraków Główny
Preceding station	Masovian Railways	Following station
Augustówka towards Warszawa Zachodnia	R7	Garwolin towards Dęblin
Location

Pilawa railway station is a railway station at Pilawa, Garwolin, Masovian, Poland. It is served by Masovian Railways.

== Train services ==
The station is served by the following service(s):

- Intercity services (IC) Łódź Fabryczna — Warszawa — Lublin Główny
- Intercity services (IC) Kołobrzeg - Piła - Bydgoszcz - Warszawa - Lublin - Hrubieszów
- Intercity services (TLK) Kołobrzeg — Gdynia Główna — Warszawa Wschodnia — Kraków Główny
