= Wesoła =

Coordinates: 52°13′56.28″N 21°0′30.36″E

- Warsaw District
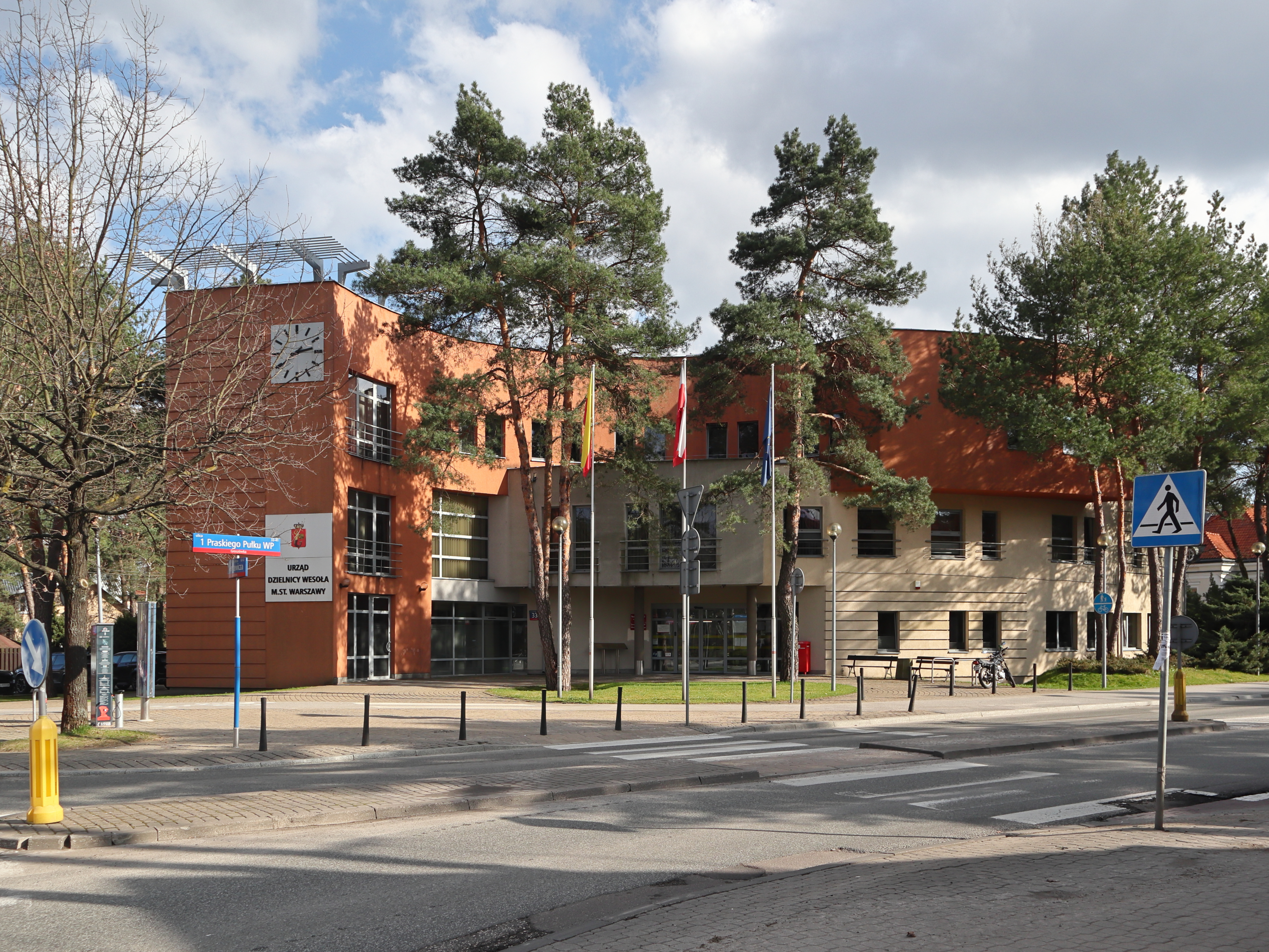
- Wesoła District Hall

- Coat of arms

- Location of Wesoła within Warsaw
- Country: Poland
- Voivodeship: Masovian
- County/City: Warsaw

Government
  - Mayor: Marian Mahor

Area
  - Total: 22.94 km^{2} (8.86 sq mi)

Population (2019)
  - Total: 25,439
  - Density: 1,109/km^{2} (2,872/sq mi)
- Time zone: UTC+1 (CET)
  - Summer (DST): UTC+2 (CEST)
- Area code: +48 22
- Website: wesola.um.warszawa.pl

Wesoła (Polish pronunciation: [vɛˈsɔwa]) is one of the districts of Warsaw, and has been as such since October 27, 2002. Wesoła is located in the south-eastern part of city.

Wesoła received town privileges on December 17, 1968. Then, the town included Wola Grzybowska, Wesoła, Groszówka, Grzybowa, Zielona and Stara Miłosna estates. The development of the area was determined by its proximity to three important routes.

The first route, called Stary Trakt (English: Old Route), comes from Grochów, then travels through Okuniew, Stanisławów, and finally through South Podlasie towards Russia. Established near this route was Grzybowa village with Zielona (English: Green) inn and Wola Grzybowa, which now is called Wola Grzybowska.

Near the second route, which comes from Praga, through Kamion, Grochowo, to Mińsk Mazowiecki, then through Terespol and Brest, the Miłosna village developed. In 1823 on the Stanisław Staszic's initiative a road was built, called Trakt Brzeski.

The third route was the Warsaw–Terespol Railway, started on September 18, 1867. It comes from Warsaw to Terespol, through Siedlce and Łuków.

Despite Warsaw growing and annexing new areas, there was no case where two streets shared the same name. The only exception is Wesoła, where many streets have the same name, for example with streets in Warsaw. It presents many difficulties, so addresses in Wesoła are given with a 'Wesoła' annotation.

== Wesoła's estates ==
=== Wola Grzybowska ===
In the beginning, Wola Grzybowska was a folwark and belonged to the Okuniew municipality. Legend about the name's origin says that the owner of the Wola Grzybowska was a Warsawian starost called Grzybowski. At least from the beginning of the 20th century it belonged to Duke Emanuel Bułhak. According to the 1931 census, there were 52 houses in Wola Grzybowska. During World War II Wola Grzybowska was seriously destroyed and later rebuilt. In 1968 it was annexed by Wesoła town. It is host to Warszawa Wola Grzybowska railway station.

=== Wesoła-Centrum ===
The territory Wesoła-Centrum, which now belongs to Wesoła estate, belonged to the Długa village land properties 500 years ago. In the 17th century it belonged to the Okuniew municipality. Colonization of these areas was related to the building of Kolej Terespolska. Then Wesoła was established as a loading platform for Russian army. After time, it has changed to a rail station (now Warszawa Wesoła railway station). Many houses were built in the area. In 1918 the estate adopted the Wesoła name. Later, the development was closely related to Warsaw. According to the 1937 census, there were 70 habitable buildings. At the end of the 1930s there was a stormy development of villas, due to the climate and virtue of the landscape.

=== Groszówka ===
The name derives from the low price of the land - 20 kopecks (popularly 1 grosz) for 1 ell. Sandy, thickly wooded hills weren't the best conditions to colonize these areas. However, now most of the streets remain forested avenues.

=== Grzybowa and Zielona ===
Grzybowa in the 17th century was a small settlement whose development was determined by the route from Grochów to Stanisławów. Near this track there was a Zielona inn. According to the 1827 census, in Grzybowa there were only three houses and twelve inhabitants. Around the inn, the village of Zielona started to develop.

In 1895 Zielona was a village in the Varsovian district, in the Okuniew municipality. Zielona's area was 245 morgas and it had 68 inhabitants. In 1795 Austria started to build a customs house there. It was a classical brick building destroyed in 1944. Grzybowa and Zielona were annexed to Wawer municipality. Currently there are beautiful estates located around the forests between the two parabolic dunes. On one of them is placed the Kamień Piłsudskiego (Piłsudski Stone), which commemorates the Polish Military Organisation's field exercises, which took place on April 29, 1917.

=== Stara Miłosna ===
Stara Miłosna is the oldest estate in Wesoła. Its documented history goes back to the 14th century. Stara Miłosna was the szlachta's village. Firstly, the name was Milosina, later Miłośnia, Miłośna and finally Miłosna. Through Miłosna runs a route, through which cattle was driven, and through which Warsaw was supplied. Many inns and 'mail' buildings were near the route. In the first half of 19th century, the owner of the majority of the area was prince Franciszek Ksawery Drucki-Lubecki, who was then chancellor of the exchequer. He had a palace there, which was destroyed during Battle of Olszynka Grochowska, in February 1831. After this, Miłosna was owned by the Rychłowski family. In the 19th and 20th centuries the Miłosna area got parcelled out. In the Słownik Geograficzny Królestwa Polskiego (English: Geographic Dictionary of Kingdom of Poland) it stated that in Miłosna was a few folwarks (Miłosna, Borków, Kaczydół and Żurawka), nomenclatures (Pohulanka, Janówek and Zakręt) and one village Zakręt.

During World War I, in 1915, German Army took over Russian linear defence, which ran on Miłosna's hill range. It was called Przedmoście Warszawy (English: Bridgehead of Warsaw, German: Bruckenkopf Warschau). During the Second Polish Republic the area was a prosperous town with summer resort estates, peat's health resort and an airport for gliders. Much was destroyed in World War II.

=== Polish Army Square ===
Until World War I, a large complex of barracks used by the Tsar's army was located near Stanisławów's old road. It was changed into a military training field in the Second Polish Republic's days. Dywizjon Artylerii Pomiarowej z Torunia (English: Artillery Measurement Detachment from Toruń) was stationed there, for which was built headquarters, an orchestra building and three accommodation buildings. Between 1949 and 1956 the unit's area became the headquarters of Centralny Ośrodek Szkolenia Informacji Wojskowej (English: Army's Information Training Centre) and was kept secret. From 1957 1. Pułk Piechoty 1. Dywizji Piechoty im. Tadeusza Kościuszki (English: 1st Infantry Regiment of 1st Tadeusz Kościuszko's Infantry Division) was based here for which a number of blocks were built including an amphitheatre, an allotment's garden Zachęta, a trade pavilion and 'Kościuszkowiec' Club. Today, the estate has 2000 inhabitants and is an open area.
