= Anin, Warsaw =

Coordinates: 52.218093°N 21.165601°E

Anin Anin
- Neighbourhood
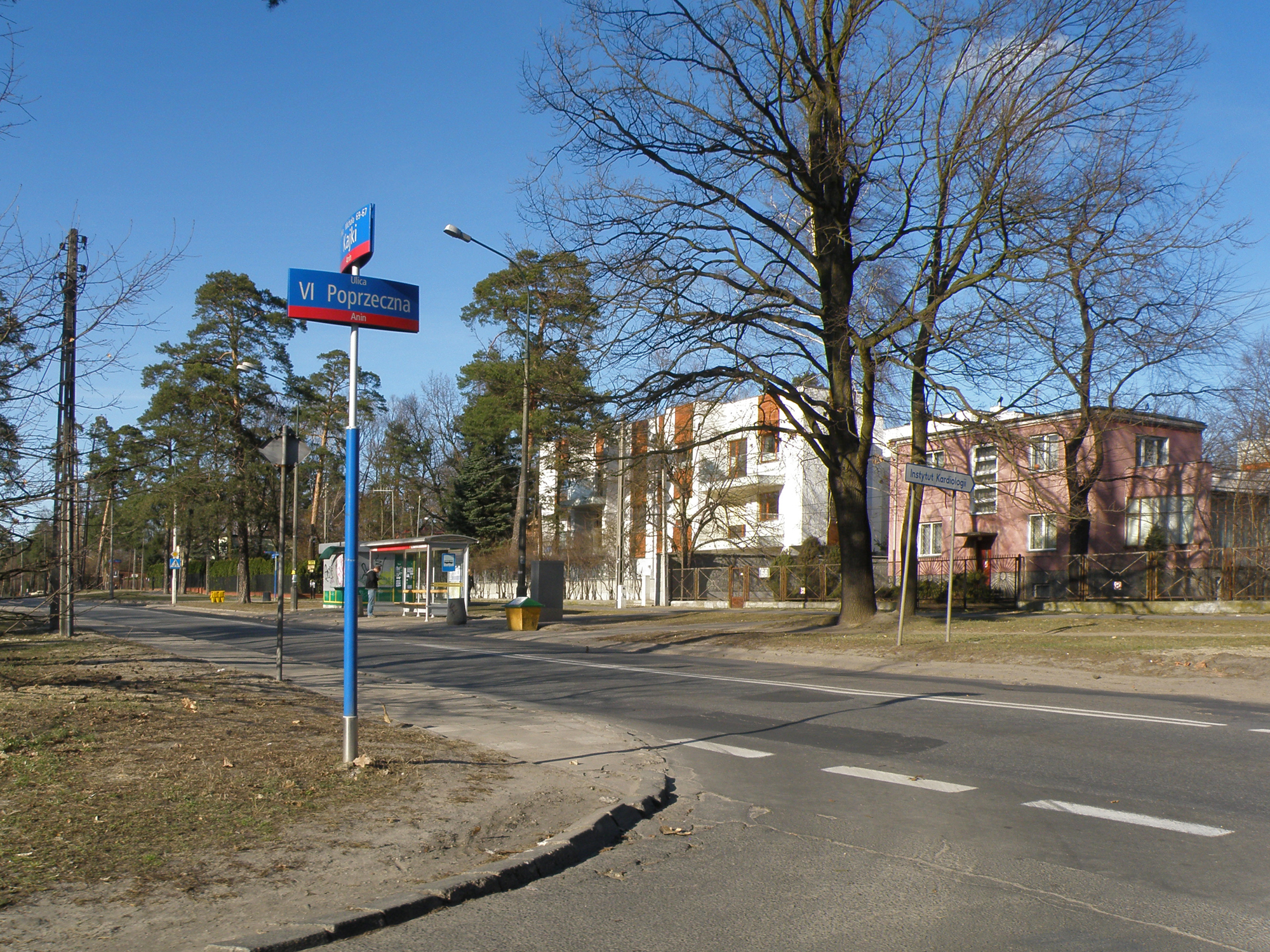

- Country: Poland
- City: Warsaw
- District/Borough: Wawer

Anin is a subdistrict of Wawer, in south-east Warsaw.
