= Wawer =

- Warsaw District
- Flag Coat of arms

- Location of Wawer within Warsaw
- Coordinates: 52°12′50″N 21°9′29″E
- Country: Poland
- Voivodeship: Masovian
- County/City: Warsaw

Government
  - Mayor: Norbert Szczepański

Area
  - Total: 79.7 km^{2} (30.8 sq mi)

Population (2019)
  - Total: 77,205
  - Density: 969/km^{2} (2,510/sq mi)
- Time zone: UTC+1 (CET)
  - Summer (DST): UTC+2 (CEST)
- Area code: +48 22
- Website: wawer.um.warszawa.pl

Wawer (Polish pronunciation: [ˈvavɛr]) is one of the districts of Warsaw, located in the south-eastern part of the city. The Vistula river runs along its western border. Wawer became a district of Warsaw on 27 October 2002 (previously it was a part of Praga Południe district, and a municipality earlier).

Wawer borders Praga Południe and Rembertów from the north, Wesoła from the east and Wilanów with Mokotów from the west (across the Vistula).

== History ==
The name Wawer comes from the name of the Wawer inn (Karczma Wawer, currently known as Zajazd Napoleoński). The oldest mention of the tavern comes from 1727, and the Wawer colony was established in 1838. First settlers appeared in 1839. During the November Uprising, the first and second Wawer battles took place here in early 1831.

On the night of 26/27 December 1939 German occupiers committed the Wawer massacre.

In 1951, Wawer was incorporated into Warsaw.

In 1960, Wawer was incorporated into the Praga Południe district. In 1994 Wawer reappeared on the map of Warsaw as a commune (Warsaw - Wawer). In 2002, the Wawer commune was transformed into a district.

== Nature ==
Wawer contains an area of swamp and wetlands, Wawer Bend. Wawer's forests are home to wild boar.

== Boroughs ==
- Aleksandrów
- Anin
- Falenica
- Las
- Marysin Wawerski
- Miedzeszyn
- Międzylesie
- Nadwiśle
- Radość
- Sadul
- Wawer
- Zerzeń
