= Otwock railway station =

Railway station in Otwock, Poland

Otwock
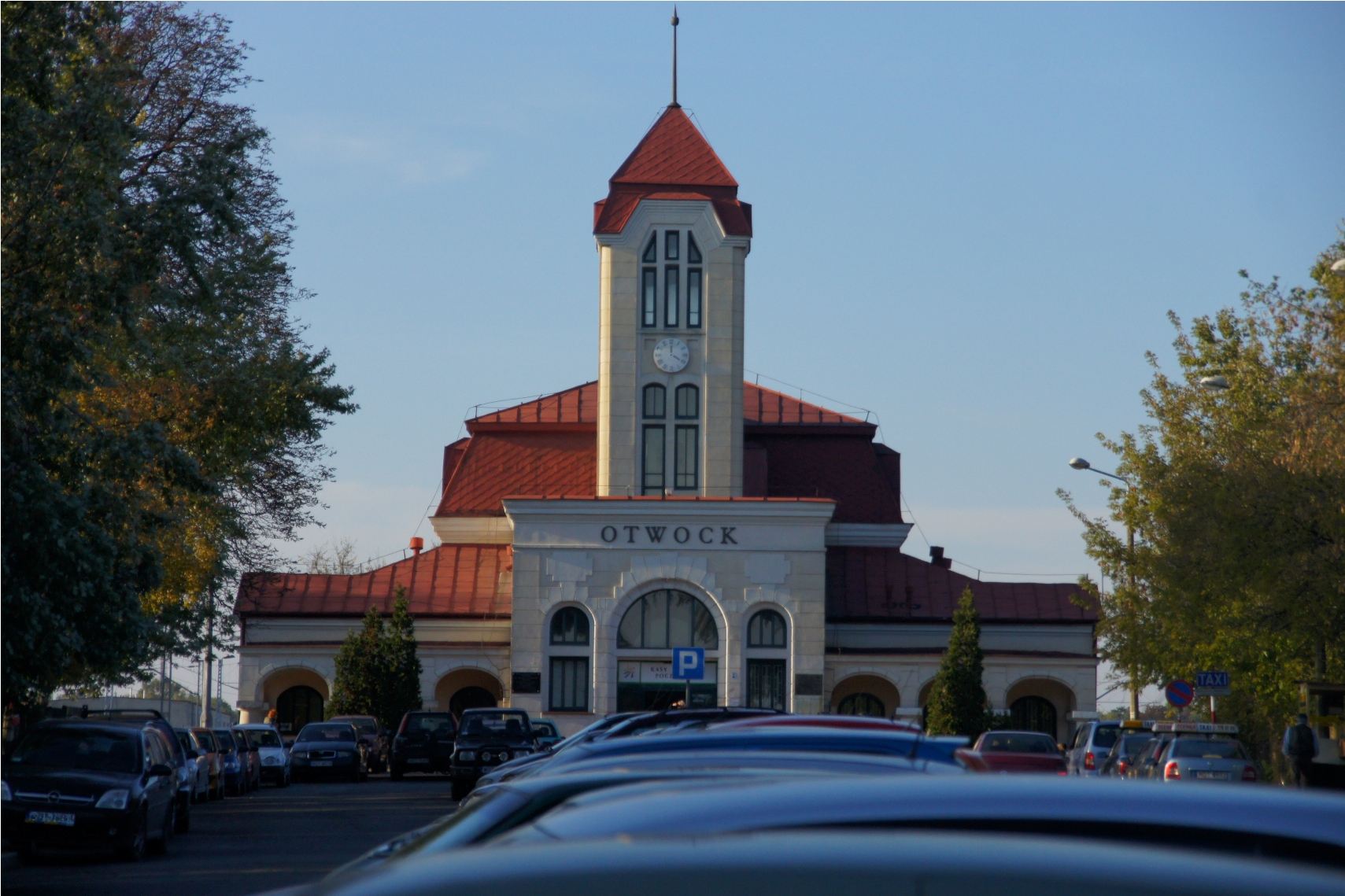

General information
- Location: Otwock, Masovian; Poland
- Coordinates: 52°06′32″N 21°15′48″E
- System: C
- Owner: Polskie Koleje Państwowe S.A.
- Platforms: 4
- Tracks: 6

Services
Preceding station	PKP Intercity	Following station
Warszawa Wschodnia towards Kołobrzeg	TLK	Pilawa towards Kraków Główny
Preceding station	Masovian Railways	Following station
Świder towards Warszawa Zachodnia	R7	Śródborów towards Dęblin
Preceding station	SKM Warsaw	Following station
Otwock Świder towards Pruszków	S1	Terminus
Otwock Świder towards Warszawa Wschodnia	S10	Terminus
Location
- Location within Masovian Voivodeship Location within Poland Location within Europe

Otwock railway station is a railway station in Otwock, Poland. The station is served by Masovian Railways, who run trains from Warszawa Zachodnia to Dęblin, and Rapid Urban Railway (Warsaw), whose trains from Pruszków PKP terminate at Otwock. It is classified as C under the categories of Polish rail stations.

== History ==
Otwock station opened in 1877, together with the Vistula River Railroad. The present-day station building was constructed in 1910. The rail line through the station was electrified in 1936, to serve Warsaw suburban passenger trains.

During the years 2018-2021, the station underwent complete modernization.

On 8 September 2025, PKP announced that the Main Station Building and the surrounding parking lots would be completely renovated. Some of the plans included better accessibility for disabled people, more trees and bike paths.

== Train services ==
The station is served by the following service(s):

- Intercity services (TLK) Kołobrzeg — Gdynia Główna — Warszawa Wschodnia — Kraków Główny
