= Warszawa Wschodnia railway station =

Railway station in Warsaw, Poland

Warszawa Wschodnia Warsaw East
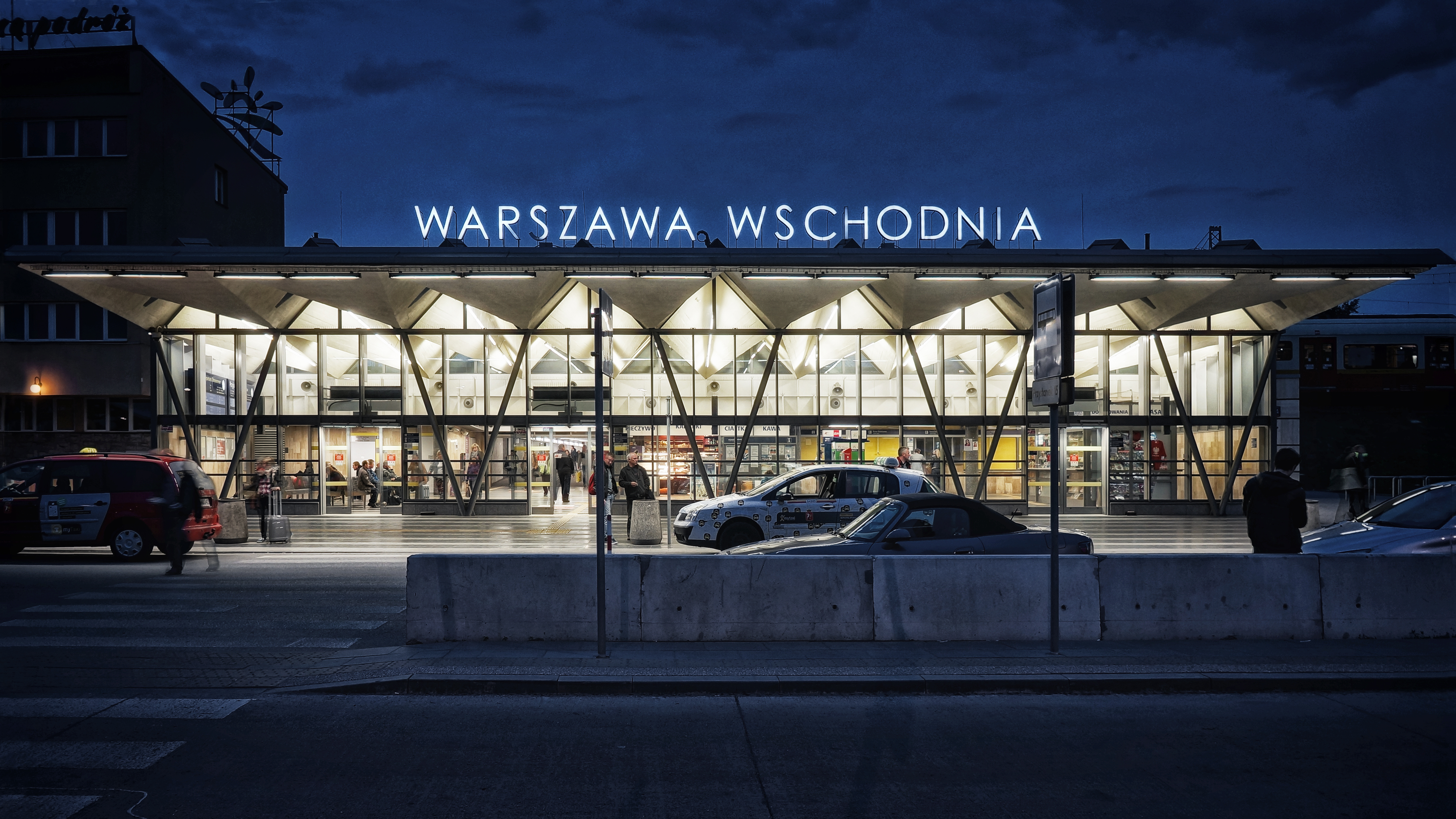

General information
- Location: Praga Południe, Warsaw, Masovian; Poland
- Coordinates: 52°15′03″N 21°03′10″E
- System: A
- Owner: Polskie Koleje Państwowe S.A.
- Platforms: 7
- Tracks: 14

History
- Opened: 1866 (Rebuilt 1933, 1969)
- Former names: Terespol Train Station (Polish: Dworzec Terespolski)
Location
- Location of station in Warsaw

Warszawa Wschodnia, in English Warsaw East, is one of the most important railway stations in Warsaw, Poland. Its more official name is Warszawa Wschodnia Osobowa (translated as Warsaw East Passenger). It is located on the eastern side of the Vistula river, on the border of the Praga-Północ and Praga-Południe districts, on the Warsaw Cross-City Line. It serves all trains passing through the larger Warszawa Centralna and Śródmieście stations which stop or terminate at Wschodnia station. It is one of the busiest railway stations in Poland, with over 800 daily trains.

== History ==
The station first started operating in 1866 as the terminus of the newly built Warsaw–Terespol Railway. By 1933 the station was rebuilt as a through the station with the opening of the Cross-City line. The station building was destroyed during World War II, and in postwar decades provisional, temporary buildings were used to serve passengers.

The current station building opened in 1969 and was for a while the most modern large station in Warsaw. In the following years, it received little investment and so fell into disrepair. At the beginning of the 21st century, it was considered the worst railway station in Poland, according to Gazeta Wyborcza which gave it last place in the ranking of 23 most significant Polish railway stations.

The station building was renovated for the UEFA Euro 2012 championship.

As of May 2021, its sister station Warsaw Zachodnia station appears to be under significant reconstruction.

== Train services ==
The station is served by the following service(s):

- EuroCity services (EC) (EC 95 by DB) (EIC by PKP) Berlin - Frankfurt (Oder) - Rzepin - Poznań - Kutno - Warsaw
- Express Intercity Premium services (EIP) Gdynia - Warsaw
- Express Intercity Premium services (EIP) Warsaw - Wrocław
- Express Intercity Premium services (EIP) Warsaw - Katowice - Bielsko-Biała
- Express Intercity Premium services (EIP) Gdynia - Warsaw - Katowice - Gliwice/Bielsko-Biała
- Express Intercity Premium services (EIP) Warsaw - Kraków
- Express Intercity Premium services (EIP) Gdynia/Kołobrzeg - Warsaw - Kraków (- Rzeszów)
- Express Intercity services (EIC) Szczecin — Warsaw
- Express Intercity services (EIC) Warsaw - Wrocław
- Express Intercity services (EIC) Warsaw - Kraków - Zakopane
- Intercity services (IC) Wrocław- Opole - Częstochowa - Warszawa
- Intercity services (IC) Wrocław - Ostrów Wielkopolski - Łódź - Warszawa
- Intercity services (IC) Zgorzelec - Legnica - Wrocław - Ostrów Wielkopolski - Łódź - Warszawa
- Intercity services (IC) Białystok - Warszawa - Częstochowa - Opole - Wrocław
- Intercity services (IC) Białystok - Warszawa - Łódź - Ostrów Wielkopolski - Wrocław
- Intercity services (IC) Ełk - Białystok - Warszawa - Łódź - Ostrów Wielkopolski - Wrocław
- Intercity services (IC) Warszawa - Częstochowa - Katowice - Bielsko-Biała
- Intercity services (IC) Białystok - Warszawa - Częstochowa - Katowice - Bielsko-Biała
- Intercity services (IC) Łódź Fabryczna — Warszawa Wschodnia
- Intercity services (IC) Łódź Fabryczna — Warszawa — Lublin Główny
- Intercity services (IC) Olsztyn - Warszawa - Skierniewice - Łódź
- Intercity services (IC) Olsztyn - Warszawa - Skierniewice - Częstochowa - Katowice - Bielsko-Biała
- Intercity services (IC) Olsztyn - Warszawa - Skierniewice - Częstochowa - Katowice - Gliwice - Racibórz
- Intercity services (TLK) Warszawa - Częstochowa - Lubliniec - Opole - Wrocław - Szklarska Poręba Górna
- Intercity services (TLK) Warszawa - Częstochowa - Katowice - Opole - Wrocław - Szklarska Poręba Górna
- Intercity services (TLK) Gdynia Główna — Zakopane
- Intercity services (TLK) Kołobrzeg — Gdynia Główna — Warszawa Wschodnia — Kraków Główny
- Regional services (ŁKA) Łódz - Warsaw

Preceding station	PKP Intercity	Following station
Warszawa Centralna towards Berlin Hbf	EuroCity EC 95; EIC	Terminus
Warszawa Centralna towards Warszawa Zachodnia	Kyiv-Express	Mińsk Mazowiecki towards Kyiv-Pasazhyrskyi
Iława Główna towards Gdynia Główna	EIP	Warszawa Centralna Terminus
Terminus	EIP	Warszawa Centralna towards Wrocław Główny
Terminus	EIP	Warszawa Centralna towards Bielsko-Biała Główna
Iława Główna towards Gdynia Główna	EIP	Warszawa Centralna towards Gliwice or Bielsko-Biała Główna
Terminus	EIP	Warszawa Centralna towards Kraków Główny
Iława Główna towards Gdynia Główna or Kołobrzeg	EIP	Warszawa Centralna towards Kraków Główny or Rzeszów Główny
Warszawa Centralna towards Szczecin Główny	EIC	Terminus
Terminus	EIC	Warszawa Centralna towards Wrocław Główny
Terminus	EIC	Warszawa Centralna towards Zakopane
Terminus	IC Via Warszawa Gdańska	Warszawa Gdańska towards Bielsko-Biała Główna, Wrocław Główny or Zgorzelec
Terminus	IC Via Warszawa Zachodnia	Warszawa Centralna towards Wrocław Główny
Wołomin towards Białystok or Ełk	IC	Warszawa Centralna towards Wrocław Główny
Wołomin towards Białystok	IC	Warszawa Centralna towards Bielsko-Biała Główna
Warszawa Gdańska towards Łódź Fabryczna	IC	Terminus
Warszawa Gdańska towards Łódź Fabryczna	IC	Pilawa towards Lublin Główny
Warszawa Centralna towards Łódź Fabryczna	IC	Legionowo towards Olsztyn Główny
Warszawa Centralna towards Bielsko-Biała Główna or Racibórz	IC	Legionowo towards Olsztyn Główny
Warszawa Gdańska towards Szklarska Poręba Górna	TLK	Terminus
Warszawa Centralna towards Szklarska Poręba Górna	TLK	Terminus
Legionowo towards Gdynia Główna	TLK	Warszawa Centralna towards Zakopane
Legionowo towards Kołobrzeg	TLK	Otwock towards Kraków Główny
Preceding station	Masovian Railways	Following station
Warszawa Stadion towards Skierniewice	R1	Terminus
Warszawa Centralna towards Skierniewice	RE1	Terminus
Warszawa Stadion towards Warszawa Zachodnia	R2	Warszawa Rembertów towards Łuków
Warszawa Stadion towards Kutno	R3	Terminus
Warszawa Stadion towards Warszawa Zachodnia	R6	Warszawa Rembertów towards Czyżew
Warszawa Stadion towards Warszawa Zachodnia	R7	Warszawa Olszynka Grochowska towards Dęblin
Warszawa Stadion towards Góra Kalwaria or Skarżysko-Kamienna	R8	Terminus
Warszawa Stadion towards Góra Kalwaria or Skarżysko-Kamienna	RE8	Terminus
Warszawa Stadion towards Warszawa Zachodnia	R9	Warszawa Praga towards Działdowo
Warszawa Centralna towards Warszawa Zachodnia	RE9	Warszawa Toruńska towards Działdowo
Warszawa Centralna towards Warsaw Chopin Airport	RL	Warszawa Toruńska towards Modlin
Preceding station	ŁKA	Following station
Warszawa Centralna towards Łódź Fabryczna	Łódź - Warsaw	Terminus
Preceding station	SKM Warsaw	Following station
Warszawa Centralna towards Pruszków	S1	Warszawa Gocławek towards Otwock
Terminus	S10	Warszawa Gocławek towards Otwock
Warszawa Stadion towards Warsaw Chopin Airport	S2	Warszawa Rembertów towards Sulejówek Miłosna
Terminus	S20	Warszawa Rembertów towards Sulejówek Miłosna

Preceding station	PKP Intercity	Following station
Former services
Poznań Główny towards Paris Est	EuroNight Moscou Express; Suspended 2020	Terespol towards Moscow Belorussky

== Gallery ==
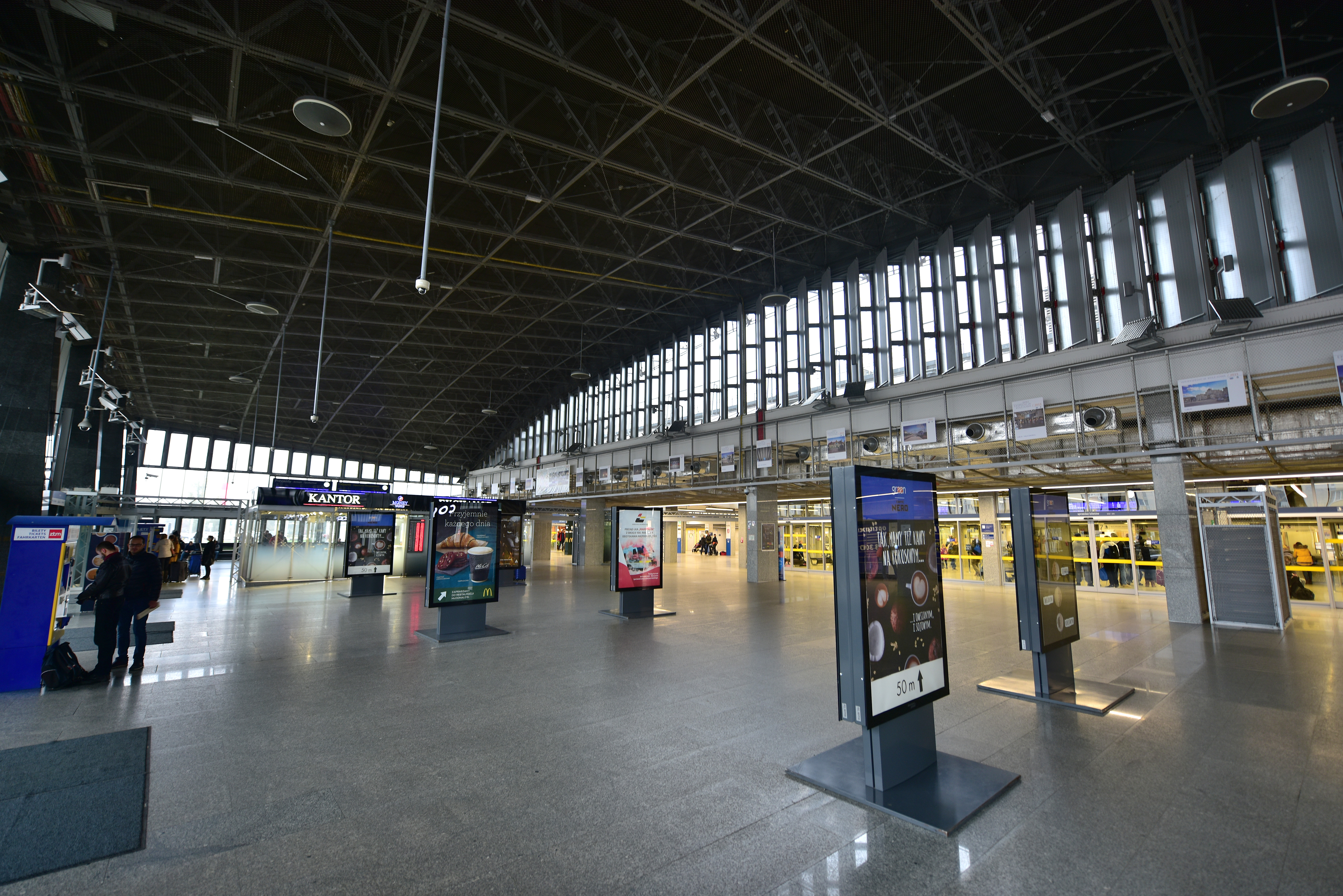
Interior of the station, 2018

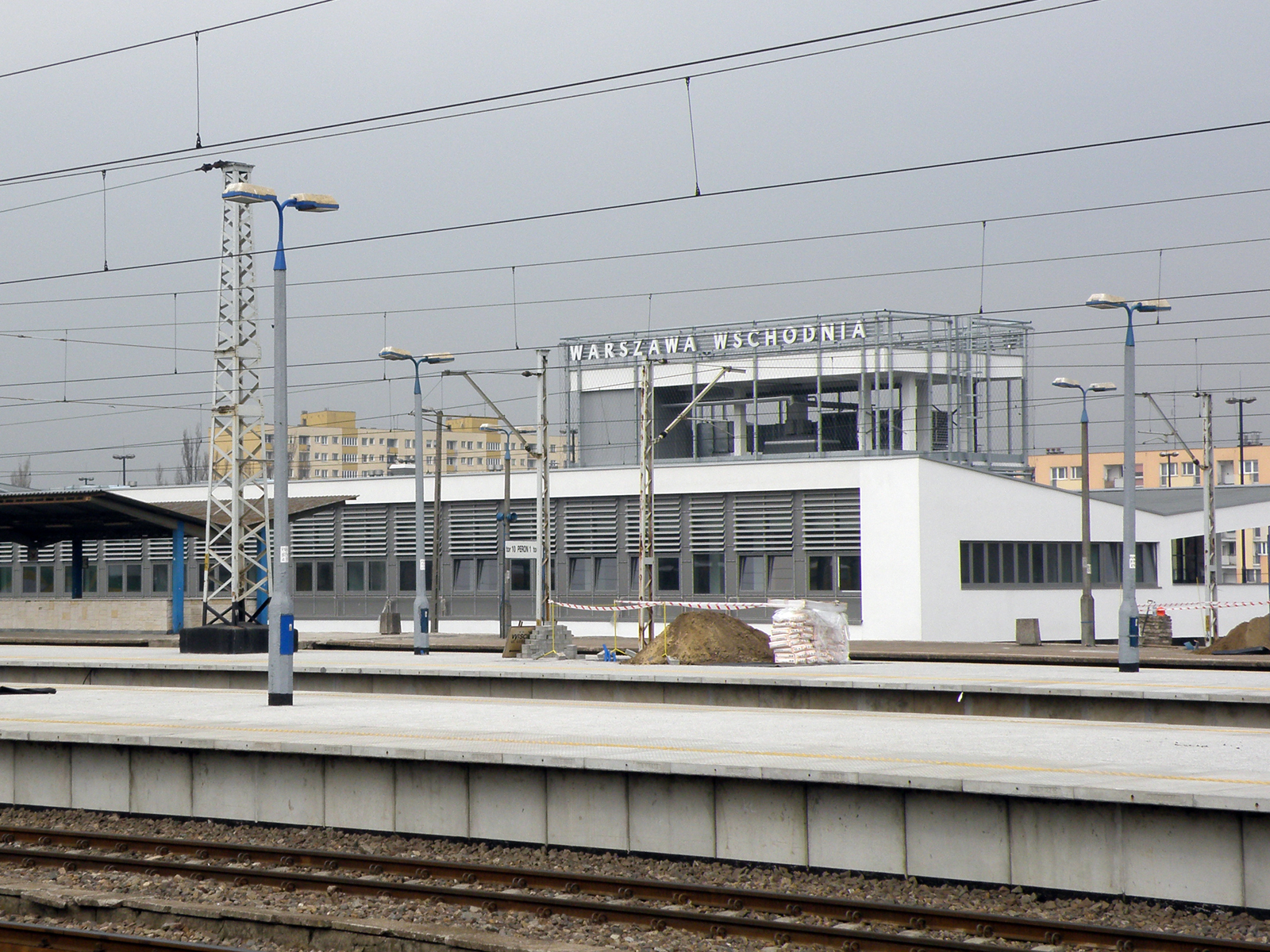
Warszawa Wschodnia after modernization

== See also ==
- Rail transport in Poland
- List of busiest railway stations in Poland
