= Pruszków railway station =

Railway station in Pruszków, Poland

Pruszków
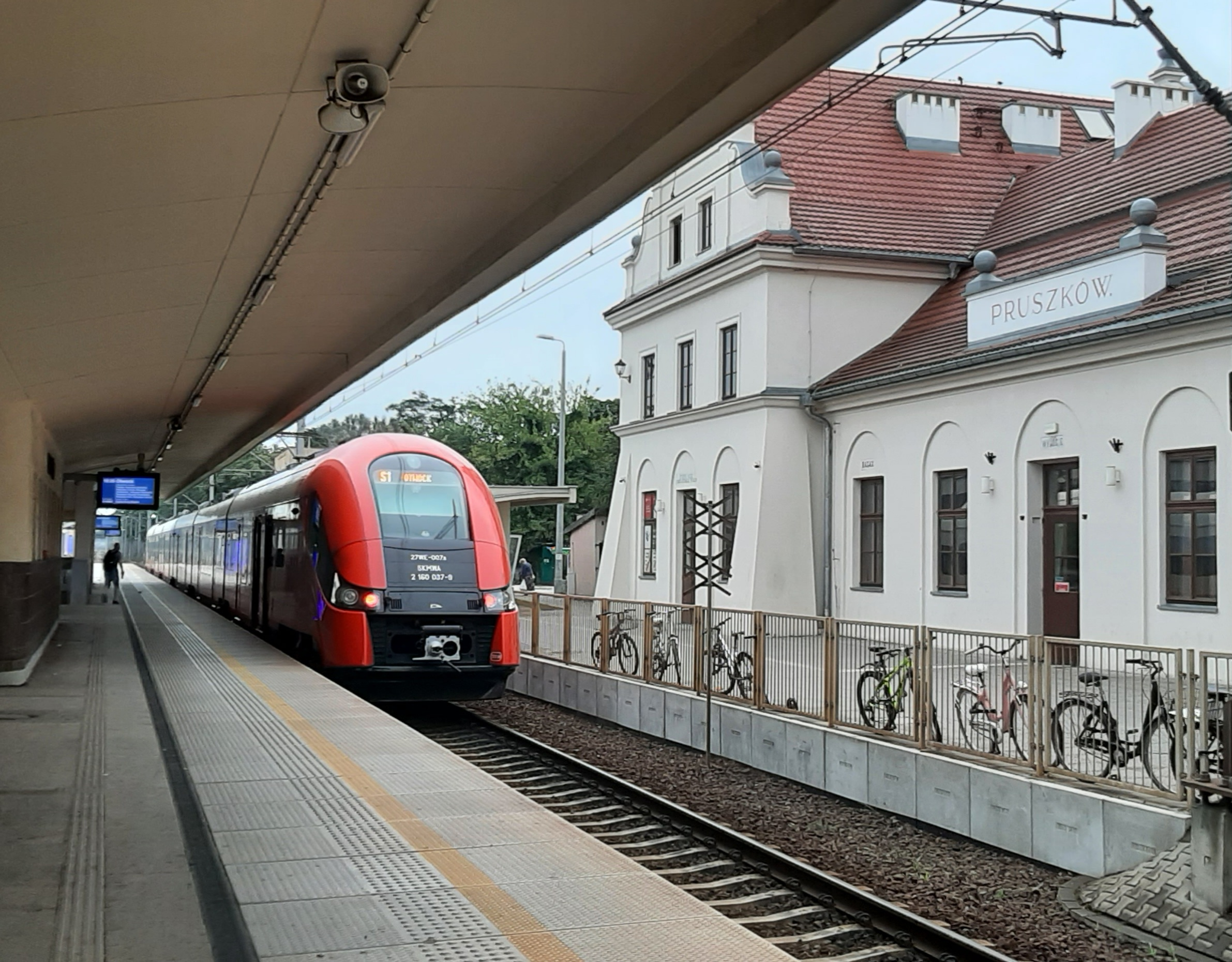
- Rapid Urban Railway Pesa Elf at the station

General information
- Location: Pruszków, Masovian Voivodeship; Poland
- Coordinates: 52°10′05″N 20°47′55″E
- Owner: Polskie Koleje Państwowe S.A.
- Platforms: 1
- Tracks: 2

History
- Opened: 1845

Services
Preceding station	Masovian Railways	Following station
Parzniew towards Skierniewice	R1	Piastów towards Warszawa Wschodnia or Warszawa Główna
Preceding station	SKM Warsaw	Following station
Terminus	S1	Piastów towards Otwock or Warszawa Główna
Location
- Location within Masovian Voivodeship Location within Poland Location within Europe

Pruszków railway station is a railway station in Pruszków, Poland. The station is served by Masovian Railways, who run trains from Skierniewice to Warszawa Wschodnia, Polregio, who run some services from Warszawa Wschodnia and Rzeszów Główny via Pruszków and by Rapid Urban Railway, who operate line S1 which begins at this station, runs on the suburban tracks of the Cross City Line and goes on to Otwock, terminating there.
