= Rail transport in Warsaw =

- Ariel view of Warszawa Zachodnia in 2025

Operation
- National railway: Polish State Railways
- Infrastructure company: PKP Polish Railway Lines
- Major operators: Masovian Railways; Rapid Urban Railway; Warsaw Metro; Warsaw Commuter Railway

Statistics
- Ridership: 102.3 million (2024)

System length
- Total: ~100 km (62 mi)
- Freight only: ~30 km (19 mi)

Track gauge
- Main: 1,435 mm (4 ft 8 1/2 in) standard gauge

Electrification
- Mainline: 3 kV DC
- Warsaw Metro: 750 V DC

Features
- No. of bridges: 3
- Longest bridge: Citadel railway bridge 505 m (1,657 ft)
- No. of stations: 51
Map

Rail transport in Warsaw consists of the Warsaw Railway Junction (Polish: Warszawski Węzeł Kolejowy) which is a set of seven major railway lines centred on the city. In 2024, the lines of the Warsaw Railway Junction served approximately 350,000 passengers daily. The hub consists of seven mainlines going to Białystok, Terespol, Lublin, Radom, Łódź, Poznań and Gdańsk, connected by the Warsaw Cross-City Line and the Warsaw Orbital Railway, and the Warsaw Commuter Railway to Grodzisk Mazowiecki.

Apart from train stations in Warsaw, the hub includes the cities of Grodzisk Mazowiecki, Milanówek, Piastów, Pruszków, Sochaczew, Błonie, Ożarów, Nowy Dwór Mazowiecki, Legionowo, Tłuszcz, Wołomin, Mińsk Mazowiecki, Sulejówek, Otwock, Warka and Piaseczno.

The first railway line in Warsaw was the Warsaw–Vienna railway, opened in 1845, linking the city with the border between the Russian ruled Congress Poland and Austrian ruled Galicia where it connected with the Austrian railways. In 1862 the Warsaw-Saint Petersburg Railway was opened connecting Warsaw through Vilnius (Wilno) with the Russian capital followed by the Warsaw–Terespol Railway in 1866, both lines were built to the Russian broad gauge and only reached the city's eastern part on the right bank of Vistula River, known as Praga, as the occupational authorities blocked the construction of a railway bridge across the river for strategic reasons, only allowing the rail terminals to be connected by a horse tram. In 1875, the Warsaw Circumferential Line was built along with a railway bridge located near the Russian stronghold in the Warsaw Citadel. In 1877 the Vistula River Railroad was built as the third broad gauge line on the right bank in Warsaw linking the city with Kovel and with the border of Polish territories under Prussian control in East Prussia. In 1902 the broad gauge Warsaw–Kalisz Railway was constructed on the left bank of the Vistula river connecting Warsaw through Łódź to Kalisz and later extended to the border of the Prussian controlled Province of Posen. After Poland regained independence following World War I all rail lines in the country were converted to standard gauge and in 1919 the Polish State Railways began an extensive reconstruction of the city's railway junction connecting the former terminals of the Vienna and Terespol lines with the Warsaw Cross-City Line, opened in 1933, electrifying the line (1936) and constructing the Warszawa Główna railway station (opened in 1938). In 1934 a new railway line was opened connecting Warsaw with Radom and further with Kraków finalizing the present day track layout.
