= Dęblin railway station =

Railway station in Dęblin, Poland

Dęblin
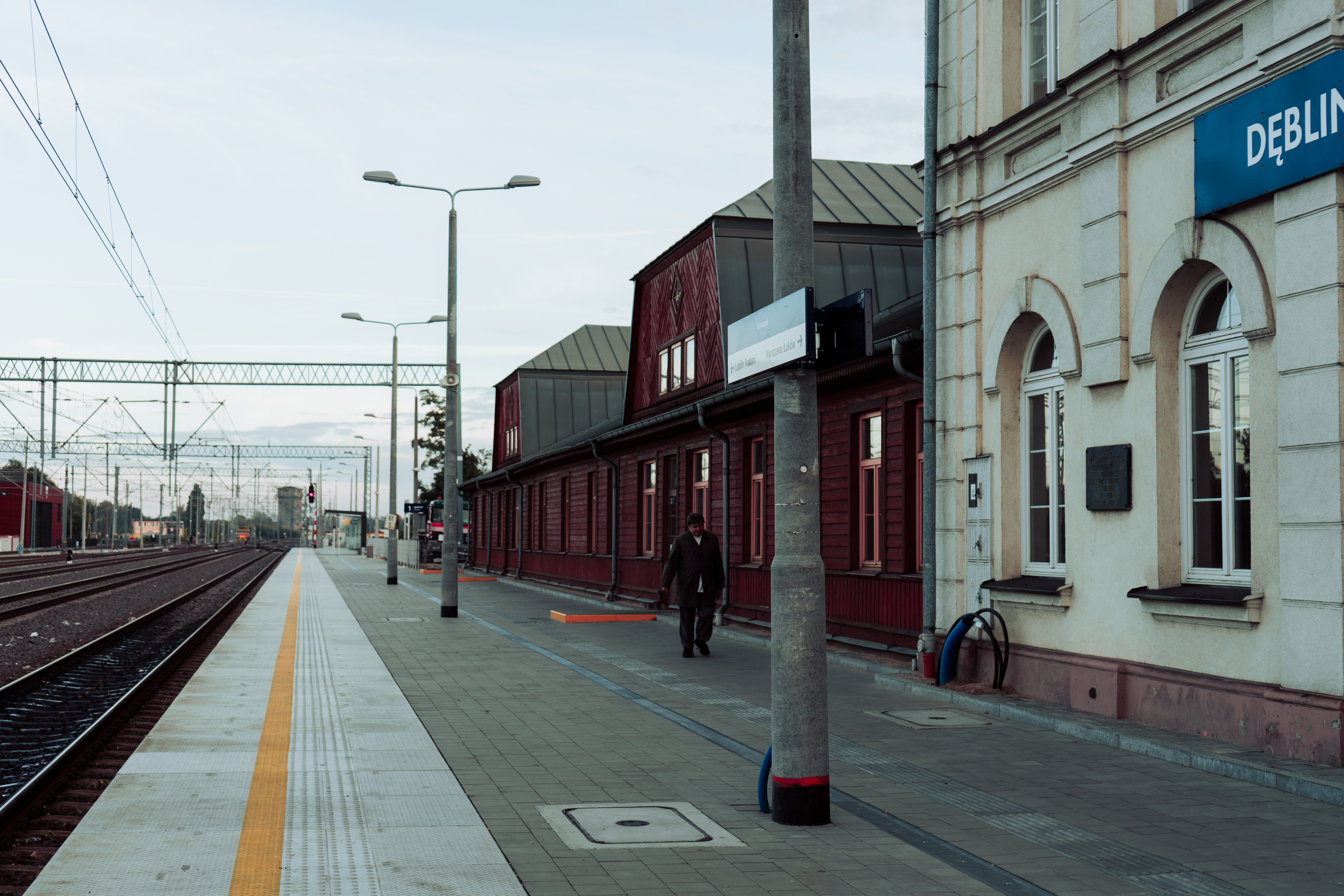

General information
- Location: Dęblin, Lublin; Poland
- Coordinates: 51°34′39″N 21°50′07″E
- Owner: Polskie Koleje Państwowe S.A.
- Platforms: 3
- Tracks: 5

Construction
- Structure type: Building: Yes

Services
Preceding station	PKP Intercity	Following station
Nałęczów towards Lublin Główny	IC	Pilawa towards Łódź Fabryczna
Pilawa towards Kołobrzeg	IC	Puławy Miasto towards Hrubieszów Miasto
Pilawa towards Kołobrzeg	TLK	Pionki Zachodnie towards Kraków Główny
Preceding station	Masovian Railways	Following station
Rokitnia Stara towards Warszawa Zachodnia	R7	Terminus
Terminus	R81	Zajezierze koło Dęblina towards Radom
Location

Dęblin railway station is a railway station serving Dęblin in Lublin Voivodeship, Poland. It is served by Masovian Railways (who run services from Dęblin to Warszawa Zachodnia and Radom), Polregio and PKP Intercity (TLK services).

During the Holocaust thousands of Jews were deported from Dęblin–Irena Ghetto to the extermination camps via this station.

== Train services ==
The station is served by the following service(s):

- Intercity services (IC) Łódź Fabryczna — Warszawa — Lublin Główny
- Intercity services (TLK) Kołobrzeg — Gdynia Główna — Warszawa Wschodnia — Kraków Główny
