= Niedźwiadek =

Neighbourhood of Warsaw, Poland

- Neighbourhood and City Information System area
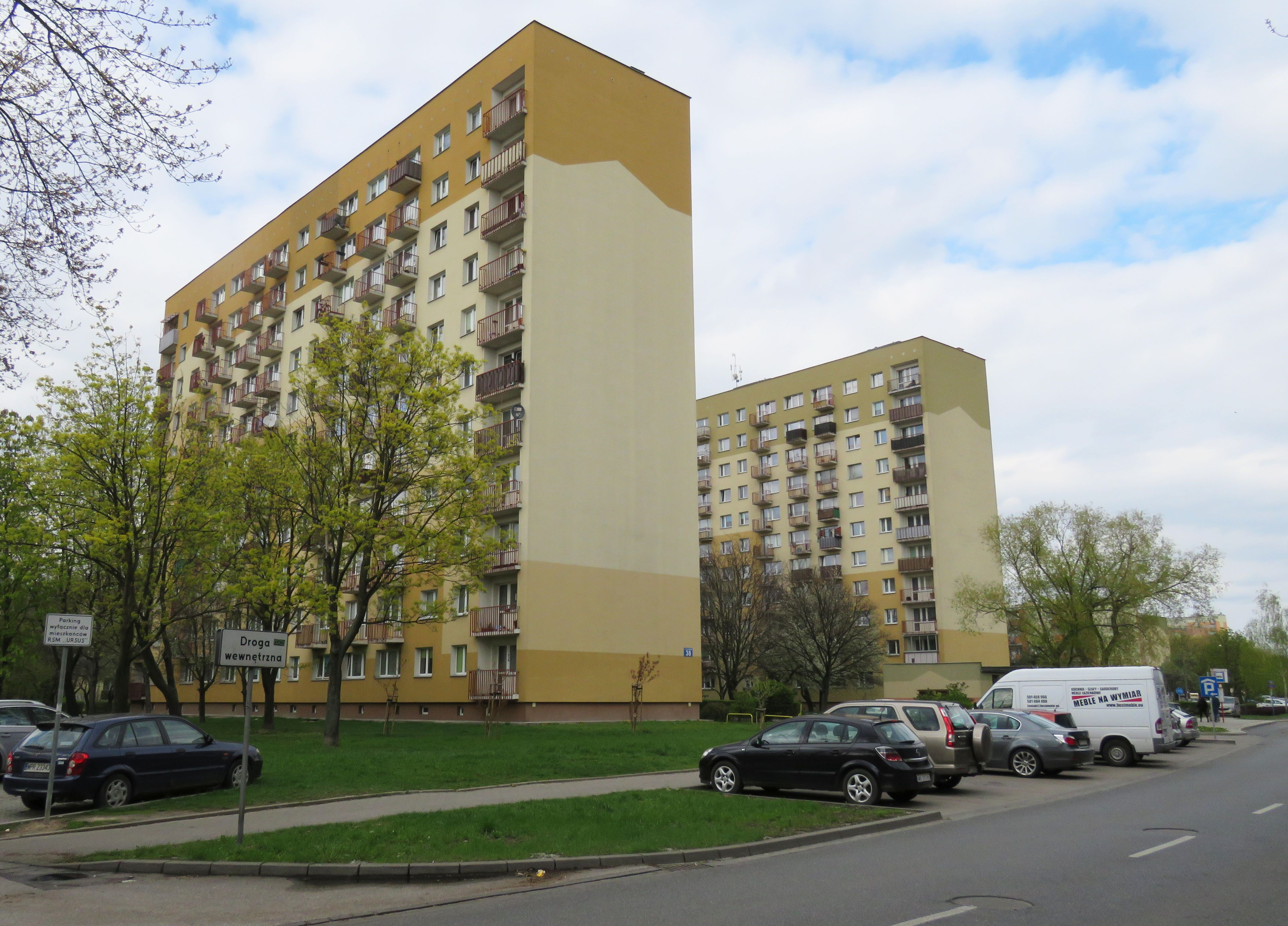
- The apartment buildings in Niedźwiadek, in 2017.

- Location of Niedźwiadek within the district of Ursus, in accordance to the City Information System.
- Coordinates: 52°11′48″N 20°52′15″E
- Country: Poland
- Voivodeship: Masovian
- City county: Warsaw
- District: Ursus
- Time zone: UTC+1 (CET)
  - Summer (DST): UTC+2 (CEST)
- Area code: +48 22

Niedźwiadek (Polish: [ɲɛd͡ʑˈvja.dɛk]; lit. 'bear cub') is a residential neighbourhood built between 1968 and 1978, under the official name Spółdzielcze Osiedle Mieszkaniowe "Niedźwiadek"; since 2003, it also is the name of an area in City Information System. Both are part of Ursus district, Warsaw, Poland.

The neighbourhood was built between 1968 and 1977, to provide housing to the employees of the nearby Ursus factory.

== History ==
=== Before the 1960s ===
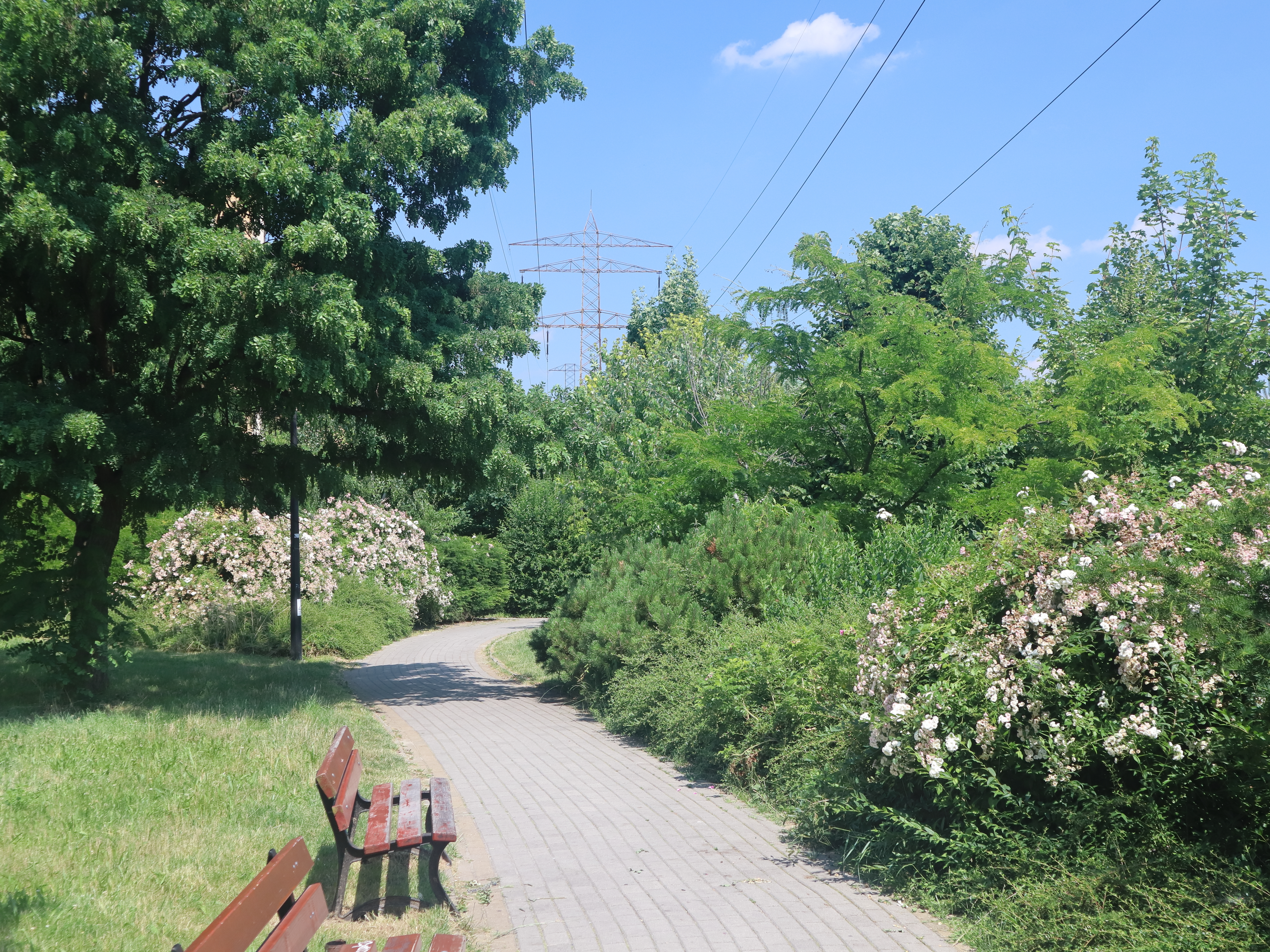
The Hass Park in Niedźwiadek, in 2021, 14 years after its establishment. It is located on western part of land formerly owned by Hass family.

The land on which today's Niedźwiadek stands, for many decades was divided into several farms, which belonged ie. to Krystian and Petronela Hass (the other family branch had a farm in Skorosze, to the southeast), Antoni Boguszewski, and Leon Haas (Note: Despite the similarity, Haas and Hass families were unrelated.). In 1935, Hass' land was divided between family' children – western part was given to Krystian's son Zygmunt, while eastern was given to the couple's seven daughters. Zygmunt's son, Antoni, inherited the land after World War II.

=== 1965–1978: construction of Niedźwiadek ===
Work on the new neighborhood for Ursus factory workers began in the early 1960s. 1964 saw the first preparation works carried out; on 9 January 1965, the Association of Polish Architects announced the results of a competition for the neighborhood's design. The winning project was designed by Stefan Putowski, which ensured favorable spatial conditions and a relatively large diversity of urban interior, on which AoPA put the major emphasis.

In the project, Putowski designed the neighborhood's north-south axis along Wołodyjowskiego Street (today's Keniga Street), which, in the southern part, was to pass under the former Warsaw–Vienna railway (today's lines No. 1 and No. 447), to the southern part of Ursus, where it was to connect with planned an Ursus-West neighborhood and eventually with Kompanii Kordian Street. Both neighborhoods were to be served by a railway stop on railway line no. 447. In Niedźwiadek itself, the plan was to build several schools, kindergartens, a hotel and a community centre.

The construction of Niedźwiadek began in 1968. The first buildings were constructed on Sienkiewicza Street (today's Wojciechowskiego Street), on lands previously owned by Antoni and Leon Haas. In 1973, the neighborhood was granted its primary school, as Primary School No. 1 moved in from Czechowice. The first regular public transport connection from Warsaw, in the form of a busline, reached Niedźwiadek in January 1977.

Construction work was finished in 1978. Niedźwiadek had 18,500 inhabitants living in 83 buildings, and the neighborhood covered an area of 60 ha in total, managed by Robotnicza Spółdzielnia Mieszkaniowa Ursus (Ursus Worker's Housing Association). The finished neighborhood was bigger than in Putowski's project, as the final area included the part intended to separate Niedźwiadek from planned (and eventually not built) municipal cemetery, but there were 1,100 inhabitants less than Putowski had planned.

=== Since 1978 ===
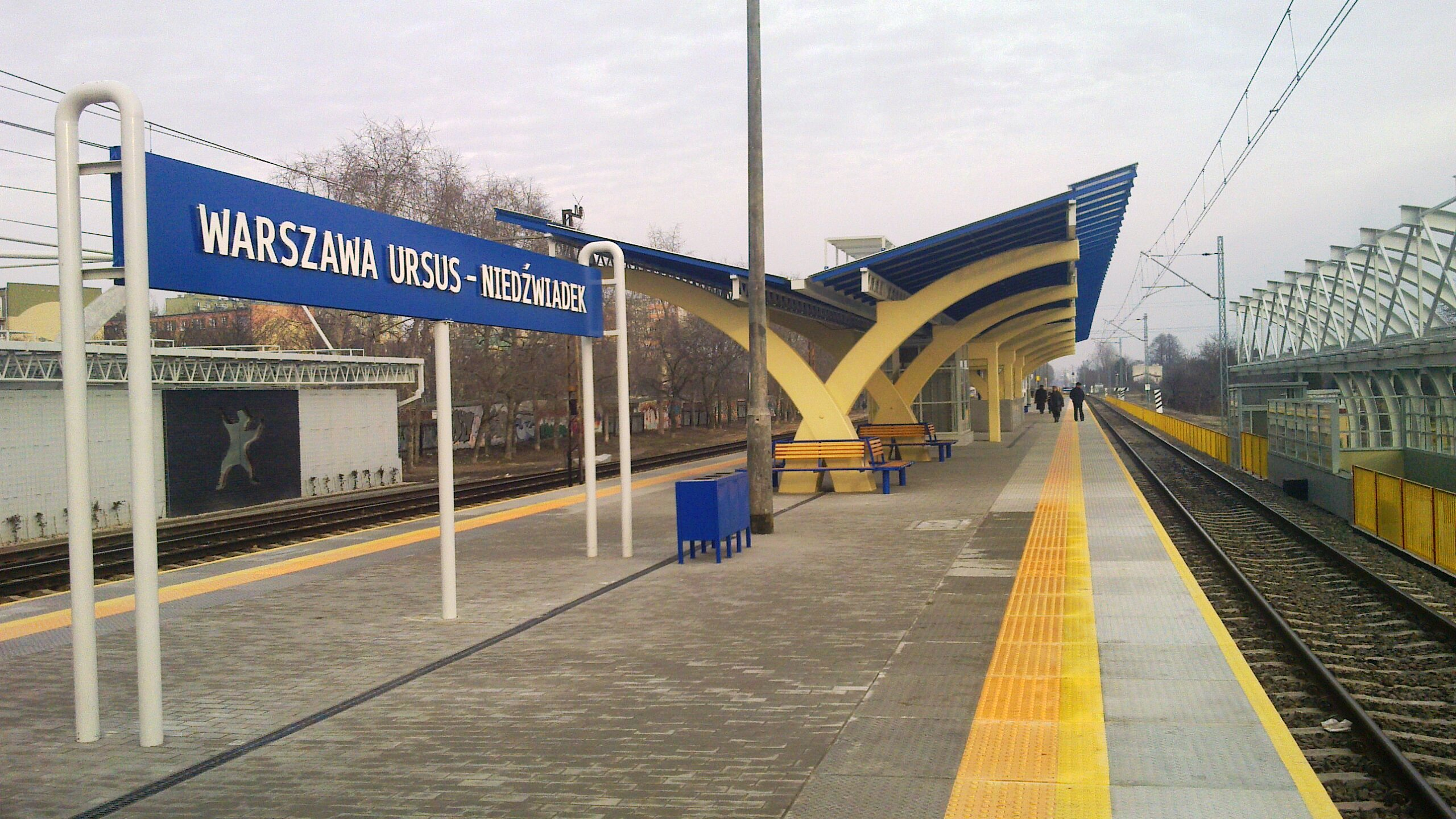
The Warszawa Ursus-Niedźwiadek railway stop in 2013, a few days before its official opening. Originally, it was to be constructed 40 years earlier.

The original project, per communist government policy, did not have any church; yet, the 1980s saw the construction of the first Roman Catholic parish church, Our Lady of Fatima Sanctuary, in Niedźwiadek's western part. A former farm owned by Antoni Boguszewski was demolished around the same time, and in its place, a hotel for Ursus factory workers was constructed. In the 1990s, the lands of Antoni Hass were divided into several parts: in the southern part, a bazaar and a swimming pool were built; the northern part was given for the construction of a small Gawra neighborhood; in the central part, a second parish church for Niedźwiadek was built at the turn of the century, and in 2007, the remaining part of Hass' family land was turned into public park.

The railway stop that was planned in 1960s was eventually built and put into operation in 2014, almost 50 years after the first mentions by Association of Polish Architects. The Ursus-West neighborhood was never built.

Since 2003, Niedźwiadek neighborhood shares the name with the City Information System area, which is larger than the original neighborhood.

== Characteristics ==
Niedźwiadek is a residential area, with multifamily residential apartment buildings.

Niedźwiadek is served by a railway stop named after the neighborhood, located on the railway line no. 447, which runs along the railway line no. 1.

Through the western portion of Niedźwiadek goes a section of the Expressway S2.

== Locations and administrative boundaries ==
Niedźwiadek is located within the central-western portion of the district of Ursus, in the city of Warsaw, Poland. In accordance to the City Information System, its boundaries are determined by Warszawska Street to the north, Gierdziejewskiego Street, and Cierlicka Street to the east, the railway line no. 447 to the south, and the railway line no. 1 to the west.

The neighbourhood borders Gołąbki to the north, Szamoty to the north-east, Skorosze to the south-east, Czechowice to the south, and Piastów to the south-west. The western border of the neighborhood marks the border of both the district of Ursus, and the city of Warsaw, and is adjusted to the town of Piastów in Pruszków County.
