= Łódź Andrzejów railway station =

Railway station in Poland

Coordinates: 51°44′26″N 19°37′05″E

Łódź Andrzejów
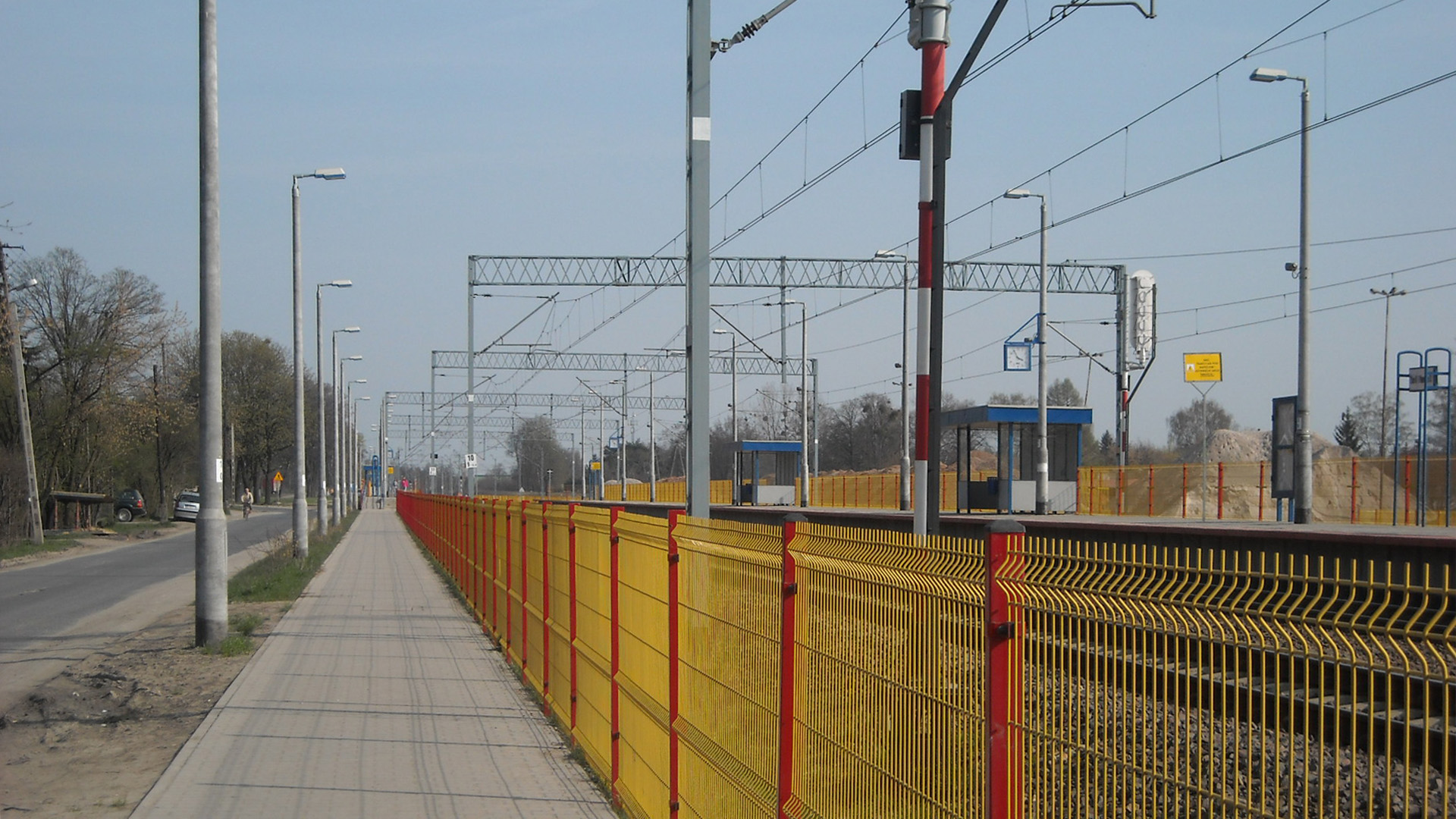
- Area of the station

General information
- Location: Łódź, Widzew district Poland
- System: Commuter Station
- Line: 17 Łódź–Koluszki railway
- Platforms: 2
- Tracks: 3

Services
Preceding station	Polregio	Following station
Łódź Widzew towards Łódź Fabryczna	IR	Koluszki towards Warszawa Główna
Łódź Widzew towards Łódź Kaliska, Ostrów Wielkopolski or Poznań Główny	IR	Koluszki towards Warszawa Główna
Łódź Widzew towards Łódź Fabryczna or Łódź Kaliska	PR	Bedoń towards Częstochowa
Łódź Widzew towards Łódź Kaliska	PR	Bedoń towards Skarżysko-Kamienna
Preceding station	ŁKA	Following station
Łódź Widzew towards Łódź Fabryczna	Łódź - Skierniewice	Bedoń towards Skierniewice
Łódź Widzew towards Łódź Fabryczna	Łódź - Radomsko	Bedoń towards Radomsko
Łódź Widzew towards Łódź Fabryczna	Łódź - Radom	Bedoń towards Radom
Łódź Widzew towards Łódź Fabryczna	Łódź - Skarżysko-Kamienna	Bedoń towards Skarżysko-Kamienna
Location

Łódź Andrzejów (Polish pronunciation: [andʐɛjuv]) is a railway station located in the city of Łódź, in Andrzejów estate, which itself is a part of Widzew district. It was opened in 1865 as one of the stations located between Łódź and Koluszki. The station was incorporated into the city in 1988. Currently it is used mostly by commuter trains, as well as freight trains carrying aggregate to the unloading ramp, which has its branch track going out of station.

== Train services ==
The station is served by the following services:

- InterRegio services (IR) Łódź Fabryczna — Warszawa Glowna
- InterRegio services (IR) Łódź Kaliska — Warszawa Glowna
- InterRegio services (IR) Ostrów Wielkopolski — Łódź — Warszawa Główna
- InterRegio services (IR) Poznań Główny — Ostrów Wielkopolski — Łódź — Warszawa Główna
- Regional services (PR) Łódź Fabryczna — Częstochowa
- Regional services (PR) Łódź Kaliska — Częstochowa
- Regional services (PR) Łódź Kaliska — Skarżysko-Kamienna
