= Łódź–Koluszki railway =

Railway line in Poland

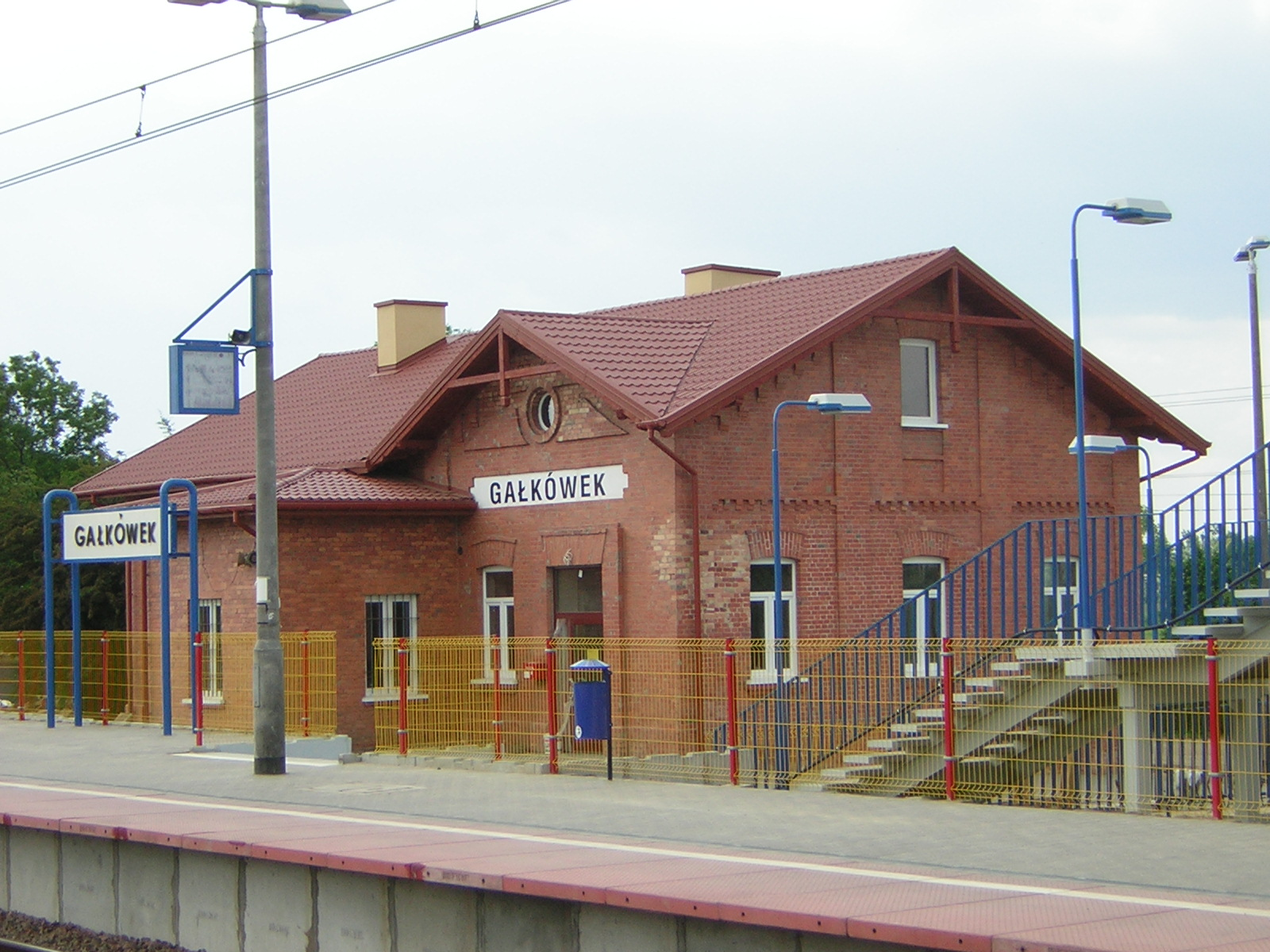
- Gałkówek railway station

Overview
- Native name: Linia kolejowa Łódź Fabryczna - Koluszki
- Status: In use
- Owner: PKP PLK
- Locale: Łódź Voivodeship, Poland
- Termini: Łódź Fabryczna, Łódź; Koluszki, Łódź Voivodeship
- Continues as: 1 Warsaw-Katowice railway (toward Warsaw)
- Connecting lines: Łódź Widzew: 16 to Kutno; 540 to Chojny; 541 to Olechów; Gałkówek: 25 Łódź-Dębica railway; Koluszki: 1 to Katowice; 534 to Słotwiny; 535 to Żakowice Południowe

Service
- Type: Heavy rail
- Route number: 17

History
- Opened: 1865 (freight service); 1866 (passenger service)

Technical
- Line length: 26.347 km (16.371 mi)
- Number of tracks: 2
- Track gauge: 1,435 mm (4 ft 8 1/2 in) standard gauge
- Old gauge: 1,524 mm (5 ft) (second track, 1901-1915)
- Electrification: Overhead wire, 3000 V DC
- Operating speed: 150 km/h (93 mph)

The Łódź—Koluszki railway is a national importance railway line in Poland, connecting Łódź Fabryczna with Koluszki. Due to its character it is the main route for passenger trains passing through the city of Łódź. It is a crucial part of Łódź Cross-City Line.

One section between Łódź Fabryczna and Gałkówek stations is exclusively used by passenger trains.

== History ==
The history of the railway begins in the 19th century. The textile industry in Łódź started to bloom, yet the city had no convenient transportation routes for exporting the goods to other parts of Russian Empire. The closest railway station - Rokiciny, on Warsaw—Vienna railway - was located over 28 kilometres (17 mi) away. It was clear - for further development Łódź needs the railway link.

In 1865, The Łódź Factory Railway Company (pol. Towarzystwo Drogi Żelaznej Fabryczno-Łódzkiej) - a joint venture company of Karl Wilhelm Scheibler and Jan Bloch - was formed, and in the same year, on 30. June. Russian authorities gave the company permission to build a single 1,435 mm (4 ft 8 1/2 in) track railway from Łódź to Koluszki, which were situated on the Warsaw—Vienna railway.

The construction began on 1. September and was finished on 18. November 1865. On 19. November the railway was ceremonially opened, and the freight service began to operate. One year later, due to opening of Łódź Fabryczna station, a regular passenger service started operating.

From 1898 to 1901 the railway received a second track - this time built with 1,524 mm (5 ft) gauge, due to connection with newly built circular railway, going around the southern border of the city to connect with Łódź Kaliska station, located on the west side of the city. Track gauges were unified by Germans during World War I. In 1954 the railway was electrified, while a decade later a connector line, allowing trains from Łódź to head toward Piotrków Trybunalski without turning around in Koluszki, was built.

From 2006 to 2008 the railway line was slightly refurbished to raise the maximum operating speed to 150 kilometres per hour (93 mph). From 2011 to 2012 the section between Łódź Fabryczna and Łódź Widzew stations was rebuilt, as the construction of cross-city tunnel commenced. The section was reopened in December 2016.

== Future ==
The railway is scheduled to receive an extension to the west within the cross-city tunnel, which will allow trains to travel through Łódź Fabryczna station toward Łódź Kaliska and Żabieniec stations
