= Warsaw–Grodzisk Mazowiecki railway =

Railway line in central Poland

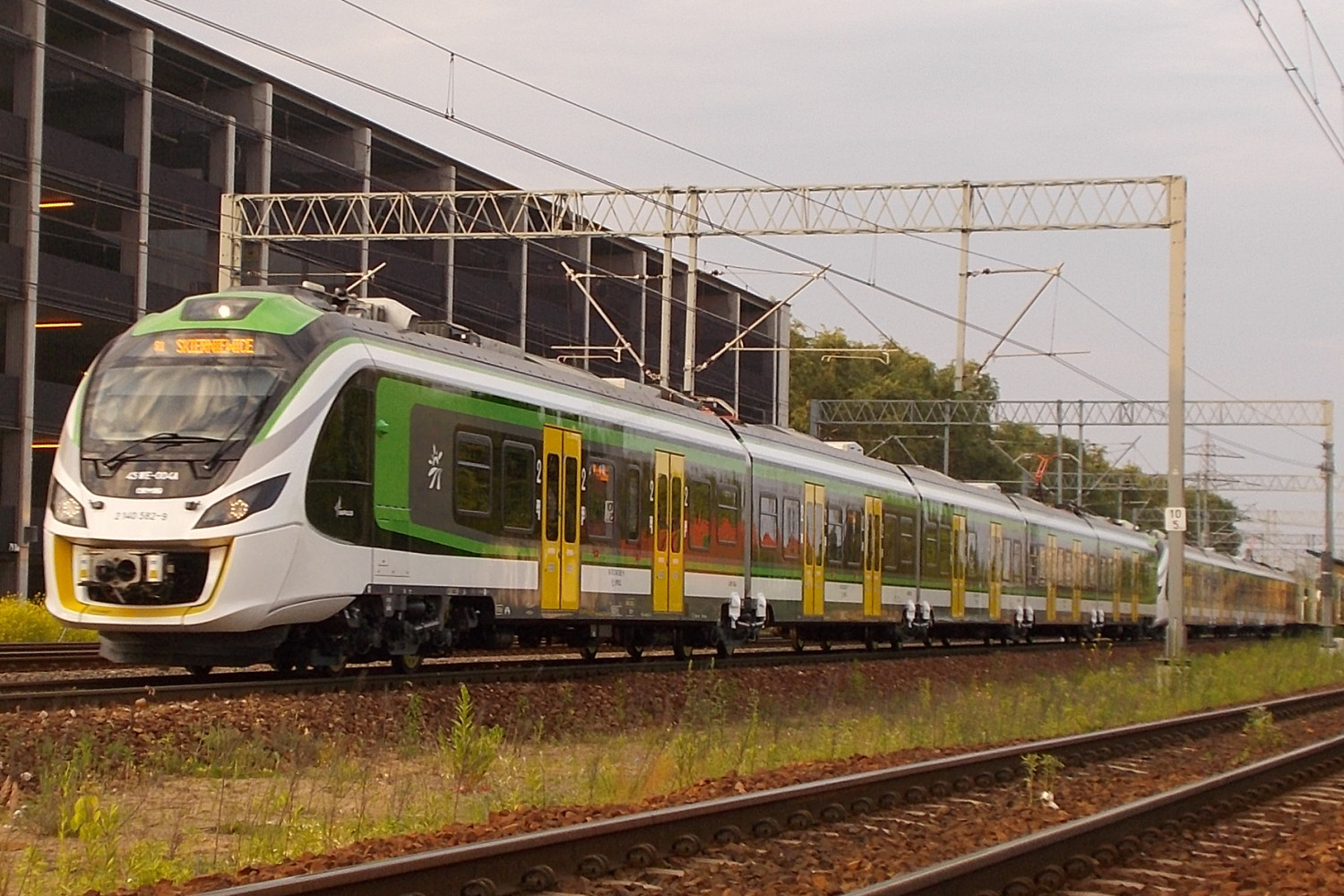
- Masovian Railways Newag Impuls 45WE at Warszawa Ursus-Niedźwiadek in June 2015

Overview
- Status: Operational
- Owner: PKP Polskie Linie Kolejowe
- Line number: PKP 447
- Locale: Masovian Voivodeship, Poland
- Termini: Warszawa Zachodnia; Grodzisk Mazowiecki
- Stations: 10

Service
- Type: Heavy rail
- Operators: Masovian Railways; Rapid Urban Railway

History
- Opened: 9 September 1845
- Electrified: 1936–1937

Technical
- Line length: 28.812 km (17.903 mi)
- Number of tracks: 2
- Track gauge: 1,435 mm (4 ft 8 1/2 in) standard gauge
- Electrification: 3 kV DC, OLE
- Operating speed: 120 km/h (75 mph) maximum

The Warsaw–Grodzisk Mazowiecki railway is an electrified, double-track, 28.8 km (17.9 mi) long railway connecting connecting Warszawa Zachodnia station in Warsaw with Grodzisk Mazowiecki railway station in Grodzisk Mazowiecki, in the Masovian Voivodeship in central Poland.

It originally opened as part of the Warsaw–Vienna railway in 1845. It runs along the Warsaw–Katowice railway; both railways are double-track, subsequently together forming a quadruple-track railway. In addition, the Warsaw Commuter Railway runs parallel south of the line, with the Warszawa Śródmieście WKD–Grodzisk Mazowiecki Radońska railway.

== History ==
The Warsaw–Grodzisk Mazowiecki railway opened on 9 September 1845 originally as part of the Warsaw–Vienna railway. It was electrified between Warszawa Zachodnia and Pruszków on 15 December 1936. The remaining section, between Pruszków and Grodzisk Mazowiecki, was electrified on 22 May 1937.

During the interwar period with the construction of the Warsaw Cross-City Line, it was planned to upgrade the line to four tracks, but delayed the investment due to lack of funding. A second set of tracks was built only in 1959 for the Warsaw–Katowice railway.

== Modernisation ==
In November 2015, PKP Polskie Linie Kolejowe announced a tender for the modernisation of the line on the section between Warszawa Włochy and Grodzisk Mazowiecki. As part of the modernisation, which was to improve movements in the Warsaw metropolitan area, the stations on the line were rebuilt and a new station in Parzniew was built. After completion of the work the line speed increased from 60–80 km/h (37–50 mph) to 120 km/h (75 mph). The works were carried out between 2016–2019.

== Usage ==
The line is used by Masovian Railways and the Rapid Urban Railway (the latter one only between Warsaw and Pruszków).

== See also ==
- Railway lines of Poland
