= Warszawa Ursus Północny railway station =

Railway station in Warsaw, Poland

Warszawa Ursus Północny
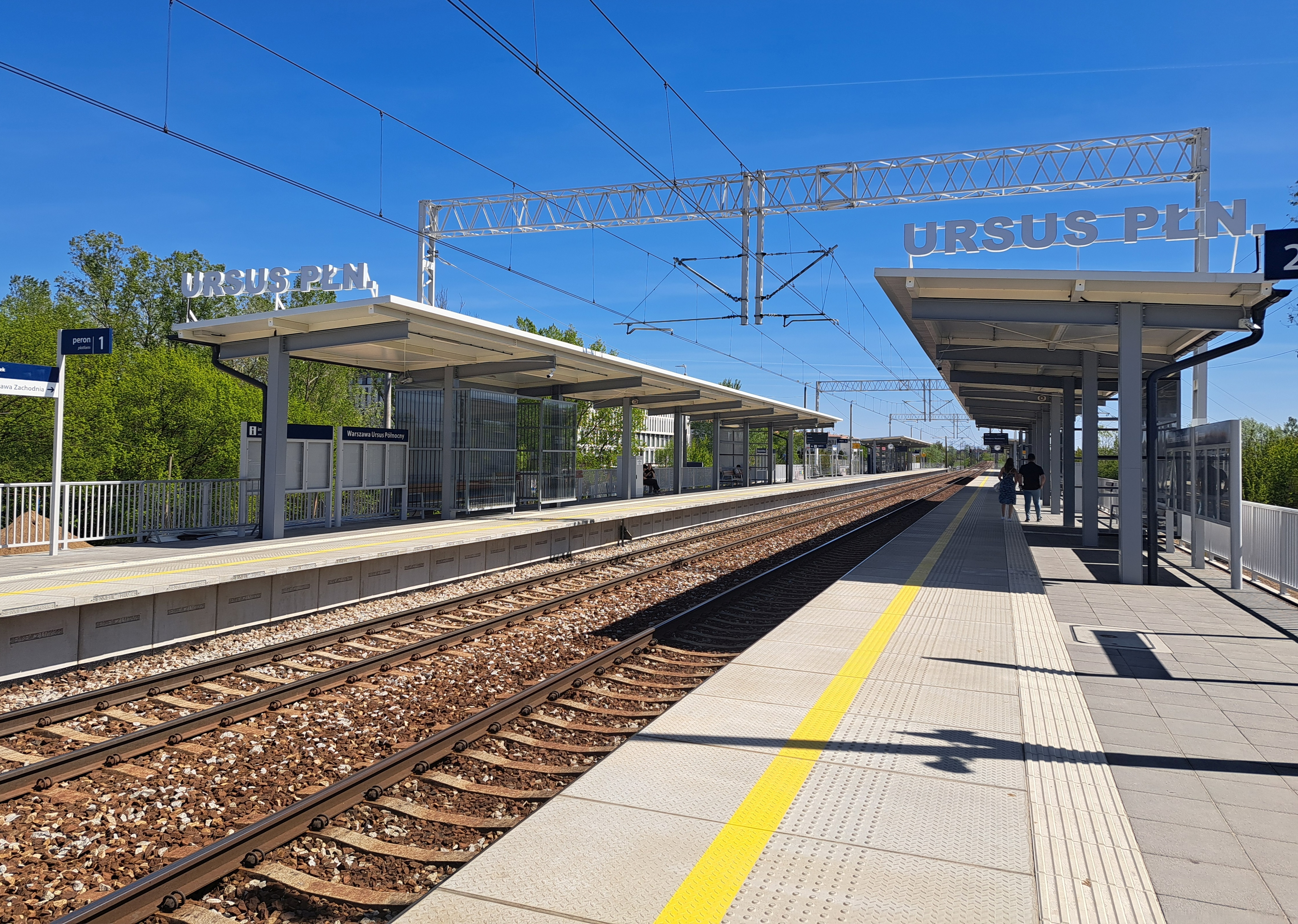

General information
- Location: Ursus, Warsaw, Masovian; Poland
- Coordinates: 52°12′20″N 20°53′23″E
- Owner: Polskie Koleje Państwowe S.A.
- Platforms: 2
- Tracks: 2

Services
| Preceding station | Masovian Railways | Following station |
|---|---|---|
| Warszawa Gołąbki towards Kutno | R3 | Warszawa Włochy towards Warszawa Wschodnia or Warszawa Główna |
Location
- Warszawa Ursus Północny located on the Warsaw Railway Junction

Warszawa Ursus Północny railway station is a railway station in the Ursus district of Warsaw, Poland. The station is served by Masovian Railways, who run trains from Kutno to Warszawa Wschodnia.
