= Łódź Widzew railway station =

Railway station in Łódź, Poland

Coordinates: 51°45′47.4″N 19°32′32.9″E

Łódź Widzew
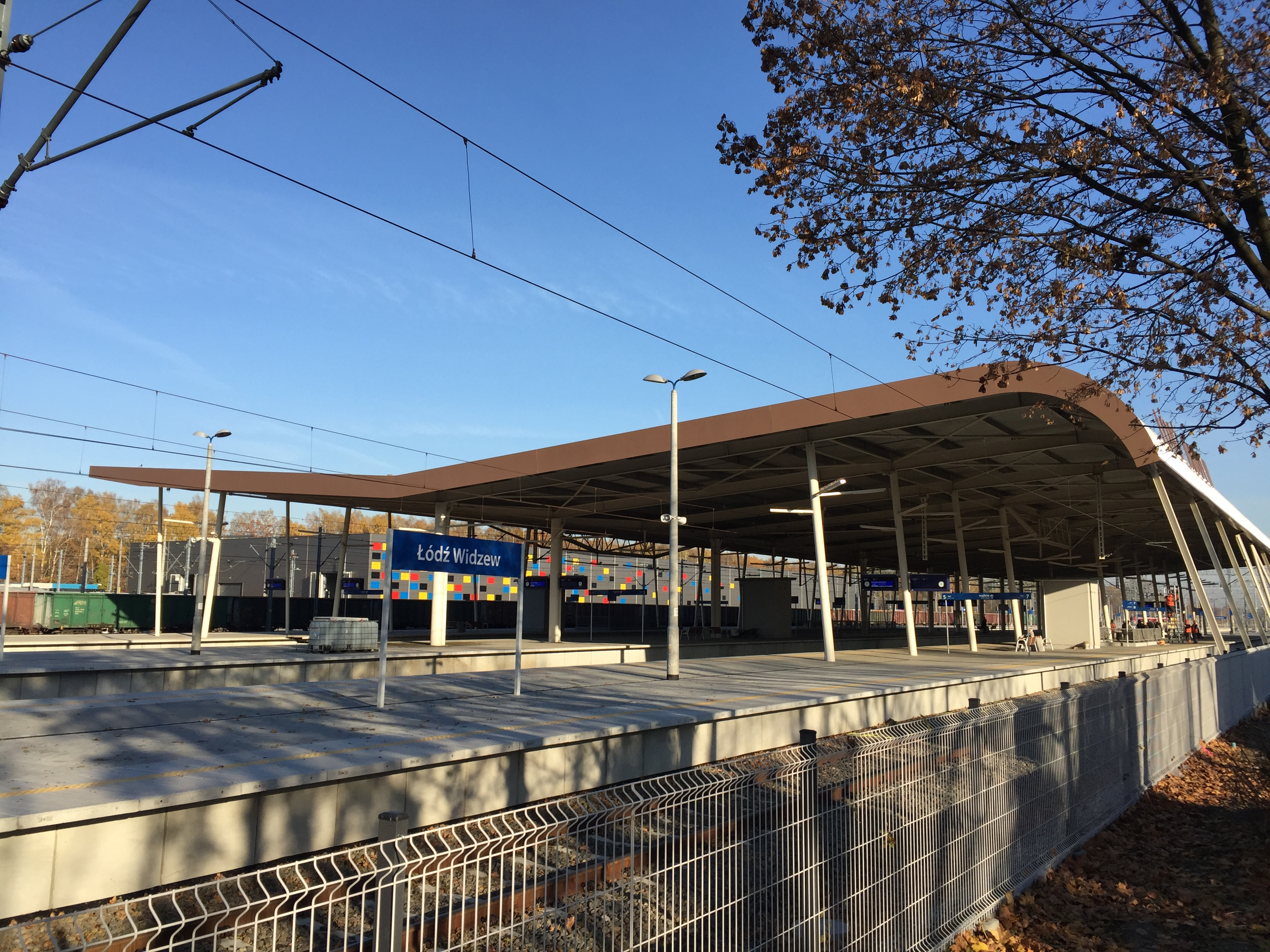
- Łódź Widzew railway station.

General information
- Location: Łódź, Poland
- Owner: Polish State Railways
- Lines: Łódź Cross-City Line; 17 Łódź-Koluszki railway; Łódź Circular Line; 16 Łódź–Kutno railway; 540 to Chojny; 541 to Olechów
- Platforms: 3
- Tracks: 6

Construction
- Parking: yes

History
- Opened: 1901; 125 years ago
- Rebuilt: 2003, 2010, 2012.
- Former names: Widzew (1901-1940); Litzmannstadt Ost (1940-1945)

Passengers
- 2018: 6800
Location

Łódź Widzew is a major railway station located in Widzew, an eastern district in the city of Łódź, Poland. It is located on a number of important railway lines including the Łódź Fabryczna to Koluszki and Warsaw railway line, the Widzew to Kutno railway line, and the Łódź Kaliska to Warsaw line. It consists of three island platforms and six tracks. The station is served by all passing passenger trains, including long distance and local services. Trains departing from the station serve major Polish cities, regional towns in the Łódź Province, and other stations in the Łódź metropolitan area. Operators include PKP Intercity, Polregio, and Łódź Agglomeration Railway (ŁKA). The maintenance depot of Łódź Agglomeration Railway is located at the station.

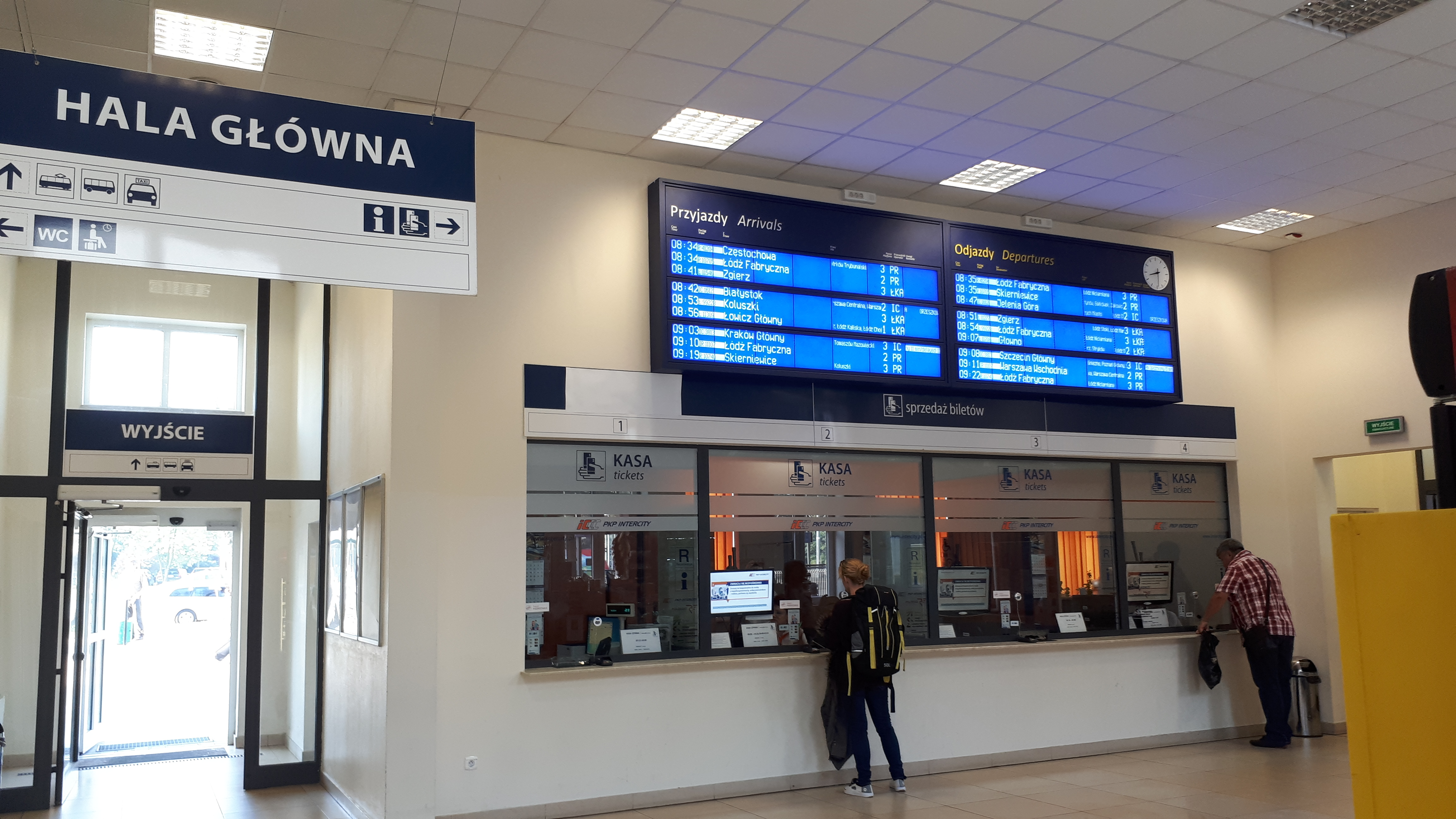
Widzew Railway Station interior

== Public transit ==
The station is served by local bus routes run by city bus operator MPK Łódź:

- Pass-through: W (special shift service to Dąbrowa station), N1A, N1B (night lines from Janów to Teofilów and Aleksandrów Łódzki)
- Terminating: 69A, 69B (from Retkinia), 75A, 75B (from Chocianowice), 75C (from Dąbrowa station), 82A, 82B (from Andrzejów station and Stróża).

The station has a passenger waiting room, ticket counter and car park.

An extension of the tram system to the station is planned. Currently tram lines 3, 9A, 9B, 10A and 10B stop on Rokicińska street near the Rondo Inwalidów roundabout, located around 580 metres (1,900 ft) from the station.

== Train services ==
The station is served by the following services:

- Intercity services (IC) Łódź Fabryczna — Warszawa Główna/Warszawa Wschodnia
- Intercity services (IC) Łódź Fabryczna — Warszawa — Lublin Główny
- Intercity services (IC) Łódź Fabryczna — Warszawa — Gdańsk Glowny — Kołobrzeg
- Intercity services (IC) Łódź Fabryczna — Bydgoszcz — Gdynia Główna
- Intercity services (IC) Łódź Fabryczna — Tomaszów Mazowiecki/Częstochowa — Kraków Główny
- Intercity services (IC) Gdynia - Gdańsk - Bydgoszcz - Toruń - Kutno - Łódź - Częstochowa - Katowice - Bielsko-Biała
- Intercity services (IC) Wrocław Główny — Łódź — Warszawa Wschodnia
- Intercity services (IC) Zgorzelec - Legnica - Wrocław - Ostrów Wielkopolski - Łódź - Warszawa
- Intercity services (IC) Białystok - Warszawa - Łódź - Ostrów Wielkopolski - Wrocław
- Intercity services (IC) Ełk - Białystok - Warszawa - Łódź - Ostrów Wielkopolski - Wrocław
- Intercity services (TLK) Gdynia Główna — Bydgoszcz/Grudziądz — Łódź — Katowice
- InterRegio services (IR) Łódź Fabryczna — Warszawa Glowna
- InterRegio services (IR) Łódź Kaliska — Warszawa Glowna
- InterRegio services (IR) Ostrów Wielkopolski — Łódź — Warszawa Główna
- InterRegio services (IR) Poznań Główny — Ostrów Wielkopolski — Łódź — Warszawa Główna
- Regional services (PR) Łódź Fabryczna — Częstochowa
- Regional services (PR) Łódź Kaliska — Częstochowa
- Regional services (PR) Łódź Kaliska — Skarżysko-Kamienna

Preceding station	PKP Intercity	Following station
Koluszki towards Warszawa Główna or Warszawa Wschodnia	IC	Łódź Fabryczna Terminus
Koluszki towards Lublin Główny	IC	Łódź Fabryczna Terminus
Koluszki towards Kołobrzeg	IC	Łódź Fabryczna Terminus
Łódź Chojny towards Gdynia Główna	IC	Łódź Fabryczna Terminus
Tomaszów Mazowiecki towards Kraków Główny	IC Via Tomaszów Mazowiecki	Łódź Fabryczna Terminus
Piotrków Trybunalski towards Kraków Główny	IC Via Częstochowa	Łódź Fabryczna Terminus
Łódź Chojny towards Gdynia Główna	IC	Piotrków Trybunalski towards Bielsko-Biała Główna
Koluszki towards Warszawa Wschodnia	IC Via Łódź	Łódź Chojny towards Wrocław Główny
Koluszki towards Białystok	IC Via Łódź	Łódź Chojny towards Wrocław Główny
Koluszki towards Ełk	IC	Łódź Chojny towards Wrocław Główny
Koluszki towards Warszawa Wschodnia	IC	Łódź Chojny towards Zgorzelec
Piotrków Trybunalski towards Katowice	TLK	Łódź Chojny towards Gdynia Główna
Preceding station	Polregio	Following station
Łódź Niciarniana towards Łódź Fabryczna	IR	Łódź Andrzejów towards Warszawa Główna
Łódź Niciarniana towards Łódź Fabryczna	IR [Łódź Fabryczna - Warszawa Główna] (Going to Łódź Fabryczna and reversing back)	Łódź Andrzejów towards Warszawa Główna
Łódź Niciarniana towards Łódź Fabryczna	IR [Łódź Fabryczna - Warszawa Główna] (Going to Łódź Fabryczna and reversing back)	Łódź Dąbrowa towards Łódź Kaliska
Łódź Dąbrowa towards Ostrów Wielkopolski or Poznań Główny	IR	Łódź Andrzejów towards Warszawa Główna
Łódź Dąbrowa towards Łódź Kaliska	PR	Łódź Andrzejów towards Skarżysko-Kamienna
Łódź Niciarniana towards Łódź Fabryczna	PR	Łódź Andrzejów towards Częstochowa
Łódź Niciarniana towards Łódź Fabryczna	PR [Łódź Kaliska - Częstochowa] (Going to Łódź Fabryczna and reversing back)	Łódź Andrzejów Szosa towards Łódź Kaliska
Łódź Niciarniana towards Łódź Fabryczna	PR [Łódź Kaliska - Częstochowa] (Going to Łódź Fabryczna and reversing back)	Łódź Andrzejów towards Częstochowa
Preceding station	ŁKA	Following station
Terminus	Łódź - Toruń	Łódź Dąbrowa towards Toruń Wschodni
Terminus	Łódź - Łowicz	Łódź Dąbrowa towards Łowicz Główny
Łódź Niciarniana towards Łódź Fabryczna	Łódź Widzew - Łódź Kaliska - Zgierz	Łódź Dąbrowa towards Zgierz
Łódź Niciarniana towards Łódź Fabryczna	Łódź Widzew - Łódź Kaliska - Zgierz	Łódź Andrzejów Szosa towards Zgierz
Łódź Niciarniana towards Łódź Fabryczna	Łódź Widzew - Zgierz via Stoki	Łódź Stoki towards Zgierz
Łódź Niciarniana towards Łódź Fabryczna	Łódź - Skierniewice	Łódź Andrzejów towards Skierniewice
Łódź Niciarniana towards Łódź Fabryczna	Łódź - Warsaw	Koluszki towards Warszawa Główna or Warszawa Wschodnia
Łódź Niciarniana towards Łódź Fabryczna	Łódź - Radom	Łódź Andrzejów towards Radom
Łódź Niciarniana towards Łódź Fabryczna	Łódź - Skarżysko-Kamienna	Łódź Andrzejów towards Skarżysko-Kamienna
Łódź Niciarniana towards Łódź Fabryczna	Łódź - Radomsko	Łódź Andrzejów towards Radomsko
Terminus	Łódź - Sieradz	Łódź Dąbrowa towards Sieradz
Łódź Niciarniana towards Łódź Fabryczna	Łódź - Poznań (jointly operated with Greater Poland Railways)	Łódź Dąbrowa towards Poznań Główny
