= Warszawa Ursus railway station =

Railway station in Warsaw, Poland

Warszawa Ursus

General information
- Location: Ursus, Warsaw, Masovian; Poland
- Coordinates: 52°11′46″N 20°53′05″E
- Owner: Polskie Koleje Państwowe S.A.
- Platforms: 2
- Tracks: 3

History
- Former names: Ursus

Services
Preceding station	Masovian Railways	Following station
Warszawa Ursus Niedźwiadek towards Skierniewice	R1	Warszawa Włochy towards Warszawa Wschodnia or Warszawa Główna
Preceding station	SKM Warsaw	Following station
Warszawa Ursus Niedźwiadek towards Pruszków	S1	Warszawa Włochy towards Otwock or Warszawa Główna
Location
- Warszawa Ursus located on the Warsaw Railway Junction

Warszawa Ursus railway station is a railway station in the Ursus district of Warsaw, Poland. The station is served by Masovian Railways, who run trains from Skierniewice to Warszawa Wschodnia, and Rapid Urban Railway (Warsaw), who run trains from Pruszków PKP to Otwock. The station was opened in 1926 as Ursus. It was changed to its current name in 1977 when Ursus became part of Warsaw.
