= Warszawa Włochy railway station =

Railway station in Warsaw, Poland

Warszawa Włochy
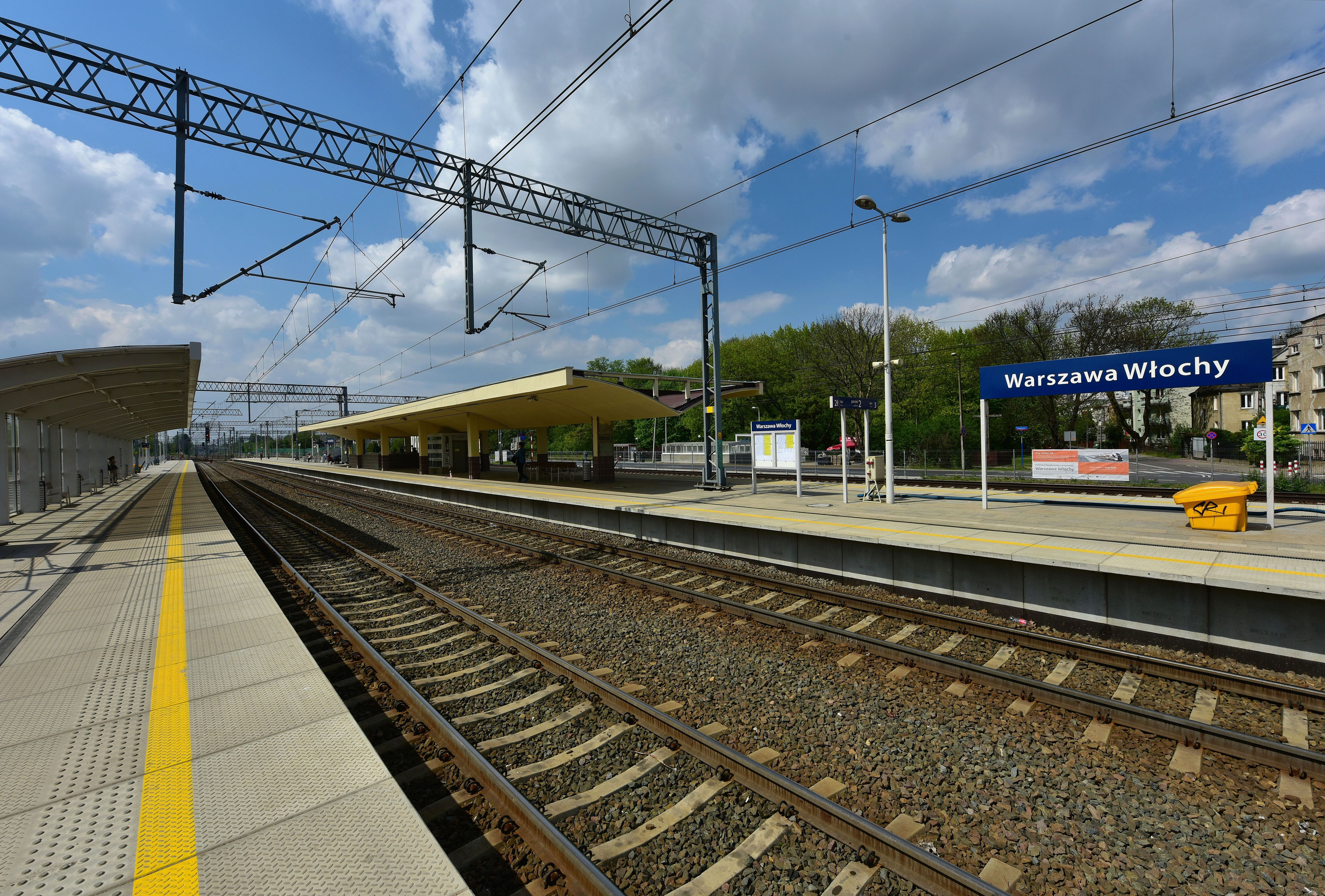

General information
- Location: Włochy, Warsaw, Masovian; Poland
- Coordinates: 52°12′22″N 20°54′55″E
- Owner: Polskie Koleje Państwowe S.A.
- Platforms: 2
- Tracks: 3
- Connections: Bus lines 127, 129, 178, 189, 191, 194, 228

Construction
- Architectural style: Modernist

History
- Rebuilt: early 1970s, 2019
- Former names: Warszawa Włochy EKD, Warszawa Włochy WKD

Passengers
- 3600+ daily

Services
Preceding station	Masovian Railways	Following station
Warszawa Ursus towards Skierniewice	R1	Warszawa Zachodnia towards Warszawa Wschodnia or Warszawa Główna
Warszawa Ursus towards Grodzisk Mazowiecki	R2	Warszawa Zachodnia towards Siedlce
Warszawa Ursus Północny towards Łowicz Główny	R3	Warszawa Zachodnia towards Warszawa Wschodnia or Warszawa Główna
Warszawa Ursus Północny towards Sochaczew	R7	Warszawa Zachodnia towards Celestynów
Preceding station	SKM Warsaw	Following station
Warszawa Ursus towards Pruszków	S1	Warszawa Zachodnia towards Otwock or Warszawa Główna
Location
- Warszawa Włochy located on the Warsaw Railway Junction

Warszawa Włochy railway station is a railway station in the Włochy district of Warsaw, Poland. It stands on the junction of lines 1 and 3: from here trains can either run on Line 1 towards Łódź or Line 3 towards Poznań. It comprises two platforms connected by an underground pedestrian tunnel and a station building complete with ticket machines and bicycle parking.

== History ==
The exact opening date is not known, but a railway connection was present in this area since at least 1845 with the construction of the Warsaw–Vienna railway. In 1932 the company "Siła i Światło" (eng. Strength and Light) extended EKD (Elektryczna Kolej Dojazdowa - eng. Electric Commuter Railway) - a light rail line connecting Warsaw to Grodzisk Mazowiecki with a branch to Włochy, then a satellite city of Warsaw. The branch followed Popularna Street and terminated around the location of the modern station, where a waiting hall, pedestrian tunnel and ticket offices were built. The railway was critical in the development of industry around Włochy, which included extensive clay mining and brick production, as well as supplying workers to the Ursus factories to the west.

The line continued to operate until September 1939 when it was significantly damaged by the german forces, but resumed operation before 1940. After the fall of the Warsaw Uprising the line was used by Nazis to transfer prisoners to the Dulag 121 camp in Pruszków, although it was made difficult as transports were routinely sabotaged by workers. During the german retreat of 1945 the railway was again made inoperational by the occupying forces.

After the war the railway was repaired and begun service again in April 1945, largely using rolling stock leased from PKP and MZK. With a lack of funds and placement under "special observation" by communists the operator wasn't able to fully rebuild and was nationalized in 1947 under the name Warszawska Kolej Dojazdowa, which operates to this day. A new Warszawa Włochy PKP station was established around that time

In 1962 the WKD Włochy terminus station was closed and began to serve as a temporary building for the Polish State Railways. It was made permanent and completely rebuilt in the present configuration somewhere in the early 1970s during a major rework of the Warsaw Railway Node. It remained in that state until 2017, when it was renovated as part of the railway line 447 modernisation. During the renovation a new passenger information system was installed, the platforms lowered and repaved with new lifts connecting them to the pedestrian tunnel and a glass shelter erected on platform 1. Remnants of a 1950's era Schedule and platform markings were also unearthed and are planned to be exposed as museum pieces on the station.

== Modern day ==
Today the station serves the neighborhoods of Old Włochy and New Włochy, and provides convenient transit to the city center and the rest of the Warsaw Agglomeration. The station is served by the regional Masovian Railways with trains to Skierniewice, Grodzisk Mazowiecki, Siedlce, Łowicz, Sochaczew and Celestynów. And the municipal Rapid Urban Rail (SKM) which runs towards Pruszków and Otwock. Approx. 220 trains stop at the station transporting over 3600 passengers per day (data for 2022).
