= Piastów railway station =

Railway station in Piastów, Poland

Piastów

General information
- Location: Piastów, Masovian; Poland
- Coordinates: 52°11′38″N 20°51′28″E
- Owner: Polskie Koleje Państwowe S.A.
- Platforms: 2
- Tracks: 2

History
- Former names: Utrata

Services
Preceding station	Masovian Railways	Following station
Pruszków towards Skierniewice	R1	Warszawa Ursus Niedźwiadek towards Warszawa Wschodnia or Warszawa Główna
Preceding station	SKM Warsaw	Following station
Pruszków Terminus	S1	Warszawa Ursus Niedźwiadek towards Otwock or Warszawa Główna
Location

Piastów railway station is a railway station in Piastów, Poland. The station is served by Masovian Railways, who run trains from Skierniewice to Warszawa Wschodnia, and Rapid Urban Railway (Warsaw), who run trains on line S1 from Pruszków PKP to Otwock.

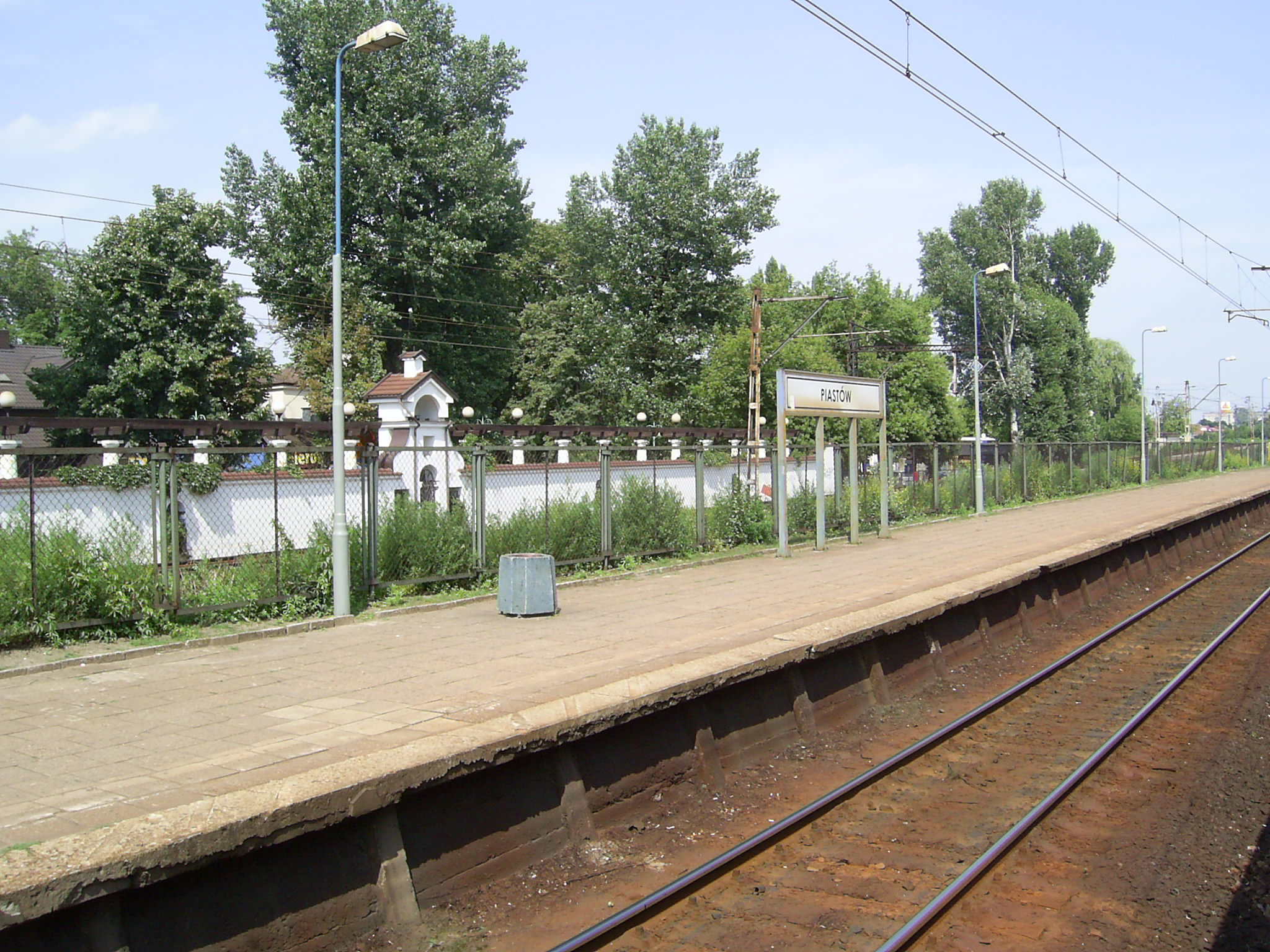
Piastów railway station
