= Piastów =

Town in Masovian Voivodeship, Poland

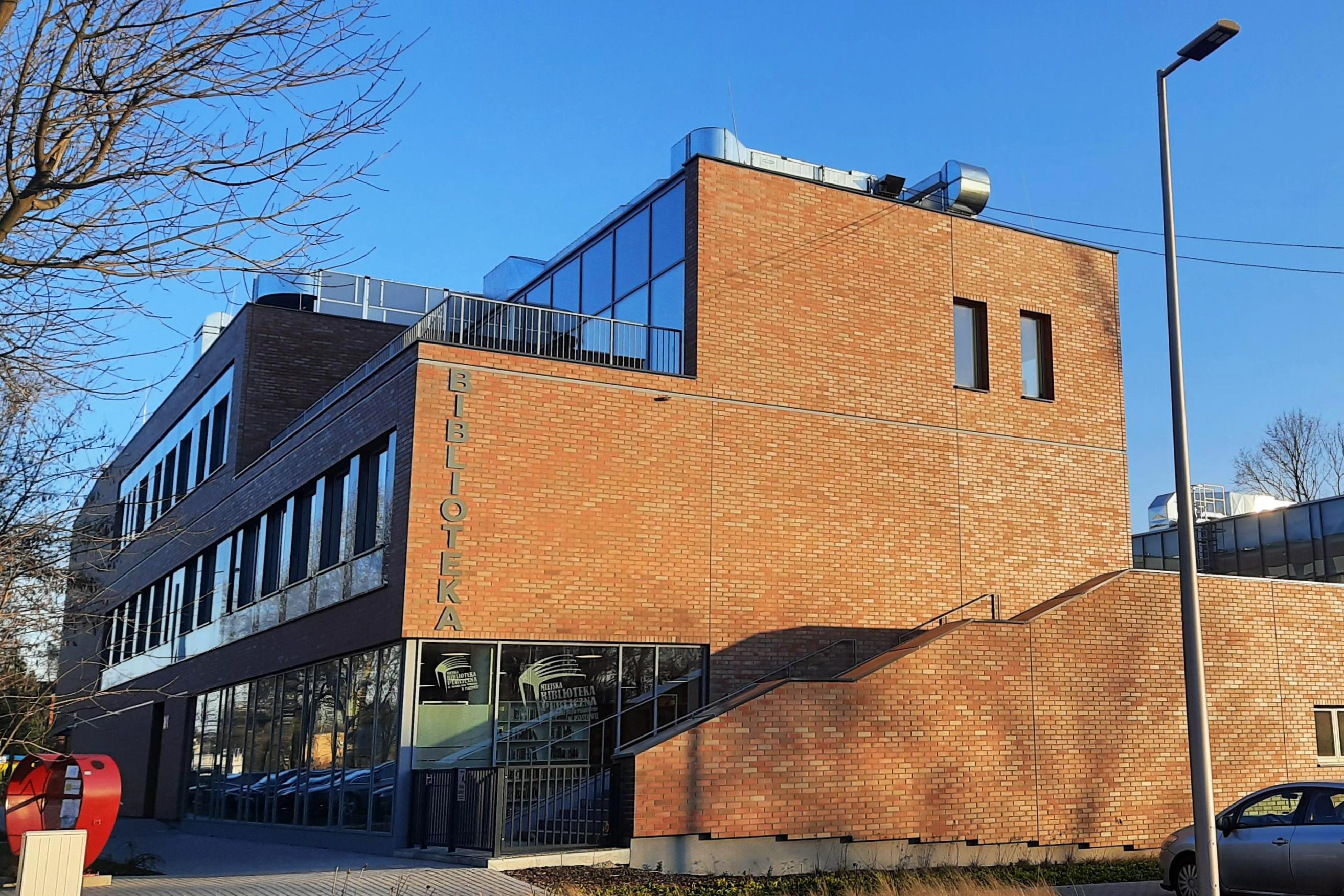
- Municipal Public Library in Piastów

- Coat of arms

- Location within Poland
- Coordinates: 52°11′N 20°51′E
- Country: Poland
- Voivodeship: Masovian
- County: Pruszków
- Gmina: Piastów (urban gmina)
- Established: 16th century as Żdżary
- Town rights: 1952

Government
  - Mayor: Tomasz Krzysztof Jankowski

Area
  - City: 5.83 km^{2} (2.25 sq mi)
  - Urban: 5.76 km^{2} (2.22 sq mi)

Population (2014)
  - City: 22,826
  - Density: 3,920/km^{2} (10,100/sq mi)
  - Urban: 22,826
  - Urban density: 4,050.5/km^{2} (10,491/sq mi)
- Time zone: UTC+1 (CET)
  - Summer (DST): UTC+2 (CEST)
- Postal code: 05-820
- Area code: +48 22
- Car plates: WPR
- Website: http://piastow.pl/

Piastów [ˈpʲastuf] is a town in central Poland in the Masovian Voivodeship, within the Warsaw metropolitan area, with 23,331 inhabitants (2006 est). With 3963 persons/km², it is the second most densely populated township in Poland (after Świętochłowice).

== History ==
In the Middle Ages, the villages of Żdżary and Utrata existed in the place of today's Piastów.

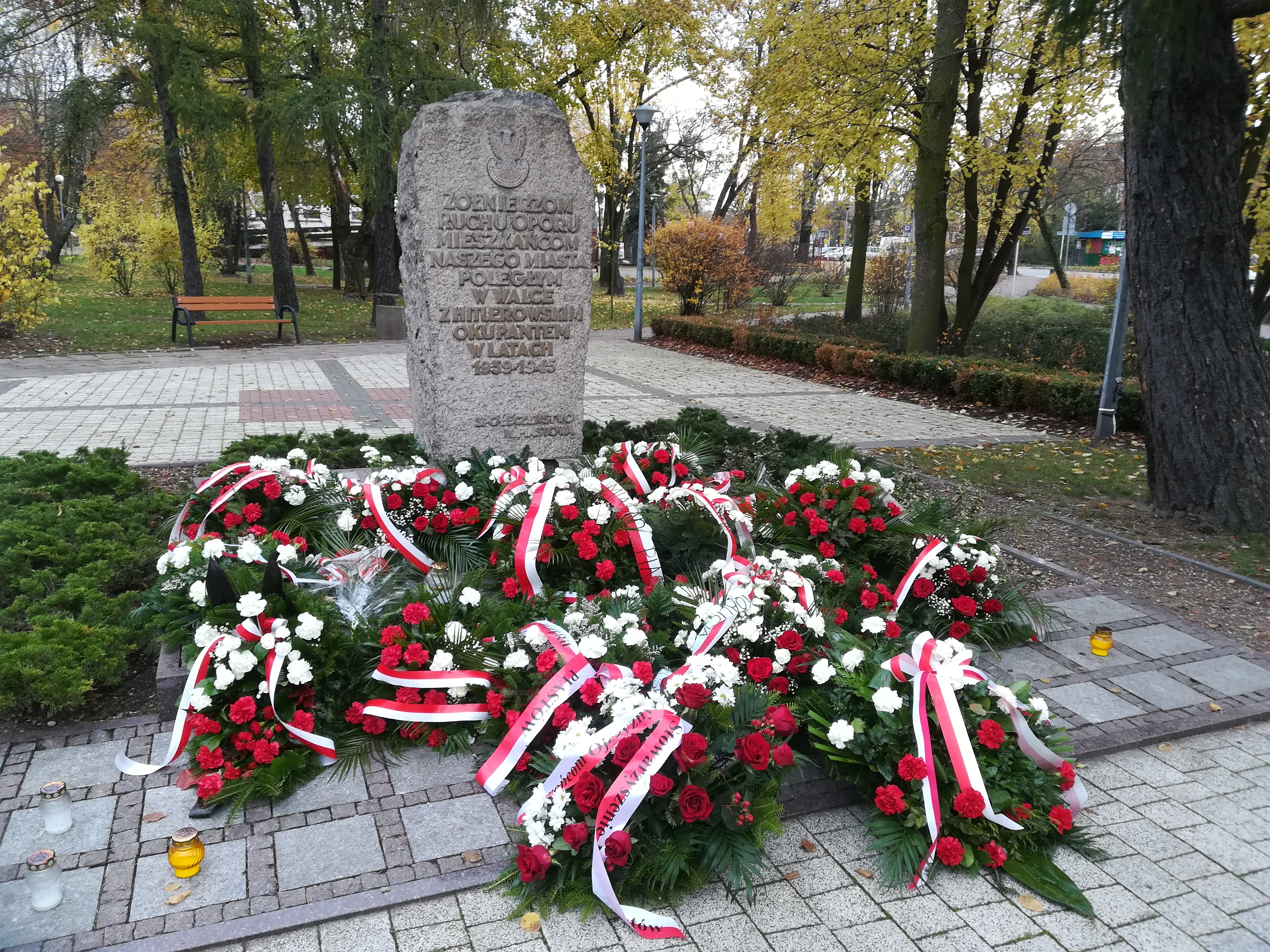
Memorial to soldiers of the resistance movement killed in the fight against the Nazi occupiers

Following the joint German-Soviet invasion of Poland, which started World War II in September 1939, Piastów was occupied by Germany until January 1945. In early 1940, 100 expelled Poles from Poznań were deported to Piastów. The local branch of the Polish Red Cross looked after Polish displaced persons, treated the wounded, organised food parcels for local Poles held in German prisoner-of-war camps and conducted secret sanitary and rescue training. The last pre-war chief of the Piastów police station was murdered by the Russians in Tver in the Katyn massacre in 1940. The Polish resistance movement was present in Piastów, and its activities included sabotage of industrial production and distribution of Polish underground press. During the Warsaw Uprising, in August 1944, Poles expelled by the Germans from Wola came to Piastów. From October 1944 to March 1945, the Poles ran an infectious disease hospital where Polish refugees from Warsaw and Jews hid, as the Germans were afraid to enter the hospital.

From 1975 to 1998, it was administratively located in the Warsaw Voivodship.

== Sights ==
There are several memorials to victims and partisans of World War II.

== Transport ==
Piastów is served by Piastów railway station.

Piastów is supported by the Warsaw ZTM system with 2 lines: 716 and 717.

716: Warsaw: Cmentarz Wolski – Fort Wola – Wolska – Połczyńska – Gierdziejewskiego – Jagiełły – Warszawska – Keniga – Orląt Lwowskich – Warszawska – Piastów: Warszawska – al. Wojska Polskiego – Sowińskiego – Ogińskiego

717: Warsaw: Dw. Zachodni – Aleje Jerozolimskie – Michałowice: Aleje Jerozolimskie – Piastów: Al. Tysiąclecia – Al. Wojska Polskiego – Sowińskiego – Ogińskiego
