= Warszawa Ursus-Niedźwiadek railway station =

Railway station in Warsaw, Poland

Warszawa Ursus Niedźwiadek
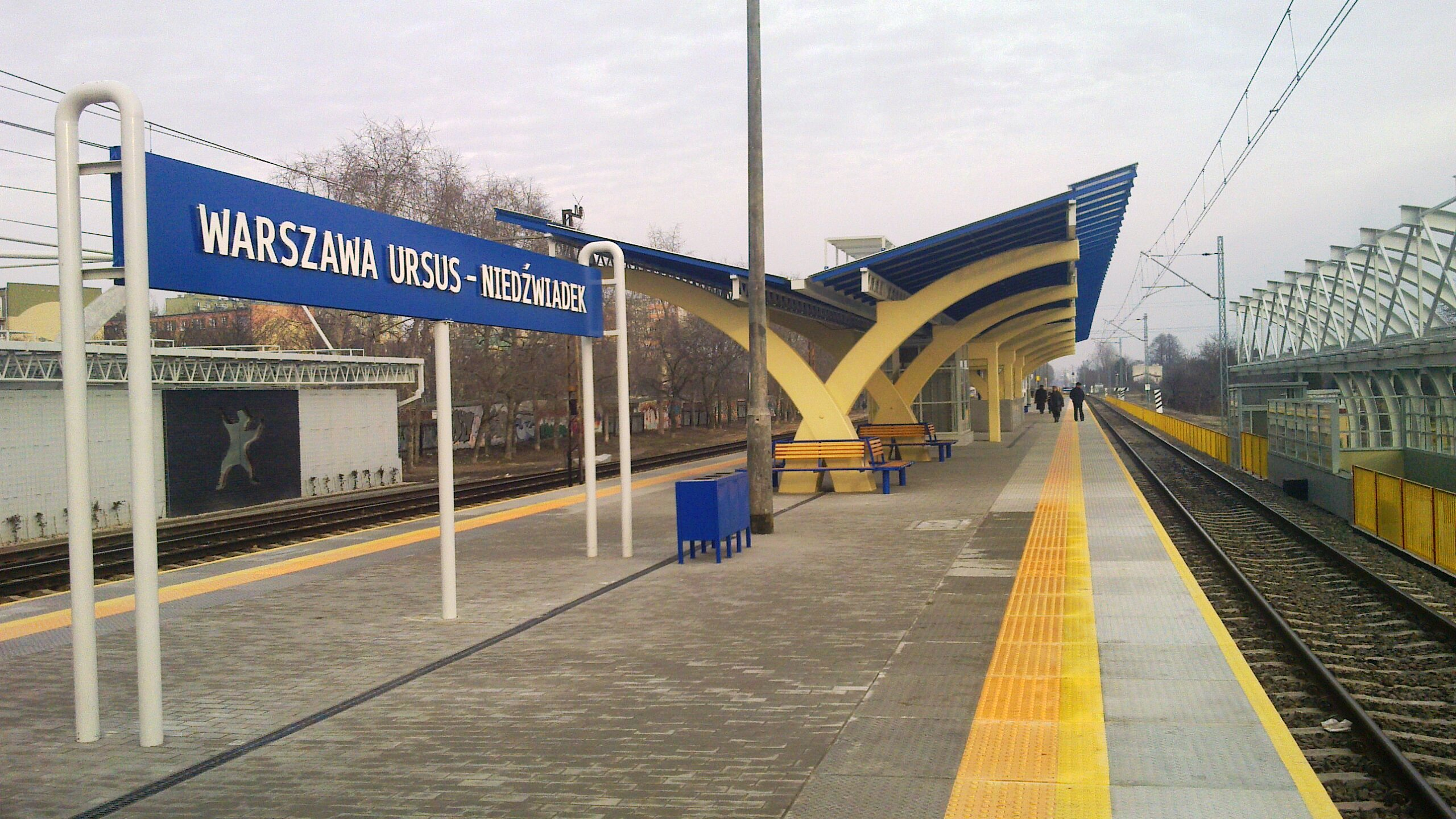

General information
- Location: Ursus, Warsaw, Masovian; Poland
- Coordinates: 52.19132°N 20.8696007°E
- Owner: Polskie Koleje Państwowe S.A.

Services
Preceding station	Masovian Railways	Following station
Piastów towards Skierniewice	R1	Warszawa Ursus towards Warszawa Wschodnia or Warszawa Główna
Preceding station	SKM Warsaw	Following station
Piastów towards Pruszków	S1	Warszawa Ursus towards Otwock or Warszawa Główna
Location
- Warszawa Ursus–Niedźwiadek located on the Warsaw Railway Junction

Warszawa Ursus–Niedźwiadek railway station is a railway station in the Ursus district of Warsaw, Poland. The station is served by Masovian Railways, which runs trains from Skierniewice to Warszawa Wschodnia, and Rapid Urban Railway (Warsaw), which runs trains from Pruszków PKP to Otwock.
