= Koluszki railway station =

Railway station in Łódź, Poland

Koluszki
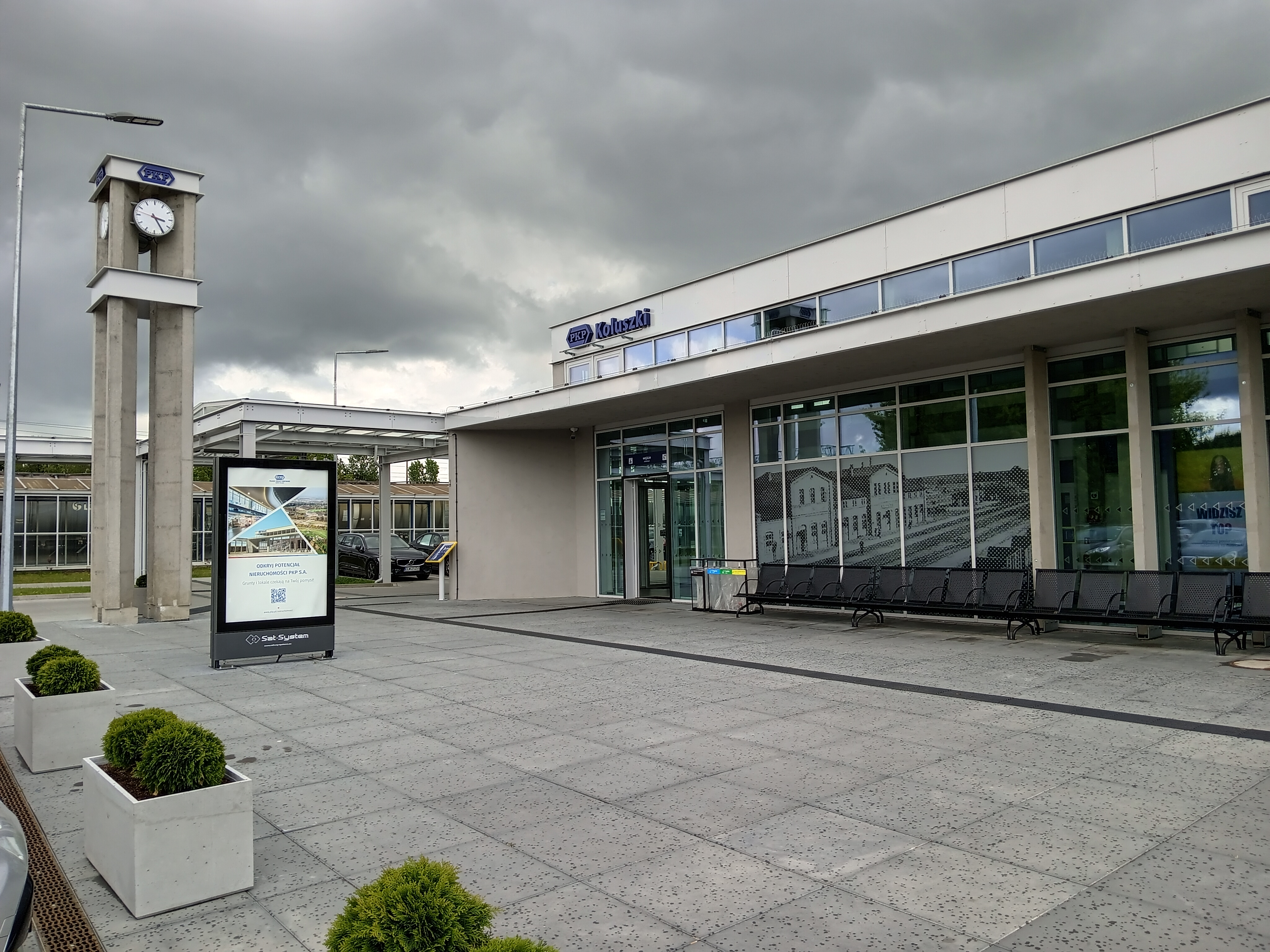
- Station building at Koluszki railway station (2025)

General information
- Location: Koluszki, Łódź; Poland
- Coordinates: 51.7446054°N 19.8167944°E
- Owner: Polskie Koleje Państwowe S.A.
- Lines: 1: Warszawa Zachodnia – Katowice; 17: Łódź Fabryczna – Koluszki; 534; Koluszki – Mikołajów; 535: Zieleń – Koluszki; Wykno – Koluszki
- Platforms: 3
- Tracks: 6

Construction
- Structure type: Building: Yes

History
- Opened: 1846
Location

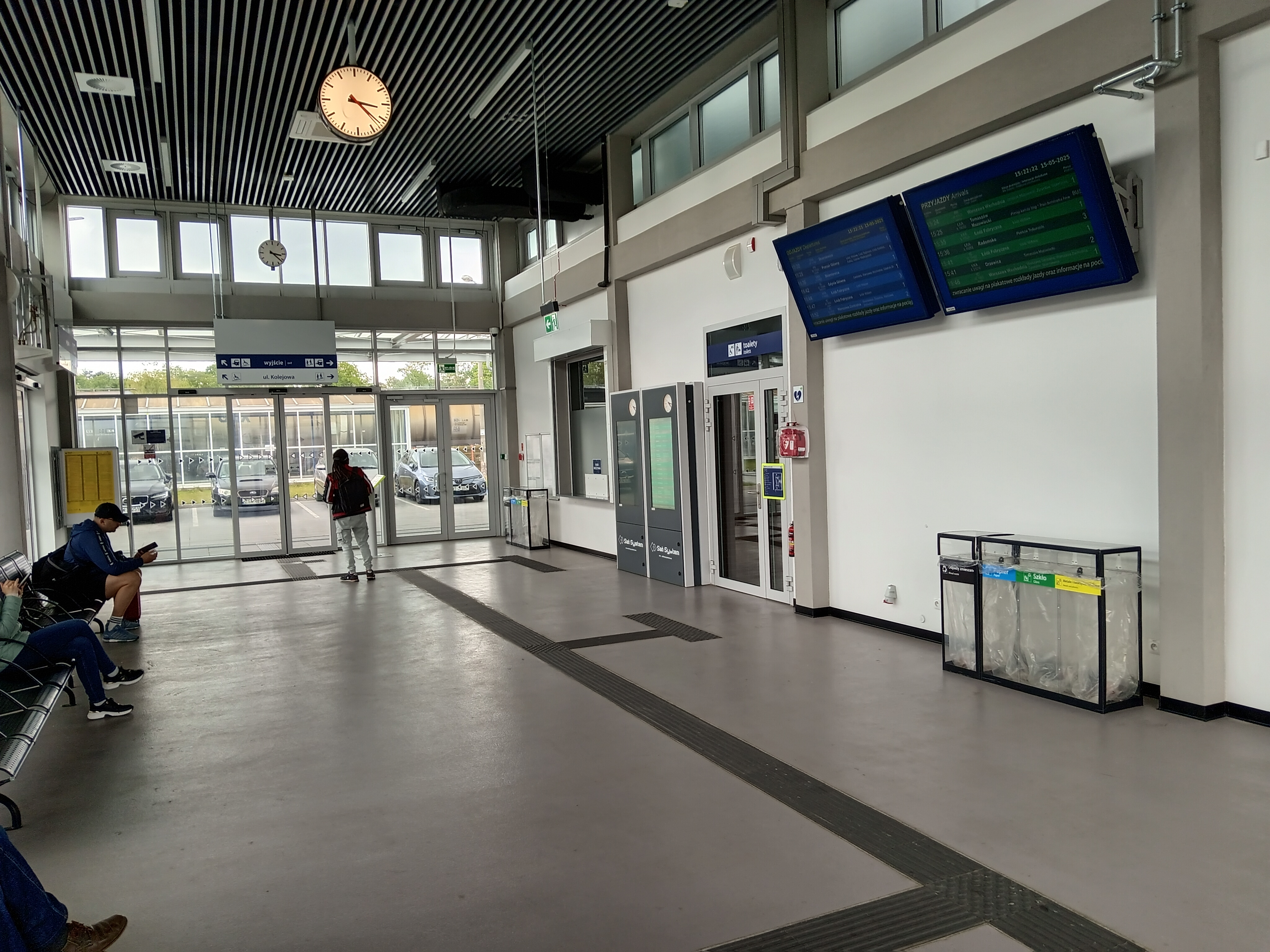
Inside the railway station

Koluszki railway station is a railway station in Koluszki, Łódź Voivodeship, Poland. As of 2022, it is served by Łódź Agglomeration Railway (Lodz Metropolitan Railway), Polregio (Polregio) and PKP Intercity (EIP, InterCity, and TLK services).

In 2025, the old building of railway station between the platforms was demolished and the passenger waiting room was moved to a smaller building outside the platforms on the edge of the station. The investment in the construction of the new building railway station cost PLN 13 million.

== Train services ==
The station is served by the following services:

- Intercity services (IC) Łódź Fabryczna — Warszawa Główna/Warszawa Wschodnia
- Intercity services (IC) Łódź Fabryczna — Warszawa — Lublin Główny
- Intercity services (IC) Łódź Fabryczna — Warszawa — Gdańsk Glowny — Kołobrzeg
- Intercity services (IC) Wrocław- Opole - Częstochowa - Warszawa
- Intercity services (IC) Wrocław - Ostrów Wielkopolski - Łódź - Warszawa
- Intercity services (IC) Zgorzelec - Legnica - Wrocław - Ostrów Wielkopolski - Łódź - Warszawa
- Intercity services (IC) Białystok - Warszawa - Częstochowa - Opole - Wrocław
- Intercity services (IC) Białystok - Warszawa - Łódź - Ostrów Wielkopolski - Wrocław
- Intercity services (IC) Ełk - Białystok - Warszawa - Łódź - Ostrów Wielkopolski - Wrocław
- Intercity services (IC) Warszawa - Częstochowa - Katowice - Bielsko-Biała
- Intercity services (IC) Białystok - Warszawa - Częstochowa - Katowice - Bielsko-Biała
- Intercity services (IC) Olsztyn - Warszawa - Skierniewice - Łódź
- Intercity services (IC) Olsztyn - Warszawa - Skierniewice - Częstochowa - Katowice - Bielsko-Biała
- Intercity services (IC) Olsztyn - Warszawa - Skierniewice - Częstochowa - Katowice - Gliwice - Racibórz
- Intercity services (TLK) Warszawa - Częstochowa - Lubliniec - Opole - Wrocław - Szklarska Poręba Górna
- Intercity services (TLK) Gdynia Główna — Kostrzyn
- Intercity services (TLK) Gdynia Główna — Warszawa — Krakow — Zakopane
- InterRegio services (IR) Łódź Fabryczna — Warszawa Glowna
- InterRegio services (IR) Łódź Kaliska — Warszawa Glowna
- Regional services (PR) Łódź Fabryczna — Częstochowa
- Regional services (PR) Łódź Kaliska — Częstochowa
- Regional services (PR) Łódź Kaliska — Skarżysko-Kamienna
- Regional services (ŁKA) Łódz - Skierniewice
- Regional services (ŁKA) Łódz - Warsaw
- Regional services (ŁKA) Łódz - Tomaszów Mazowiecki - Radom
- Regional services (ŁKA) Łódz - Tomaszów Mazowiecki - Skarżysko-Kamienna
- Regional services (ŁKA) Łódz - Radomosko

Preceding station	PKP Intercity	Following station
Skierniewice towards Warszawa Główna or Warszawa Wschodnia	IC	Łódź Widzew towards Łódź Fabryczna
Skierniewice towards Lublin Główny	IC	Łódź Widzew towards Łódź Fabryczna
Skierniewice towards Kołobrzeg	IC	Łódź Widzew towards Łódź Fabryczna
Skierniewice towards Warszawa Gdańska or Warszawa Wschodnia	IC Via Łódź	Łódź Widzew towards Wrocław Główny
Skierniewice towards Warszawa Gdańska or Warszawa Wschodnia	IC Via Częstochowa	Piotrków Trybunalski towards Wrocław Główny
Skierniewice towards Białystok	IC Via Częstochowa	Piotrków Trybunalski towards Wrocław Główny
Skierniewice towards Białystok	IC Via Łódź	Łódź Widzew towards Wrocław Główny
Skierniewice towards Ełk	IC	Łódź Widzew towards Wrocław Główny
Skierniewice towards Warszawa Wschodnia or Białystok	IC	Piotrków Trybunalski towards Bielsko-Biała Główna
Skierniewice towards Warszawa Wschodnia	IC	Łódź Widzew towards Zgorzelec
Łódź Widzew towards Łódź Fabryczna	IC	Skierniewice towards Olsztyn Główny
Piotrków Trybunalski towards Bielsko-Biała Główna or Racibórz	IC	Skierniewice towards Olsztyn Główny
Piotrków Trybunalski towards Szklarska Poręba Górna	TLK via Lubliniec	Skierniewice towards Warszawa Wschodnia
Skierniewice towards Gdynia Główna	TLK via Częstochowa	Piotrków Trybunalski towards Zakopane
Skierniewice towards Gdynia Główna	TLK via Tomaszów Mazowiecki	Tomaszów Mazowiecki towards Zakopane
Preceding station	Polregio	Following station
Łódź Andrzejów towards Łódź Fabryczna	IR	Rogów towards Warszawa Główna
Łódź Andrzejów towards Łódź Kaliska, Ostrów Wielkopolski or Poznań Główny	IR	Rogów towards Warszawa
Żakowice towards Łódź Fabryczna or Łódź Kaliska	PR	Chrusty Nowe towards Częstochowa
Żakowice towards Łódź Kaliska	PR	Słotwiny towards Skarżysko-Kamienna
Preceding station	ŁKA	Following station
Żakowice towards Łódź Fabryczna	Łódź - Skierniewice	Wągry towards Skierniewice
Łódź Widzew towards Łódź Fabryczna	Łódź - Warsaw	Rogów towards Warszawa Główna or Warszawa Wschodnia
Żakowice towards Łódź Fabryczna	Łódź - Radom	Słotwiny towards Radom
Żakowice towards Łódź Fabryczna	Łódź - Skarżysko-Kamienna	Słotwiny towards Skarżysko-Kamienna
Żakowice towards Łódź Fabryczna	Łódź - Radomsko	Chrusty Nowe towards Radomsko
