= Ursus, Warsaw =

Ursus
- Warsaw District
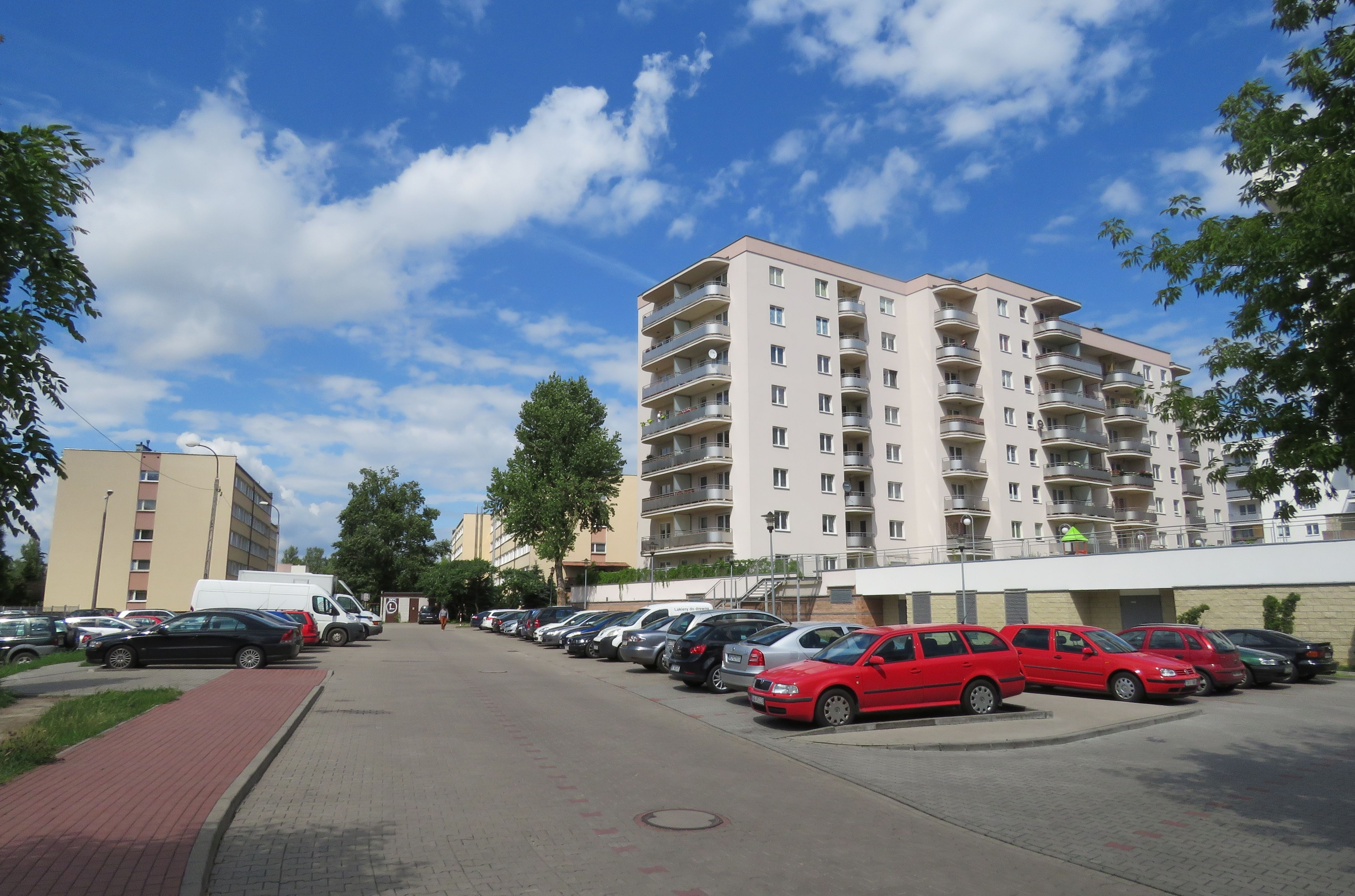

- Flag Coat of arms

- Location of Ursus within Warsaw
- Coordinates: 52°11′34″N 20°53′23″E
- Country: Poland
- Voivodeship: Masovian
- County/City: Warsaw

Government
  - Mayor: Bogdan Olesiński

Area
  - Total: 9.36 km^{2} (3.61 sq mi)

Population (2019)
  - Total: 60,112
  - Density: 6,420/km^{2} (16,600/sq mi)
- Time zone: UTC+1 (CET)
  - Summer (DST): UTC+2 (CEST)
- Area code: +48 22
- Website: ursus.um.warszawa.pl

Ursus is a district (dzielnica) of Warsaw, one of the 18 such units into which the city is divided. Between 1952 and 1977 it was a separate city. Until 1954 it was known as Czechowice.

== History ==
In the area that is today Ursus, there were three villages in the 14th century: Czechowice, Skorosze and Szamoty (later called Gołąbki).

Industrialisation in the 20th century contributed to developing these villages. Skorosze became the seat of the municipality, and in the early 1920s the Szamoty area's Zakłady Mechaniczne "Ursus" (English: Ursus Industrial Plants) (makers of agricultural machinery) were built. Czechowice became a housing estate due to it being in the vicinity of factories. In the 1939, before World War II, it had 7000 inhabitants. Skorosze had a school, police station and train station in its area.

In 1952 Czechowice, Skorosze and Szamoty were combined into one city, called Czechowice, which in 1954 changed its name to Ursus (there had been another Czechowice-Dziedzice city already, located in southern Poland).

From June 25 to June 30, 1976, the city of Ursus witnessed strikes after the communists raised food prices. Many people got injured and arrested. It was the signal that started Komitet Obrony Robotników (KOR), a movement which was successful in uniting the workers and intellectuals against the communist government, which eventually led to the birth of the Solidarity movement.

On August 1, 1977, Ursus became part of Warsaw within the Ochota district as punishment for the strikes in June 1976. Ursus lost its independence as a separate city.

Since January 1, 1993 Ursus has been a separate district.

== The present ==
Ursus is one of the smallest Warsaw districts. It also has the lowest crime rate.

== Neighbourhoods within the district ==
- Gołąbki
- Szamoty
- Niedźwiadek
- Czechowice
- Skorosze

== Twin towns ==
- Shevchenkivskyi District, Kyiv, Ukraine
