= Koluszki =

Town in Łódź Voivodeship, Poland

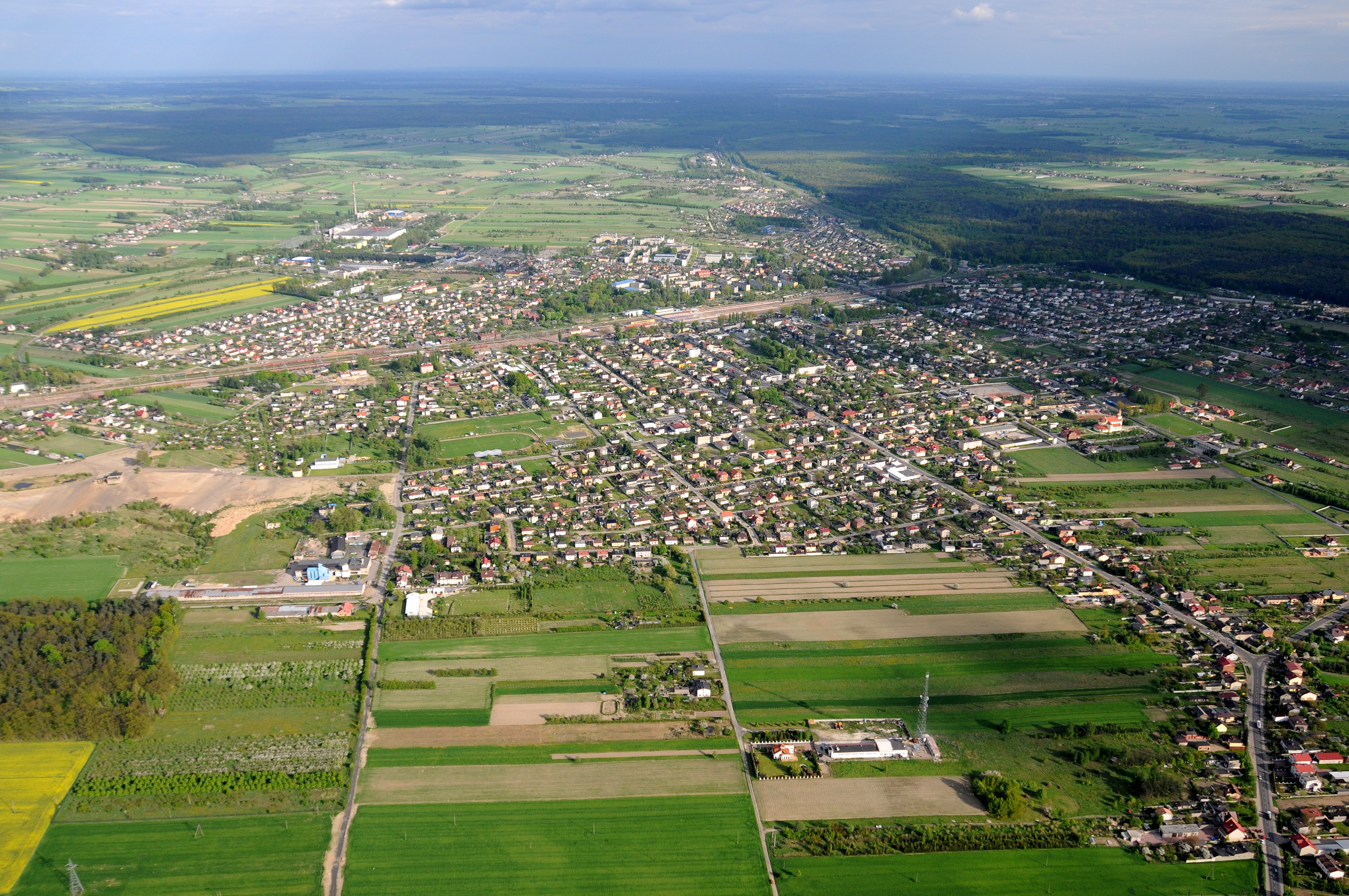
- Aerial view of Koluszki

- Flag Coat of arms

- Location within Poland
- Coordinates: 51°45′N 19°48′E
- Country: Poland
- Voivodeship: Łódź
- County: Łódź East
- Gmina: Koluszki
- First mentioned: 1399
- Town rights: 1949

Government
  - Burmistrz: Waldemar Chałat

Area
  - Total: 9.41 km^{2} (3.63 sq mi)
- Elevation: 211 m (692 ft)

Population (31 December 2020)
  - Total: 12,776 ▼
  - Density: 1,360/km^{2} (3,520/sq mi)
- Time zone: UTC+1 (CET)
  - Summer (DST): UTC+2 (CEST)
- Postal code: 95-040
- Car plates: ELW
- Website: www.koluszki.pl

Koluszki (Polish pronunciation: [kɔˈluʂkʲi]) is a town, and a major railway junction, in central Poland, in Łódź Voivodeship, about 20 km (12 mi) east of Łódź with a population of 12,776 (2020). The junction in Koluszki serves trains that go from Warsaw to Łódź, Wrocław, Częstochowa and Katowice. It is also connected to Radom and Lublin by an eastbound line.

== History ==
Koluszki was first mentioned in 1399, when it was part of the Jagiellonian-ruled Kingdom of Poland. In the 14th and 15th century, it prospered along the trade route between Gdańsk and Ruthenia. By 1790, there was a grist mill, sawmill, brewery, and inn. Under the Second Partition of Poland in 1793, the settlement was annexed by Prussia. It was regained by Poles and included in the short-lived Duchy of Warsaw in 1807, and afterwards it became part of Congress Poland following the Congress of Vienna in 1815, later forcibly integrated into Russia.

On September 2, 1846, the settlement was first connected to the emerging Polish railways as part of the mainline between Warsaw and Kraków. Following the development of Łódź as an industrial center, Koluszki served as the junction for its rail. By 1900, about half of the settlement worked for the railway in some capacity and the settlement developed around the railway and bus stations. After World War I Poland regained independence, and Koluszki was reintegrated with the reborn state. The town suffered during both world wars.

=== World War II ===
On 1–5 September 1939, in the first days of the German invasion of Poland, which started World War II, the German Luftwaffe raided Koluszki multiple times. On September 1–3, many inhabitants fled, and Polish anti-aircraft artillery shot down six German planes. On September 6, the Germans entered Koluszki and the occupation began, Koluszki was annexed directly to Germany and its population was subjected to various repressions, including mass arrests, deportations to Nazi concentration camps and murder. Mass arrests of Polish intelligentsia, including teachers, were carried out on November 9, 1939 as part of the Intelligenzaktion. Nevertheless, it was a local center of the Polish resistance movement, and Polish partisans were active in the area. At the railway station in Koluszki, Poles helped five Finns and a Norwegian – who were being transported by the Germans to a concentration camp – to escape, after which they joined the Polish resistance movement.

The occupiers operated a forced labour camp for Poles and Jews at a local sawmill. The Germans also established a Jewish ghetto in April 1941. Hundreds of Jews from around the area were sent to the Koluszki ghetto so that the pre-war Jewish population of about 500 swelled to over 3000. Living conditions were horrific with up to ten people living in each room and others living in the streets or in attics. Hunger and typhus epidemics killed many. In October 1942, the Gestapo and German and Polish police rounded up the ghetto population. A few dozen escaped, as many as 500 were murdered in Koluszki, and the rest were loaded on a train for Treblinka. There they were immediately gassed. There were a few survivors of unknown numbers among Koluszki's Jewish population. Several Christian Poles helped a few Jews hide, and three, the Krzyzanowski family, were recognized after the war as Righteous Among the Nations for hiding six Jews.

The town was restored to Poland by the Red Army on January 18, 1945.

Its town charter was established in 1949.

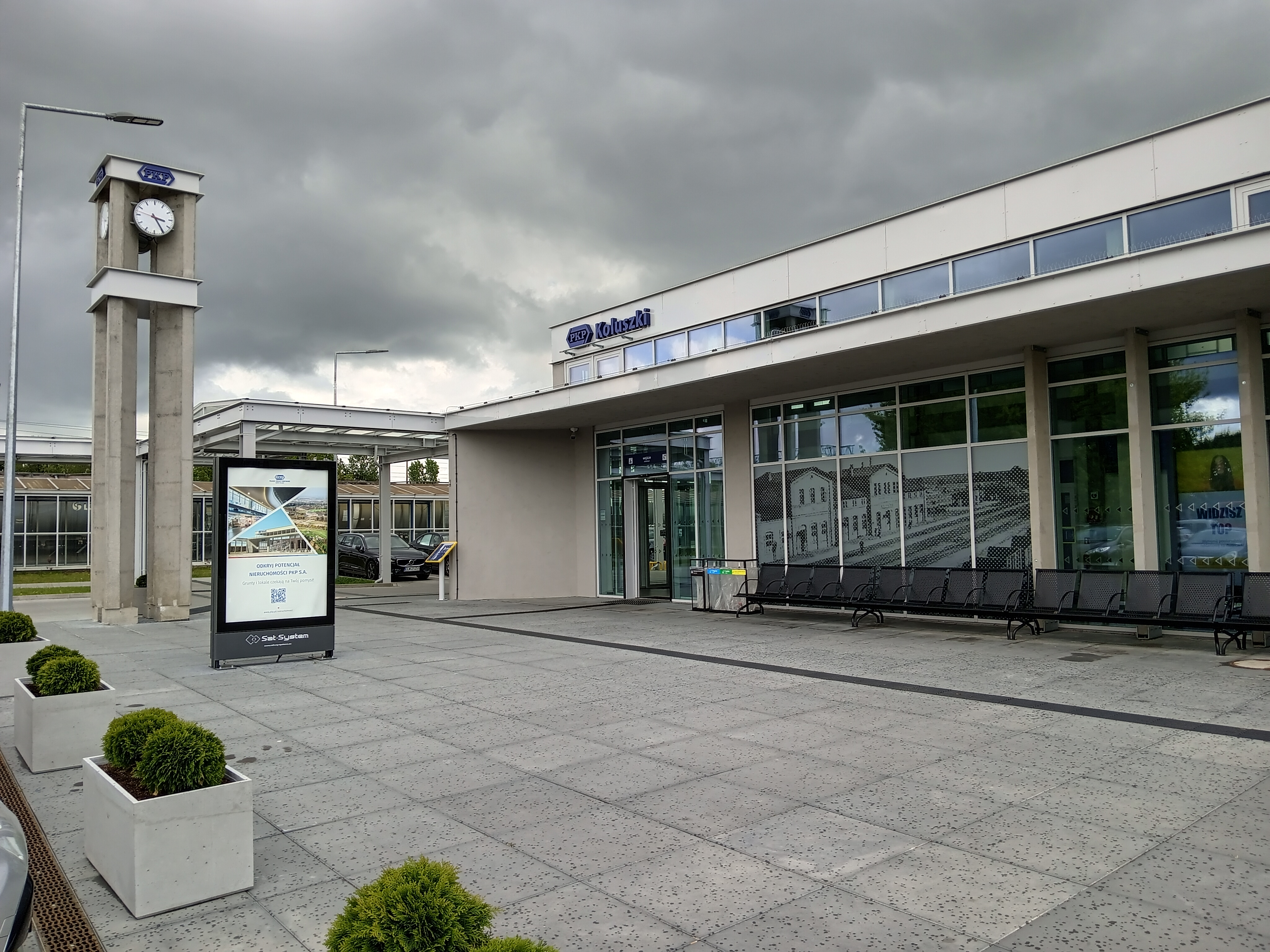
Koluszki railway station

== Post ==
Poczta Polska – the postal service of Poland maintains its Department of Undelivered Mail (Wydział Przesyłek Niedoręczalnych) in the Koluszki post office.

== Sports ==
The local football club is KKS Koluszki. It competes in the lower leagues.

== Notable people ==
- Władysław Strzemiński (1893–1952), avant-garde painter
- Katarzyna Kobro (1898–1951), avant-garde sculptor
- Lidia Kopania (1978–present), Polish singer and represented Poland in the Eurovision Song Contest 2009
