= Kraków Płaszów railway station =

Railway station in Kraków, Poland

Kraków Płaszów
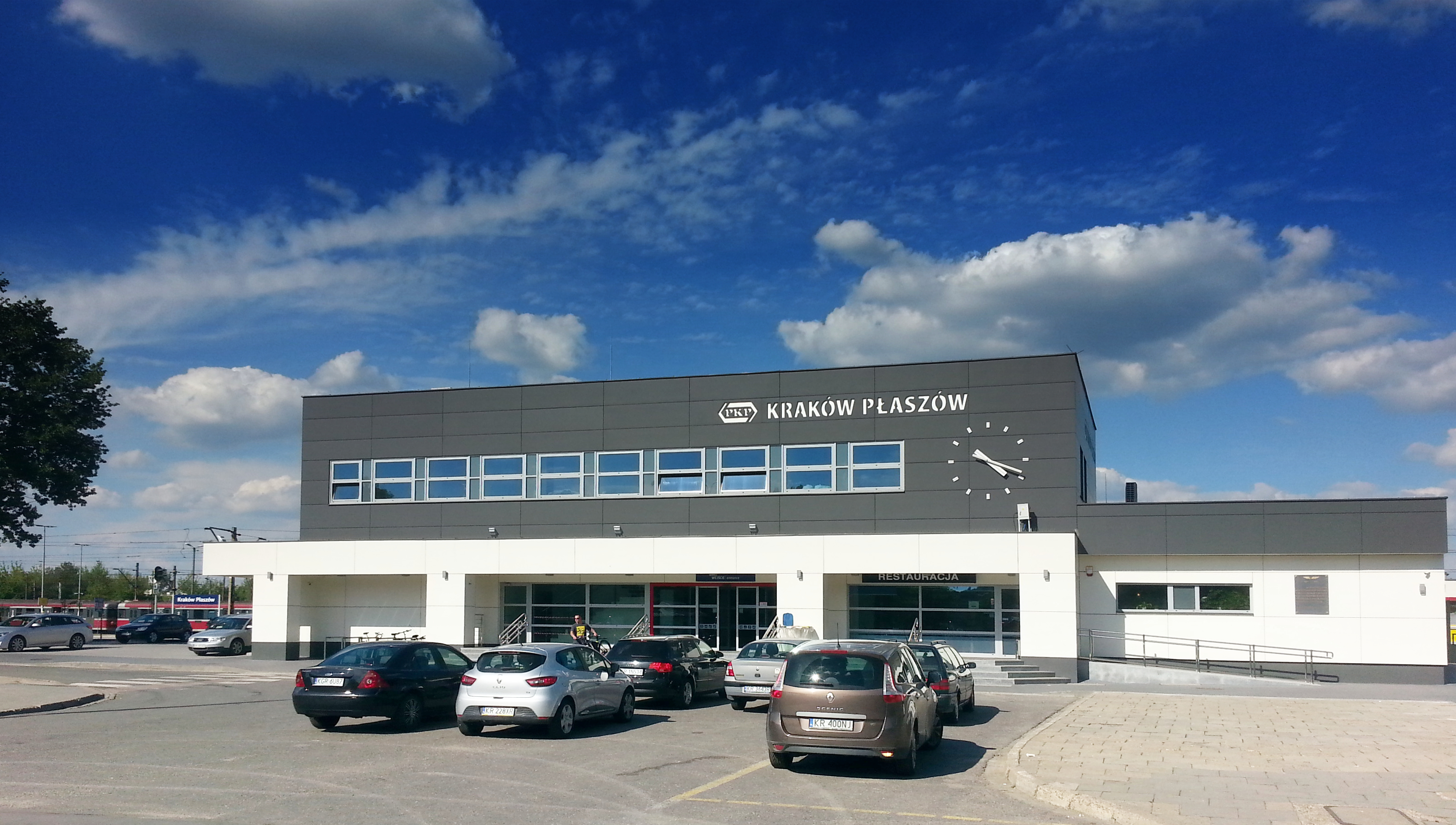
- Façade of Kraków Płaszów railway station (2016)

General information
- Location: Płaszów; Kraków, Lesser Poland; Poland
- Coordinates: 50.03473°N 19.9723325°E,
- Owner: Polskie Koleje Państwowe S.A.
- Lines: 91: Kraków Główny – Medyka; 94: Kraków Płaszów – Oświęcim; 100: Kraków Mydlniki – Kraków Bieżanów; 112: Kraków Płaszów – Kraków Wisła; 624: Kraków Zabłocie – Kraków Bonarka
- Platforms: 3
- Tracks: 5

Construction
- Structure type: Building: Yes

History
- Opened: 1884
- Rebuilt: 2015
- Former names: Podgórze (1884-1885); Podgórze Płaszów (1885-1924)
Location

Kraków Płaszów railway station is a railway station in Płaszów, a suburb of Kraków (Lesser Poland), Poland. As of 2022, it is served by Lesser Poland Railways (KMŁ),Polregio, and PKP Intercity (EIP, InterCity, and TLK services). The station is located near Kraków-Płaszów concentration camp. The station is about 4.5 km southeast of Kraków Główny (Main) station.

== Train services ==
The station is served by the following services:

- EuroCity services (EC) (EC 95 by DB) (IC by PKP) Berlin - Frankfurt (Oder) - Rzepin - Wrocław – Katowice – Kraków – Rzeszów – Przemyśl
- Express Intercity Premium services (EIP) Gdynia - Warsaw - Kraków - Rzeszów
- Intercity services (IC) Zielona Góra - Wrocław - Opele - Częstochowa - Kraków - Rzeszów - Przemyśl
- Intercity services (IC) Ustka - Koszalin - Poznań - Wrocław - Katowice - Kraków - Rzeszów - Przemyśl
- Regional services (PR) Katowice — Kraków — Dębica
- Regional services (PR) Zakopane - Nowy Targ - Chabówka - Skawina - Kraków Płaszów
- Regional services (PR) Kraków - Bochnia - Tarnów - Dębica - Rzeszów
- Regional services (PR) Kraków - Bochnia - Tarnów - Nowy Sącz - Piwniczna
- Regional services (PR) Kraków - Bochnia - Tarnów - Nowy Sącz - Piwniczna - Krynica-Zdrój
- Regional Service (KMŁ) SKA1 Kraków Lotnisko (Airport) - Kraków Gł. - Kopalnia - Wieliczka Rynek-Kopalnia
- Regional Service (KMŁ) SKA3 Oświęcim (Auschwitz) - Trzebinia - Kraków Gł. - Tarnów

| Preceding station | PKP Intercity | Following station |
|---|---|---|
| Kraków Główny towards Berlin Hbf | EuroCity EC 95; IC | Bochnia towards Przemyśl Główny |
| Kraków Główny towards Gdynia Główna | EIP | Bochnia towards Rzeszów Główny |
| Kraków Główny towards Zielona Góra Główna | IC | Bochnia towards Przemyśl Główny |
| Kraków Główny towards Ustka | IC | Bochnia towards Przemyśl Główny |
| Preceding station | Polregio | Following station |
| Kraków Zabłocie towards Katowice | PR | Kraków Prokocim towards Dębica |
| Kraków Zabłocie towards Kraków Główny | PR | Kraków Prokocim towards Rzeszów Główny, Piwniczna or Krynica-Zdrój |
| Terminus | PR | Kraków Podgórze towards Zakopane |
| Preceding station | KMŁ | Following station |
| Kraków Zabłocie towards Kraków Lotnisko (Airport) | SKA1 | Kraków Prokocim towards Wieliczka Rynek |
| Kraków Zabłocie towards Oświęcim (Auschwitz) | SKA3 | Kraków Bieżanów towards Tarnów |
