= Bochnia railway station =

Railway station in Lesser Poland, Poland

Bochnia
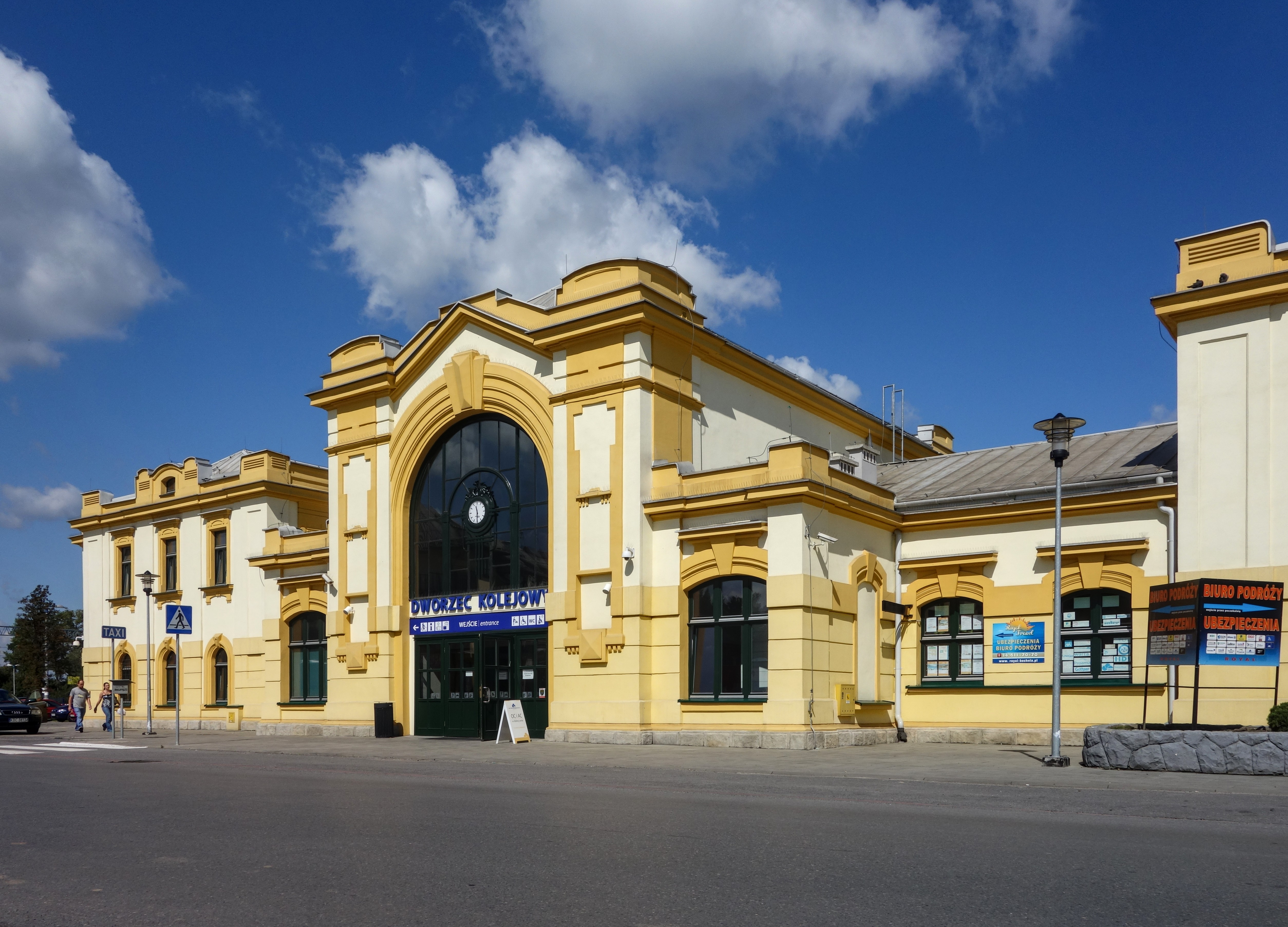
- Façade of Bochnia railway station

General information
- Location: Bochnia; Lesser Poland; Poland
- Coordinates: 49.9771124°N 20.4291446°E
- Owner: Polskie Koleje Państwowe S.A.
- Line: 91: Kraków Główny – Medyka
- Platforms: 3
- Tracks: 4

Construction
- Structure type: Building

History
- Opened: 1856
Location

Bochnia railway station is a railway station in Bochnia,Lesser Poland, Poland. As of 2022, it is served by Lesser Poland Railways (KMŁ), Polregio, and PKP Intercity (EIP, InterCity, and TLK services).

== Train services ==
The following services serve the station:

- EuroCity services (EC) (EC 95 by DB) (IC by PKP) Berlin - Frankfurt (Oder) - Rzepin - Wrocław – Katowice – Kraków – Rzeszów – Przemyśl
- Express Intercity Premium services (EIP) Gdynia - Warsaw - Kraków - Rzeszów
- Intercity services (IC) Zielona Góra - Wrocław - Opole - Częstochowa - Kraków - Rzeszów - Przemyśl
- Intercity services (IC) Ustka - Koszalin - Poznań - Wrocław - Katowice - Kraków - Rzeszów - Przemyśl
- Regional services (PR) Katowice — Kraków — Dębica
- Regional services (PR) Kraków - Bochnia - Tarnów - Dębica - Rzeszów
- Regional services (PR) Kraków - Bochnia - Tarnów - Nowy Sącz - Piwniczna
- Regional services (PR) Kraków - Bochnia - Tarnów - Nowy Sącz - Piwniczna - Krynica-Zdrój
- Regional Service (KMŁ) SKA3 Oświęcim (Auschwitz) - Trzebinia - Kraków Gł. - Tarnów

Preceding station	PKP Intercity	Following station
Kraków Płaszów towards Berlin Hbf	EuroCity EC 95; IC	Tarnów towards Przemyśl Główny
Kraków Płaszów towards Gdynia Główna	EIP	Tarnów towards Rzeszów Główny
Kraków Płaszów towards Zielona Góra Główna	IC	Brzesko Okocim towards Przemyśl Główny
Kraków Płaszów towards Ustka	IC	Brzesko Okocim towards Przemyśl Główny
Preceding station	Polregio	Following station
Cikowice towards Katowice	PR	Rzezawa towards Dębica
Cikowice towards Kraków Główny	PR	Rzezawa towards Rzeszów Główny, Piwniczna or Krynica-Zdrój
Preceding station	KMŁ	Following station
Cikowice towards Oświęcim (Auschwitz)	SKA3	Rzezawa towards Tarnów
