= Dębica railway station =

Railway station in Subcarpathia, Poland

Dębica
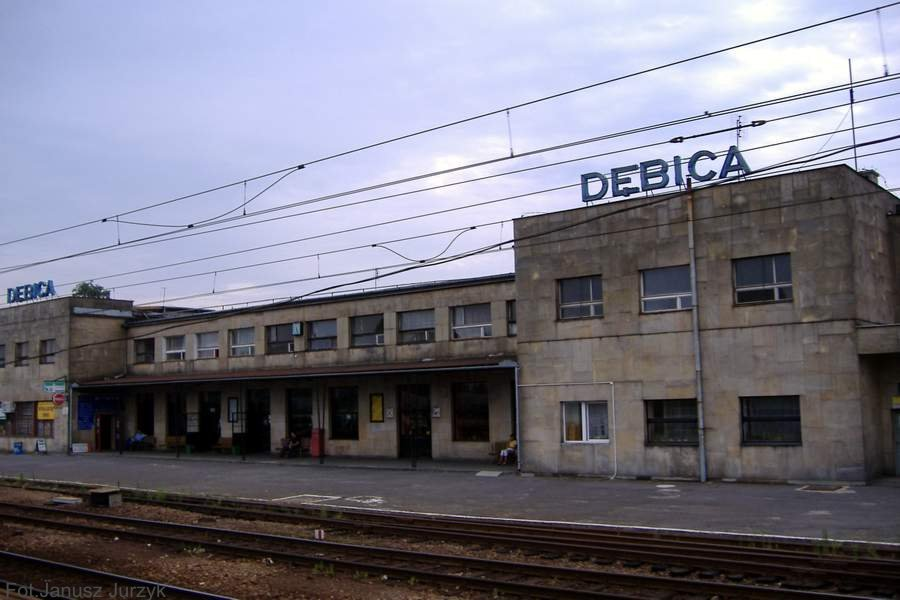

General information
- Location: Dębica; Subcarpathia; Poland
- Coordinates: 50.0546°N 21.4033113°E
- Owner: Polskie Koleje Państwowe S.A.
- Line: 25: Łódź Kaliska – Dębica; 91: Kraków Główny – Medyka
- Platforms: 2
- Tracks: 4

Construction
- Structure type: Building: Yes

History
- Opened: 1856
Location

Dębica railway station is a railway station in Dębica (Subcarpathia), Poland. As of 2022, it is served by Polregio and PKP Intercity (EIP, InterCity, and TLK services).

== Train services ==
The following services serve the station:

- EuroCity services (EC) (EC 95 by DB) (IC by PKP) Berlin - Frankfurt (Oder) - Rzepin - Wrocław – Katowice – Kraków – Rzeszów – Przemyśl
- Express Intercity Premium services (EIP) Gdynia - Warsaw - Kraków - Rzeszów
- Intercity services (IC) Zielona Góra - Wrocław - Opele - Częstochowa - Kraków - Rzeszów - Przemyśl
- Intercity services (IC) Ustka - Koszalin - Poznań - Wrocław - Katowice - Kraków - Rzeszów - Przemyśl
- Regional services (PR) Katowice — Kraków — Dębica
- Regional services (PR) Tarnów - Dębica - Rzeszów
- Regional services (PR) Kraków - Bochnia - Tarnów - Dębica - Rzeszów
- Regional services (PR) Tarnów - Dębica - Rzeszów - Jarosław - Przemyśl
- Regional services (PR) Dębica - Mielec
- Regional services (PR) Dębica - Mielec - Padew
- Regional services (PKA) Dębica - Rzeszów

Preceding station	PKP Intercity	Following station
Tarnów towards Berlin Hbf	EuroCity EC 95; IC	Rzeszów Główny towards Przemyśl Główny
Tarnów towards Gdynia Główna	EIP	Rzeszów Główny Terminus
Tarnów towards Zielona Góra Główna	IC	Ropczyce towards Przemyśl Główny
Tarnów towards Ustka	IC	Rzeszów Główny towards Przemyśl Główny
Preceding station	Polregio	Following station
Grabiny towards Katowice	PR	Terminus
Grabinye towards Kraków Główny	PR	Dębica Wschodnia towards Rzeszów Główny
Grabiny towards Tarnów	PR	Dębica Wschodnia towards Rzeszów Główny or Przemyśl Główny
Terminus	PR	Pustynia towards Mielec or Padew
Preceding station	PKA	Following station
Terminus	Rzeszów - Dębica	Dębica Wschodnia towards Rzeszów Główny
