= Tarnów railway station =

Railway station in Lesser Poland, Poland

Tarnów
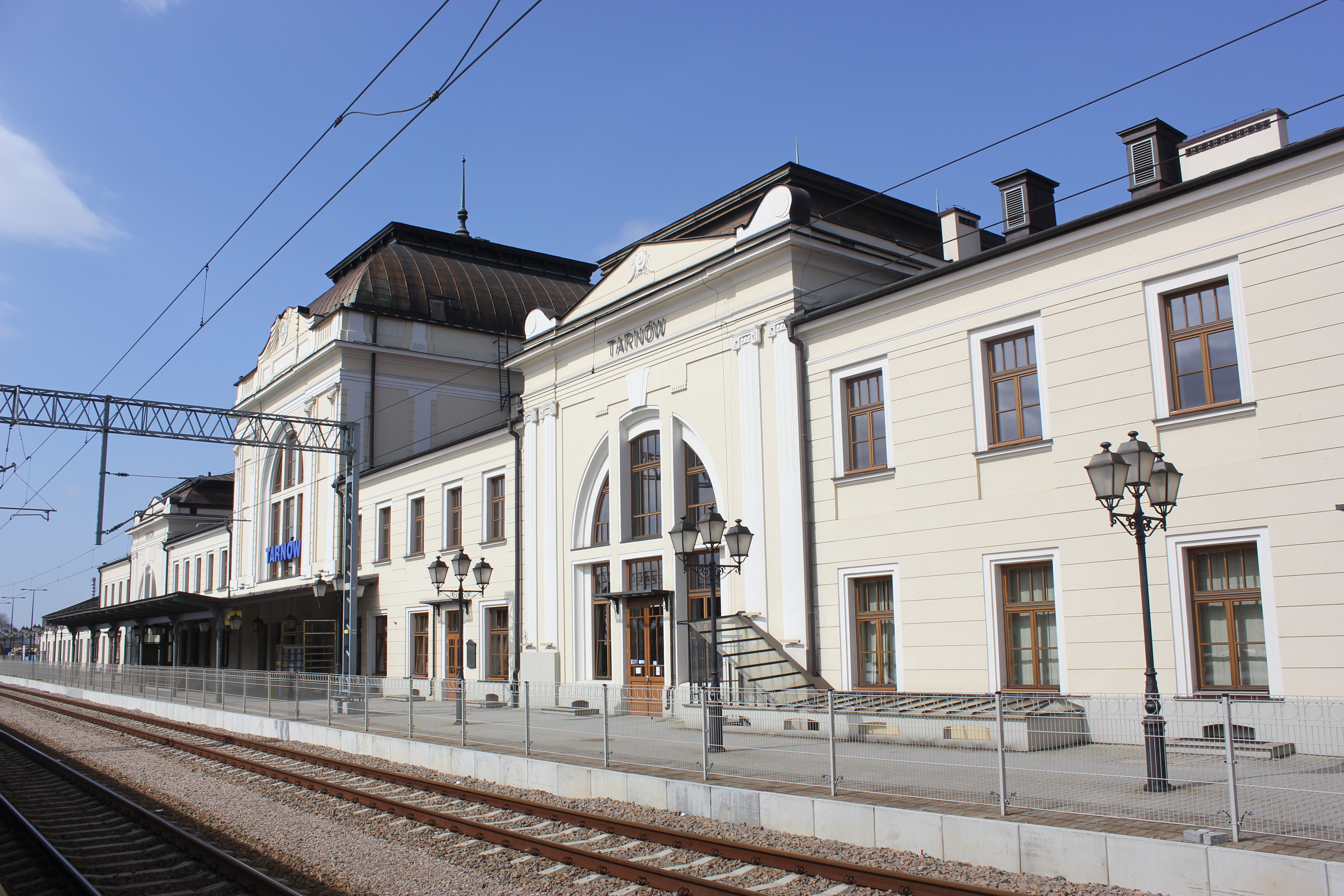
- Façade of Tarnów railway station

General information
- Location: Tarnów; Lesser Poland; Poland
- Coordinates: 50.0057298°N 20.972428°E
- Owner: Polskie Koleje Państwowe S.A.
- Lines: 91: Kraków Główny – Medyka; 96: Tarnów – Leluchów; 115: Tarnów – Szczucin koło Tarnowa
- Platforms: 3
- Tracks: 6

Construction
- Structure type: Building: Yes

History
- Opened: 20 February 1856
Location

Tarnów railway station is a railway station in Tarnów (Lesser Poland), Poland. As of 2022, it is served by Lesser Poland Railways (KMŁ), Polregio, and PKP Intercity (EIP, InterCity, and TLK services).

== History ==
The station opened on 20 February 1856. During the Nazi occupation of Poland, the station was called Tarnow. The station was renamed back to Tarnów in 1945.

=== 1939 bombing ===
On 28 August 1939, just two days before the outbreak of World War II, two time bombs were detonated, killing around 20 and injuring 35 people. About one-third of the station building was destroyed. No motive was ever concluded, however, it is believed that the bombing was intended to incite anger against Germans in Poland, therefore providing justification for the invasion of Poland.

== Train services ==
The following services serve the station:

- EuroCity services (EC) (EC 95 by DB) (IC by PKP) Berlin - Frankfurt (Oder) - Rzepin - Wrocław – Katowice – Kraków – Rzeszów – Przemyśl
- Express Intercity Premium services (EIP) Gdynia - Warsaw - Kraków - Rzeszów
- Intercity services (IC) Zielona Góra - Wrocław - Opele - Częstochowa - Kraków - Rzeszów - Przemyśl
- Intercity services (IC) Ustka - Koszalin - Poznań - Wrocław - Katowice - Kraków - Rzeszów - Przemyśl
- Regional services (PR) Katowice — Kraków — Dębica
- Regional services (PR) Tarnów - Dębica - Rzeszów
- Regional services (PR) Kraków - Bochnia - Tarnów - Dębica - Rzeszów
- Regional services (PR) Kraków - Bochnia - Tarnów - Nowy Sącz - Piwniczna
- Regional services (PR) Kraków - Bochnia - Tarnów - Nowy Sącz - Piwniczna - Krynica-Zdrój
- Regional services (PR) Tarnów - Dębica - Rzeszów - Jarosław - Przemyśl
- Regional Service (PR) Tarnów - Nowy Sącz - Muszyna
- Regional Service (KMŁ) SKA3 Oświęcim (Auschwitz) - Trzebinia - Kraków Gł. - Tarnów

Preceding station	PKP Intercity	Following station
Bochnia towards Berlin Hbf	EuroCity EC 95; IC	Dębica towards Przemyśl Główny
Bochnia towards Gdynia Główna	EIP	Dębica towards Rzeszów Główny
Brzesko Okocim towards Zielona Góra Główna	IC	Dębica towards Przemyśl Główny
Brzesko Okocim towards Ustka	IC	Dębica towards Przemyśl Główny
Preceding station	Polregio	Following station
Tarnów Mościce towards Katowice	PR	Wola Rzędzińska towards Dębica
Tarnów Mościce towards Kraków Główny	PR	Wola Rzędzińska towards Rzeszów Główny
Terminus	PR	Wola Rzędzińska towards Rzeszów Główny or Przemyśl Główny
Terminus	PR	Kłokowa towards Muszyna
Tarnów Mościce towards Kraków Główny	PR	Kłokowa towards Piwniczna
Tarnów Mościce towards Kraków Główny	PR	Łowczówek Pleśna towards Krynica-Zdrój
Preceding station	KMŁ	Following station
Tarnów Mościce towards Oświęcim (Auschwitz)	SKA3	Terminus

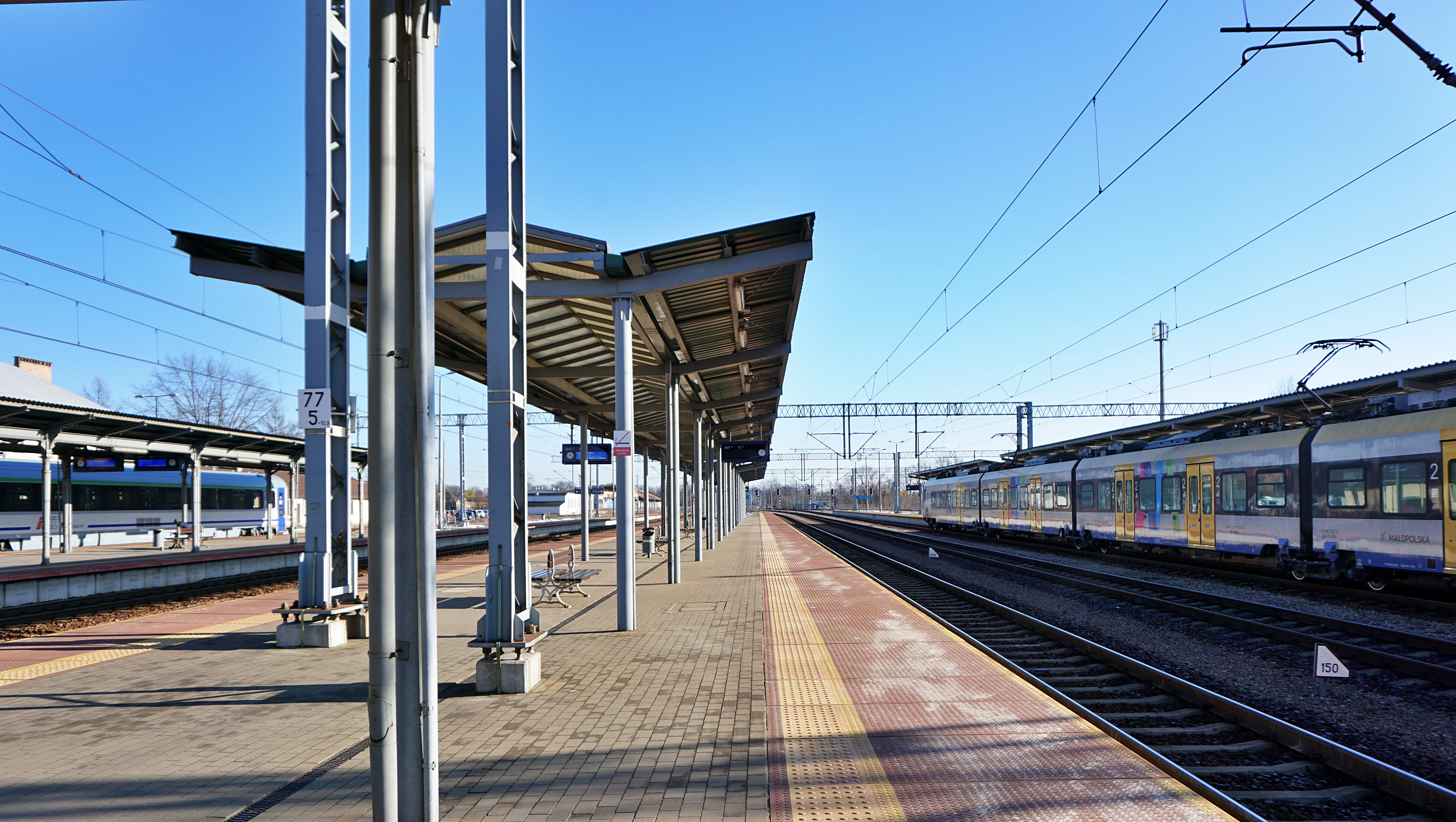
Platform 2, direction Rzeszów

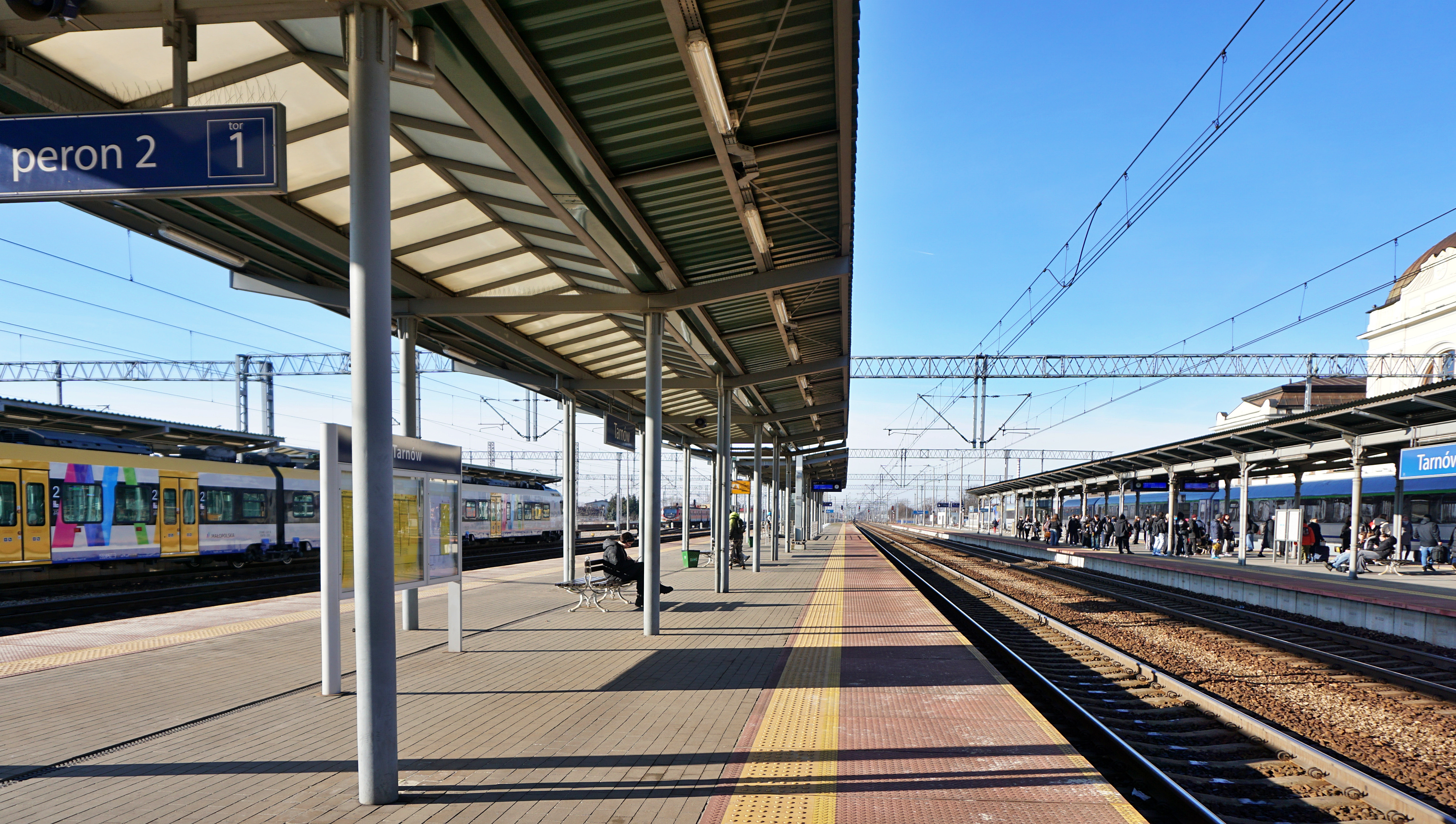
Platform 2, direction Kraków
