= Rzeszów–Jasionka Airport =

Airport in Poland

Rzeszów Jasionka Airport Port Lotniczy Rzeszów-Jasionka im. Rodziny Ulmów

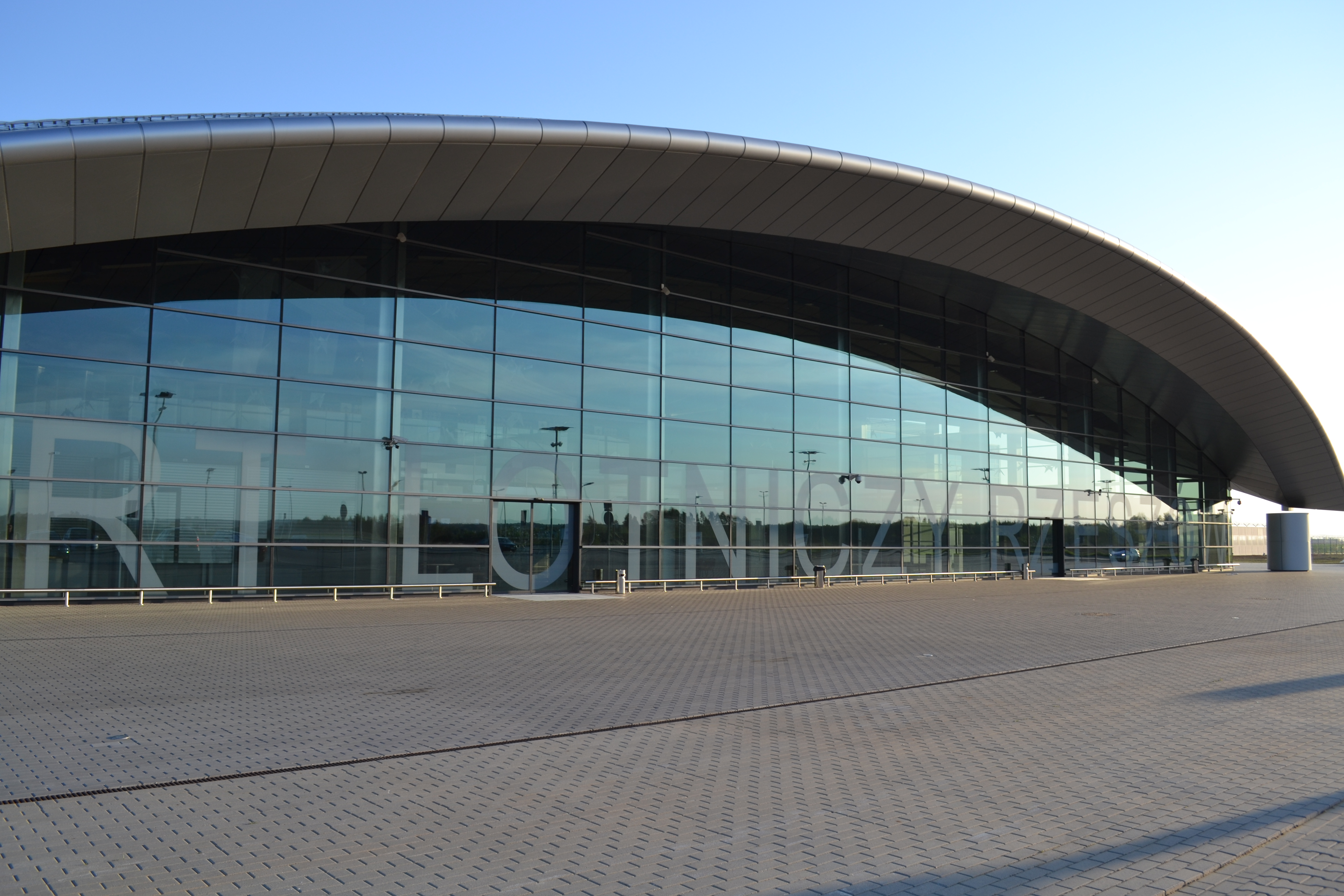
- IATA: RZE; ICAO: EPRZ

Summary
- Airport type: Public/Military
- Operator: Spółka Port Lotniczy "Rzeszów-Jasionka im. Rodziny Ulmów" sp. z o. o.
- Serves: Rzeszów
- Location: Jasionka, Poland
- Elevation AMSL: 211 m (692 ft)
- Coordinates: 50°06′36″N 022°01′08″E
- Website: rzeszowairport.pl

Map
- Location of airport in Podkarpackie Voivodeship Location of airport in Poland Location of airport in Europe

Runways
Direction	Length		Surface
Direction	m	ft	Surface
09/27	3,200	10,499	Asphalt/Concrete

Statistics (2024)
- Passengers: 1,145,257 ▲
- Aircraft movements: 20 947 (2023)▲
- Sources: Rzeszów Ulma Airport; Polish AIP at EUROCONTROL

Rzeszów Jasionka Airport (Polish: Port lotniczy Rzeszów-Jasionka) (IATA: RZE, ICAO: EPRZ), officially Rzeszów Ulma Family Airport, is an international airport serving Rzeszów, a city in southeastern Poland. It is located in the village of Jasionka, approximately 8 kilometres (5.0 mi) north of Rzeszów city center.

On 24 March 2024, Polish President Andrzej Duda renamed the airport after the Ulma Family, who were Polish citizens executed by the Nazi Army during World War II after they were discovered hiding Jews.

== History ==
=== Foundation and early years ===
Passenger domestic services to Rzeszów–Jasionka Airport began on 30 November 1945 with the opening of the circular domestic airline route Warsaw – Łódź –Kraków – Rzeszów – Lublin – Warsaw. The airport was rebuilt and opened for commercial traffic in 1949 after the first facilities built in 1940 were destroyed in 1944.

In 1999, the Polish Air Force, which had a presence at Rzeszów–Jasionka Airport since its opening, permanently closed its Rzeszów–Jasionka air base as part of an agreement by the Polish Ministry of Defence.

On 2 June 2007, LOT Polish Airlines commenced seasonal services to New York City's John F. Kennedy International Airport and Newark's Newark Liberty International Airport. Service to JFK has since ceased operations. As of January 2008, the airport has had scheduled international flights to Dublin and London–Stansted, in addition to its domestic connection with Warsaw.

=== Development since 2010 ===
In 2009–10, it registered an 18.66% increase in passenger traffic serving 451,720 passengers in 2010. Coupled with the September 2006 start of construction on a new passenger terminal, this means that the airport is undergoing a rapid expansion, albeit in fits and starts, owing to delays in setting up the management company and obtaining financing and routes. The new passenger terminal opened in May 2012. As of 2014, Rzeszów Airport had been cited as an airport with below-forecast passenger numbers and an inefficient usage of EU subsidies. The airport, however, underwent a European Court of Auditors audit in 2014 and among 20 other European airports – its marks were positive in terms of efficiency and legitimacy using EU funds on airports' modernisation.

During the Russo-Ukrainian war, the airport has been used as a trans-shipment hub for Ukraine's supporters to with medical aid, weapons and supplies. It is also widely used for air travel to Ukraine, due to its proximity to the Ukrainian border during the closure of Ukrainian Air Space. Supplies are flown to the airport and then driven along the A4 autostrada to the Polish-Ukrainian border. On 9 March 2022, the United States deployed two MIM-104 Patriot surface-to-air missile systems to the airport in what it called a "precautionary defensive move." On 5 March 2022, US Secretary of State Antony Blinken landed in Rzeszów to meet with Ukrainian Minister of Foreign Affairs Dmytro Kuleba in Ukraine. The President of the United States Joe Biden landed on Air Force One in Rzeszów twice, on 25 March 2022 to meet American troops, and on 19 February 2023, on the way to Kyiv. On 22 March 2023, William, Prince of Wales, landed in Rzeszów to meet British and Polish troops.

== Facilities ==
Rzeszów–Jasionka Airport features the third-longest runway in Poland, measuring 3,200 m × 45 m (10,500 ft × 150 ft). The airport is therefore capable of handling some of the world's largest aircraft, such as the Antonov An-124 and An-225, Boeing C-17 Globemaster III, Lockheed C-130 Hercules and the Boeing 747.

== Airlines and destinations ==
The following airlines operate regular scheduled flights to and from Rzeszów:

Airlines	Destinations
LOT Polish Airlines	Warsaw–Chopin; Seasonal: Gdańsk, Newark
Ryanair	Alicante, Bristol, Dublin, Edinburgh, London–Luton, London–Stansted, Malta, Manchester, Seasonal: Milan–Malpensa, Zadar
Smartwings Poland	Seasonal charter: Bodrum
Wizz Air	Podgorica, Rome–Fiumicino

== Statistics ==
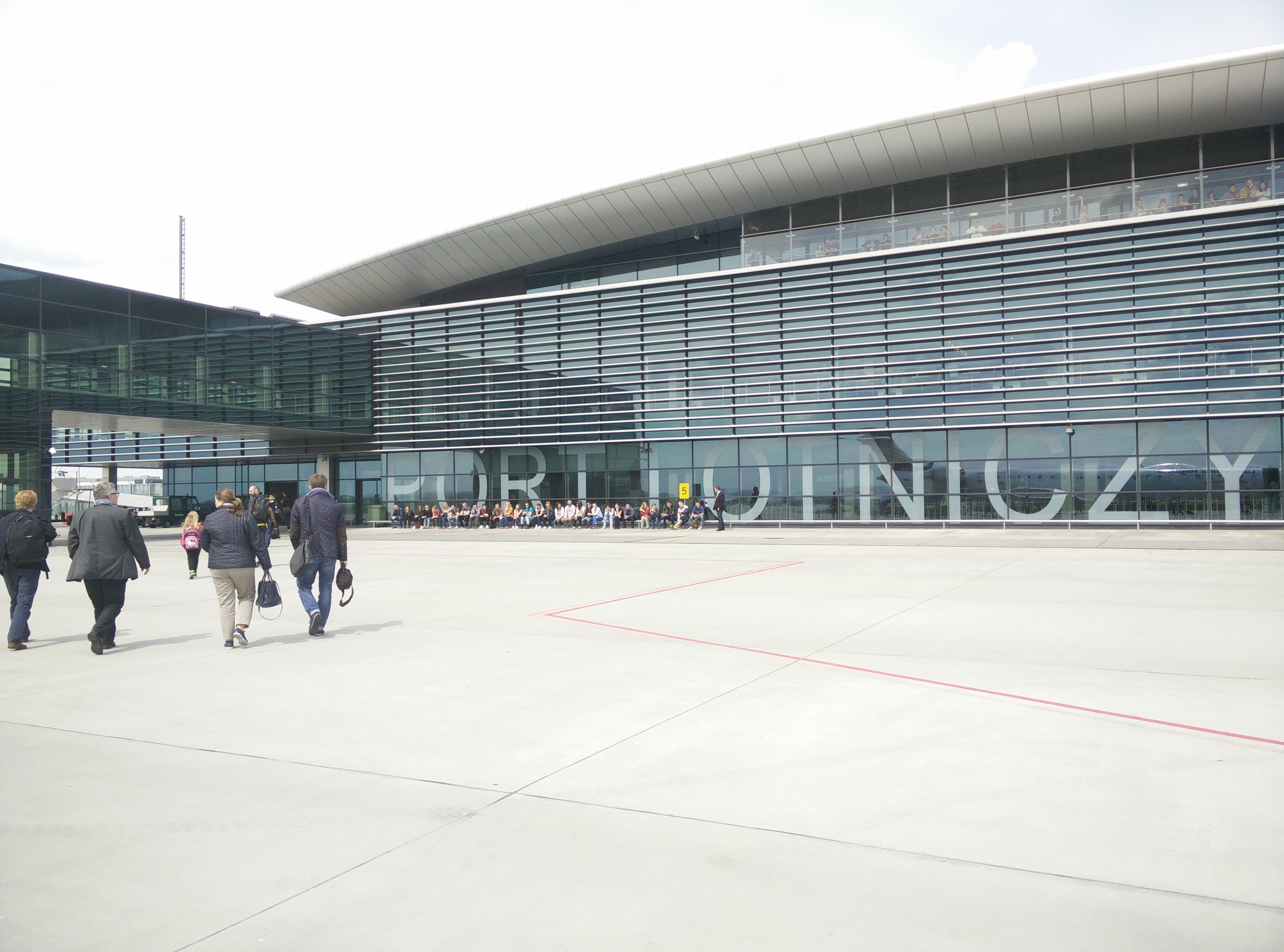
Apron view

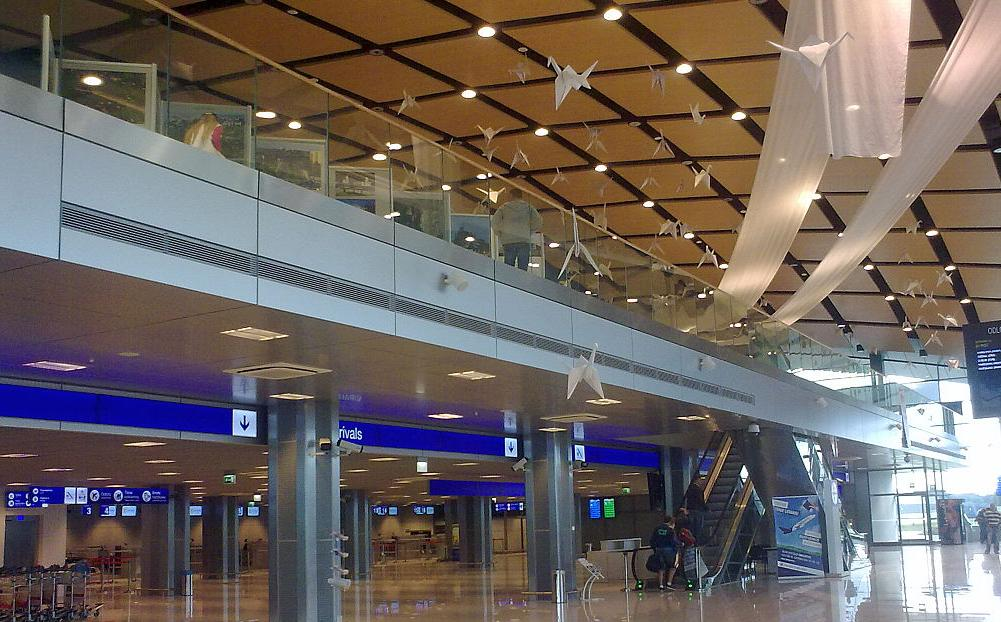
Terminal interior

Traffic by calendar year
	Passengers	Movements
2007	279,996	6,112
2008	323,838	9,662
2009	383,184	8,806
2010	454,203	10,919
2011	491,325	12,357
2012	564,992	12,355
2013	589,920	13,508
2014	601,070	10,656
2015	645,214	13,723
2016	664,068	12,629
2017	693,564	14,274
2018	771,287	18,164
2019	772,238	18,806
2020	235,190	12,918
2021	255,795	13,470
2022	731,141	14,876
2023	1,020,189	20,947
2024	1,145,257	21,408
2025	1,282,628	19,917

== Ground transportation ==
=== Rail ===
On 3 October 2023 a new rail link between the airport and Rzeszów Główny railway station opened, operated by Subcarpathian Agglomeration Railway. The journey takes 18 minutes and a single ticket costs 4 PLN.

=== Bus ===
The airport also features scheduled bus services from MPK and MKS to Rzeszów city centre.

== See also ==
- List of airports in Poland
