= Tarnów–Szczucin railway =

Railway line in Poland

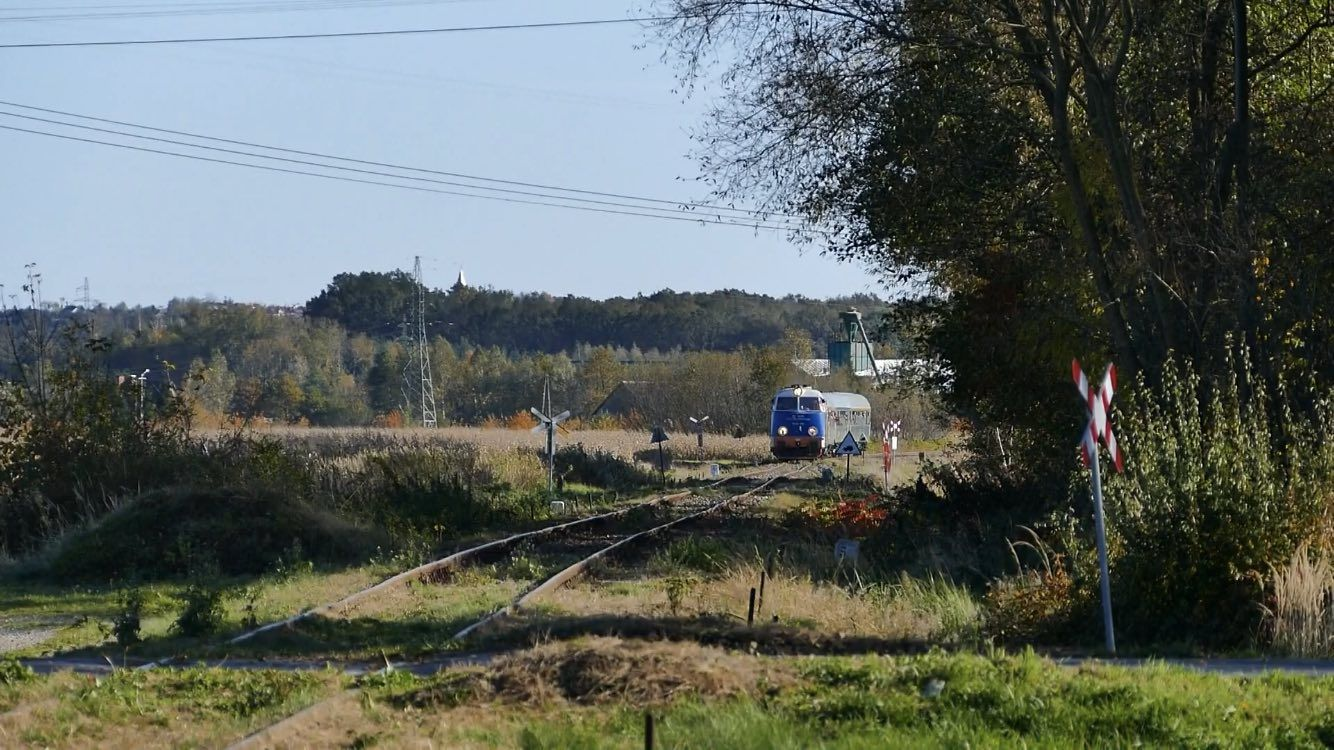
- Special train "Żaba" on the railway line

Overview
- Owner: PKP Polskie Linie Kolejowe
- Line number: 115
- Termini: Tarnów; Szczucin

History
- Opened: 1906
- Closed: 2000 (passenger); 2006 (freight, on the Żabno–Szczucin section)

Technical
- Line length: 48.356 km (30.047 mi)
- Track gauge: 1,435 mm (4 ft 8 1/2 in)
- Operating speed: 40 km/h (25 mph)
Route map
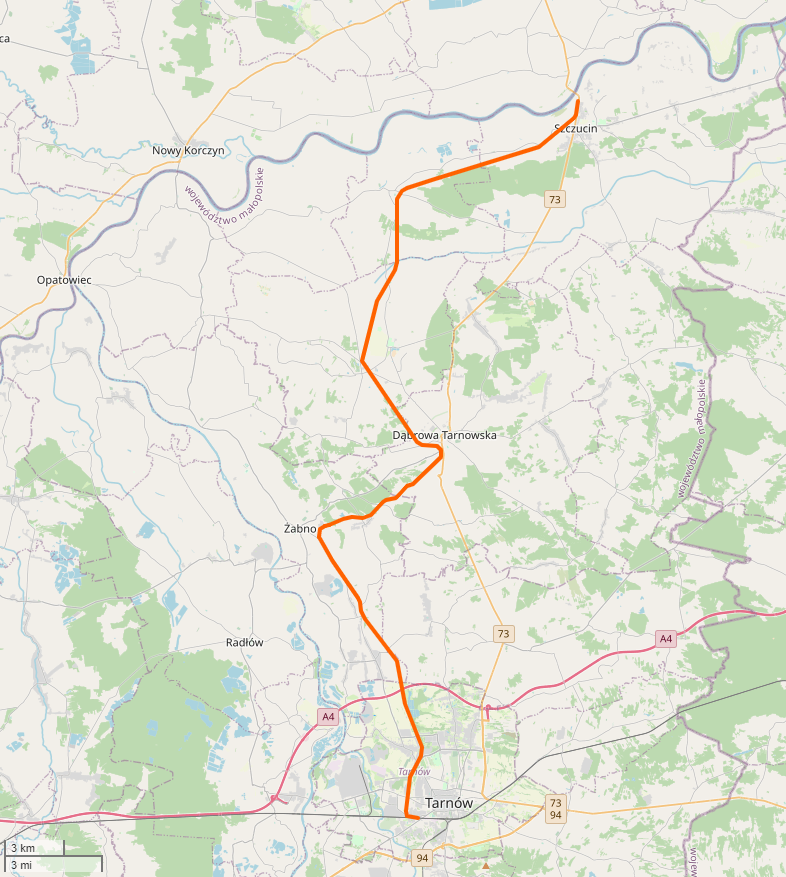

The Tarnów–Szczucin railway (commonly known as Szczucinka) is a single-track, non-electrified local railway in the Lesser Poland Voivodeship, connecting Tarnów with Szczucin. The railway route, whose infrastructure is utilized by railway line no. 115, was opened in 1906, with the first passenger train running that year. Passenger service was suspended on 3 April 2000, and since then, there has been sporadic freight traffic on the passable section.

As of 2026, the railway is closed but will be operational early September 2026 on the 16-kilometer stretch from Tarnów to Żabno.

== Route of the line ==
The line begins near the Tarnów railway station, branching off to the right from the Kraków Główny–Medyka railway at its 76th kilometer. The route then heads north, passing through the areas of Tarnów and the Tarnów County. In Żabno, the line turns to the northeast, heading toward Dąbrowa Tarnowska. In Dąbrowa, the track turns again, this time towards Olesno, from where the line proceeds north and then east toward Szczucin.

The line passes through the city of Tarnów and the Tarnów and Dąbrowa counties.

== Technical characteristics ==
The trackbed of the line is constructed with S-49 type rails and concrete and wooden ties from the years between 1981 and 1983. The route is of a flat terrain type.

In 2021, a significant portion of the line was impassable due to overgrown and stolen track infrastructure. Movement was only possible on a 16-kilometer stretch from Tarnów to Żabno (0.765–16.044 km). The passable sections of the line were classified as C3.

As of 29 November 2016, the following maximum speeds for trains were in effect:

Kilometer range		Speed		
Kilometer range		Track 1		
from	to	Railbuses and EMUs	Wagon trains	Freight trains
0.765	16.400	40		
16.400	49.121	0		

== Infrastructure ==
=== Operating points ===
There are 17 operating points on the line:

Kilometer	Name	Platforms	Platform Edges	Infrastructure	Photo	Source
0.000	Tarnów railway station	3	6	Station building, ticket offices, signal boxes (Tr, Tr1), underground passage, shelters, water tower, motive power depot		
1.259	Tarnów Północny railway station	1	1	Station building (demolished), ticket office (closed)		
3.810	Tarnów Klikowa railway station	1	1	Station building (devastated), ticket office		
4.200	Tarnów Klikowa (industrial spur)	0	0			
9.869	Łukowa Tarnowska railway station	1 (formerly 2)	1 (formerly 2)	Station building (demolished), ticket office (closed), signal boxes (Łk, Łk1)		
12.034	Łęg Tarnowski railway station	1	1	Station building (demolished), ticket office (closed)		
14.233	Niedomice railway station	1	1	Station building repurposed, ticket office (closed)		
14.380	Niedomice Zuch (industrial spur)	0	0			
16.044	Żabno railway station	1 (formerly 3)	1 (formerly 3)	Station building (closed, in good condition), ticket office (closed), signal boxes (Żb, Żb1)		
20.013	Fiuk railway station	1	1	Station building (demolished), ticket office (closed), industrial spur		
24.767	Dąbrowa Tarnowska railway station	2	4	Station building repurposed, ticket office (closed), signal box, water tower (demolished)		
29.935	Olesno Tarnowskie railway station	1	1	Station building (closed, in good condition), ticket office (closed)		
34.382	Dąbrówki Breńskie railway station	1	1	Station building (demolished), ticket office (closed)		
37.903	Mędrzechów railway station	1	1	Station building repurposed, ticket office (closed)		
40.800	Kupienin railway station	1	1	Station building (demolished), ticket office (closed)		
43.265	Delastowice railway station	1	1	Station building (demolished), ticket office (closed)		
48.800	Szczucin koło Tarnowa railway station	2	0	Station building repurposed, ticket office (closed), signal boxes (Sn, Sn1), roofed area (demolished), water tower (demolished), motive power depot (demolished)		

== History ==
=== Background of creation ===
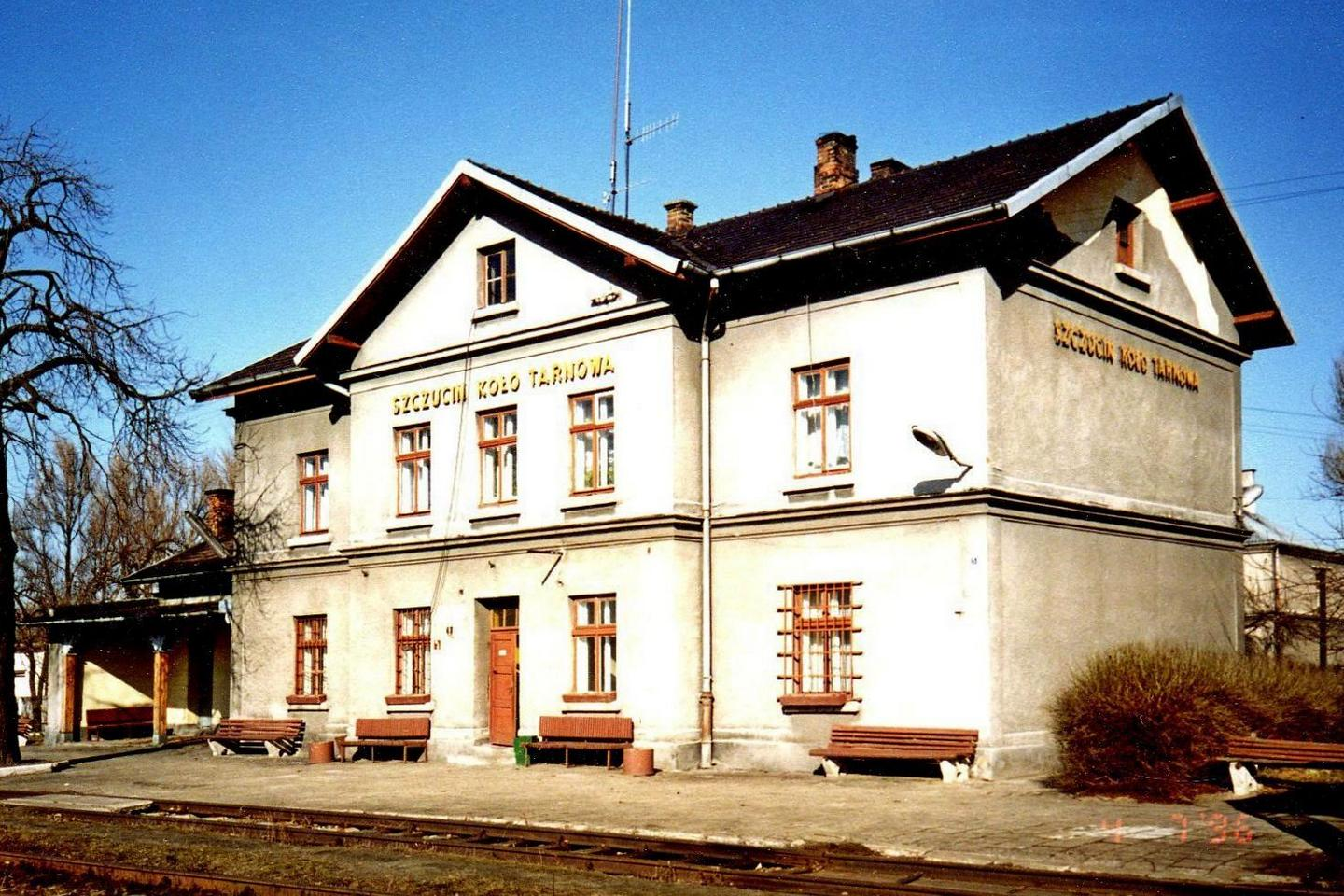
Station building at Szczucin koło Tarnowa railway station

The history of the Szczucinka line begins in the 1870s when landowners from the Dąbrowa Tarnowska area petitioned the Galician Railway of Archduke Charles Louis to build a railway line to Tarnobrzeg via Dąbrowa Tarnowska. However, the Galician Railway was not interested in such an investment. In 1887, the railway built a line from Dębica through Tarnobrzeg to Rozwadów, causing the concept of a railway through Dąbrowa Tarnowska to stall.

The plans for a railway line toward Szczucin and Dąbrowa Tarnowska were revived in the 1890s after the nationalization of the Galician Railway. Local landowners, including Prince Andrzej Lubomirski, whose wife owned significant estates near Szczucin, began efforts to build a railway line from Tarnów via Dąbrowa Tarnowska and Szczucin to Sandomierz. Deputies from the Tarnów Land repeatedly raised the matter of this railway route in the Diet of Galicia and Lodomeria. Initially, however, the assembly was not willing to engage in the construction of the line, and local governments and landowners could not raise enough funds for the project.

In 1898, the Austrian general staff showed interest in building a railway line to the north from Tarnów as the railway was deemed necessary for a potential military conflict with Russia. The railway project was shortened to a section from Tarnów to Szczucin, which still met the needs of landowners in the area. That same year, under Prince Lubomirski's leadership, a committee for building the Tarnów–Szczucin railway was formed, consisting of local entrepreneurs and landowners. Private investors and local governments pledged to purchase shares for about 100,000 and 400,000 Austro-Hungarian krones, though this amount was insufficient given the projected costs of 3,000,000 krones. Thanks to military factors, the Austrian government became involved in funding the project, purchasing shares worth 900,000 krones, while the Galician government guaranteed a loan of 2,000,000 krones.

In 1900, the plans for the new railway line were approved by the Diet of Galicia and Lodomeria. The Tarnów–Szczucin Railway Joint Stock Company was formed, which took a loan of 2,000,000 krones and issued shares worth 1,400,000 krones.

The concession for the construction and operation of the line was granted on 7 October 1905, and the concessionaire was Andrzej Lubomirski. Construction of the railway began in October of the same year, and work was carried out at a fast pace. The route was built according to the technical requirements specified in the 1880 local railway law, amended in 1894 and 1899. The cost of building the line amounted to 2,663,257 krones, and additional works and finishing tasks during operation cost an additional 261,449 krones. To service the route, in 1906 and 1908, the Tarnów–Szczucin Railway Joint Stock Company purchased three locomotives of the 97 kkStB series, two of which were transferred to the Polish State Railways after World War I and were assigned the numbers TKh12-10 and TKh12-11.

The new route was opened for use in October 1906, after 12 months of construction.

=== Austrian period and World War I ===
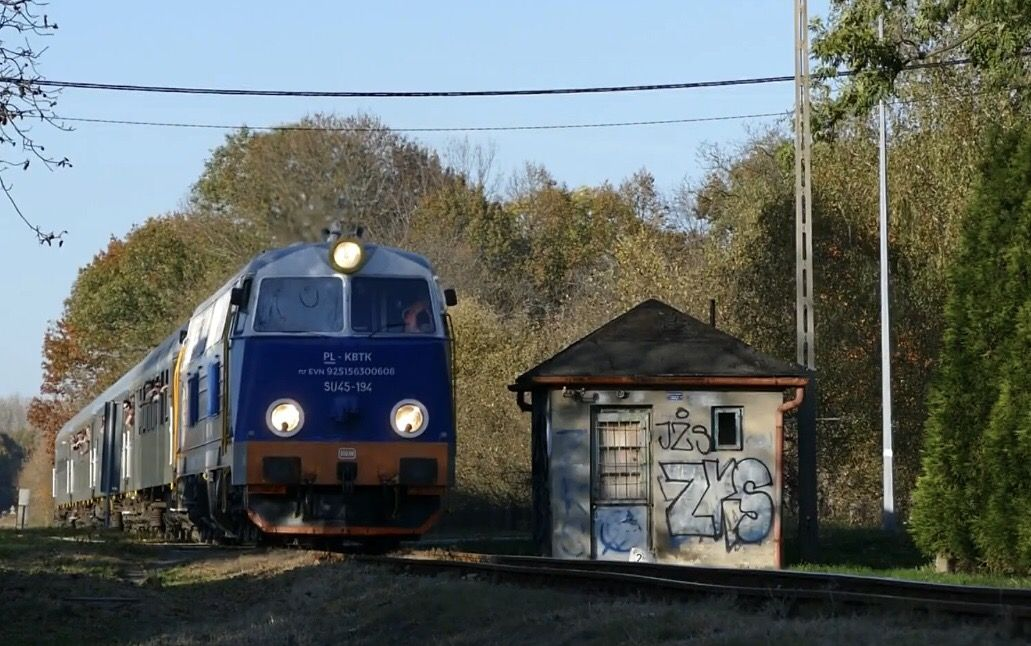
Special train in Tarnów

The railway was operated by the Imperial Royal Austrian State Railways and was under the administration of the Kraków Directorate ED Krakau. The railway's operations were widely criticized. The criticism stemmed from unsatisfactory travel conditions caused by uncomfortable carriages and weak locomotives, which struggled to cover the route in difficult weather conditions. Initially, the route had one pair of passenger trains and one mixed train, with an additional passenger train added in 1908.

In early November 1914, a narrow-gauge horse-drawn railway with a gauge of 715 mm was extended to the line from Staszów. The narrow-gauge railway reached the normal-gauge station in Szczucin via a temporary wooden bridge. In the same month, Szczucinka line came under Russian control and was converted to broad gauge. During their retreat in February 1915, the horse-drawn narrow-gauge bridge over the Vistula was burned, and the railway was intensively used for supplying the army and evacuating the wounded from the front, which had stopped nearby, at the Dunajec and Biała rivers. After the route was regained by the Austrians, the line was converted back to standard gauge, and train services were restored.

In 1916, a military narrow-gauge railway with a gauge of 700 mm was extended from Szczucin to Rytwiany, and then to Staszów. A temporary bridge was again built over the Vistula. The Szczucin railway station became a transshipment station from the standard-gauge railway to the narrow-gauge railway.

=== 1918–1945 ===
After Poland regained independence, the line became part of the Kraków Directorate of the Polish State Railways. Due to the poor condition of the bridge in Szczucin, narrow-gauge train services were suspended, and Szczucin ceased to be a transshipment station between standard and narrow-gauge railways for several years. After the construction of a new bridge over the Vistula in 1926, narrow-gauge trains resumed service to the Szczucin koło Tarnowa Wąskotorowy railway station, adjacent to the standard-gauge Szczucin station.

In 1930, the route from Tarnów to Szczucin was served by six pairs of passenger trains, three of which were operated with steam-powered carriages. The following year, due to the global economic crisis, the number of connections was reduced, and for the first time, the route was shortened to Dąbrowa Tarnowska.

In the second half of the 1930s, plans to expand the Central Industrial Region led to proposed railway upgrades in the region. Among the proposals was the construction of a line from Kielce through Busko-Zdrój to Mędrzechów, 83 km long, which would connect with the Tarnów route. In 1938, the plans were revised to include the construction of a Radom–Ostrowiec Świętokrzyski–Szczucin route. The existing lines from Warsaw to Radom and Tarnów to Szczucin were to be upgraded to double tracks, and electrification was also planned. However, these plans were not realized due to the outbreak of World War II.

From 1939, the Szczucin station once again lost contact with the narrow-gauge railway. The narrow-gauge trains no longer reached the town due to the poor condition of the bridge over the Vistula, which was later blown up in September. On 7 September 1939, the railway line was occupied by German troops. The line was not destroyed, nor was it a target of German airstrikes. In September of the same year, the line came under the jurisdiction of the Łódź Directorate of the German Reich Railways, and in October, it became part of the so-called Ostbahn under the Kraków Directorate.

In 1940/1941, the bridge over the Vistula in Szczucin was rebuilt, allowing the Szczucin station to once again become a junction with the Jędrzejów narrow-gauge railway. This situation lasted until 1945 when the Szczucin bridge was blown up again.

=== 1945–2007 ===
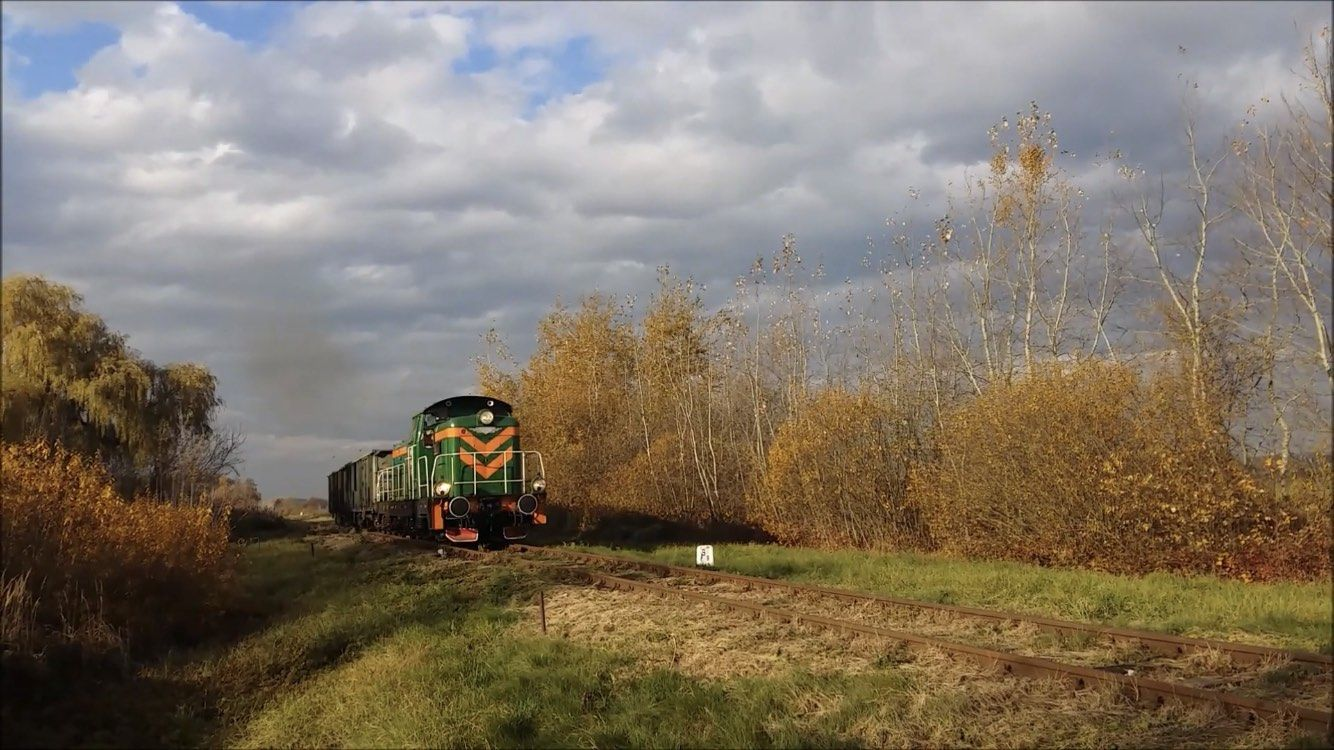
Freight train near Łukowa

In January 1945, the Szczucinka line was occupied and dismantled by Soviet troops. A few months later, in August, it was officially handed over to Polish authorities by the Soviet military. It became part of the Kraków Directorate of the Polish State Railways. In October 1946, after reconstruction, during which local residents were involved, the line was reopened.

In 1953, the railway was again connected to the narrow-gauge railway from Staszów, which had been converted to a 750 mm gauge. In the same year, the standard-gauge line to Busko-Zdrój was completed. Originally, this line was to lead to the station in Żabno, thus creating a connection that would shorten the route from central Poland to Tarnów and the border crossing in Leluchów. However, the construction of a large bridge over the Vistula river was a significant obstacle.

In the mid-1970s, SP42 locomotives were used to service passenger trains, and later, in the 1980s, 4-carriage double-decker trains of the Bipa series were introduced for traffic. In 1976, seven pairs of passenger trains operated on the line, with travel times ranging from 1 hour and 23 minutes to 1 hour and 25 minutes. At the end of May 1978, narrow-gauge train services across the Vistula in Szczucin were suspended and later discontinued, meaning the railway lost its connection with the Jędrzejów narrow-gauge line.

During the Polish People's Republic period, the railway carried workers daily to factories in Tarnów (chemical works, Zakłady Mechaniczne Tarnów, Tamel Electric Motor Factory), Niedomice (pulp mill), Dąbrowa Tarnowska (county hospital, offices, schools, food processing plants), and Szczucin (asbestos plants). After the political transformation in 1989 and the closure of factories, especially the asbestos industry in Szczucin and the Niedomice pulp mill, the importance and popularity of the Szczucinka railway significantly declined. The first signs of a decline in passenger transport appeared in 1991, when there were six pairs of trains. A few years later, in 1994, the number was reduced to five pairs. Double-decker carriages were replaced by compartmentless 120A-type carriages.

In 1997, the travel time was 1 hour and 7 minutes, the best in the line's history. However, this did not prevent further reductions in passenger services and their eventual complete suspension. Rail services could not compete with individual transport and buses, and income from tickets was much lower than expenses.

At the end of the railway's operation, attempts were made to save the line by installing experimental automatic passing loops at the Żabno and Dąbrowa Tarnowska stations. These were meant to reduce staffing and maintenance costs, allowing the connection to be maintained. However, the installation of these devices did not stop the suspension of passenger services, and the eventual cessation of all services on the Szczucinka.

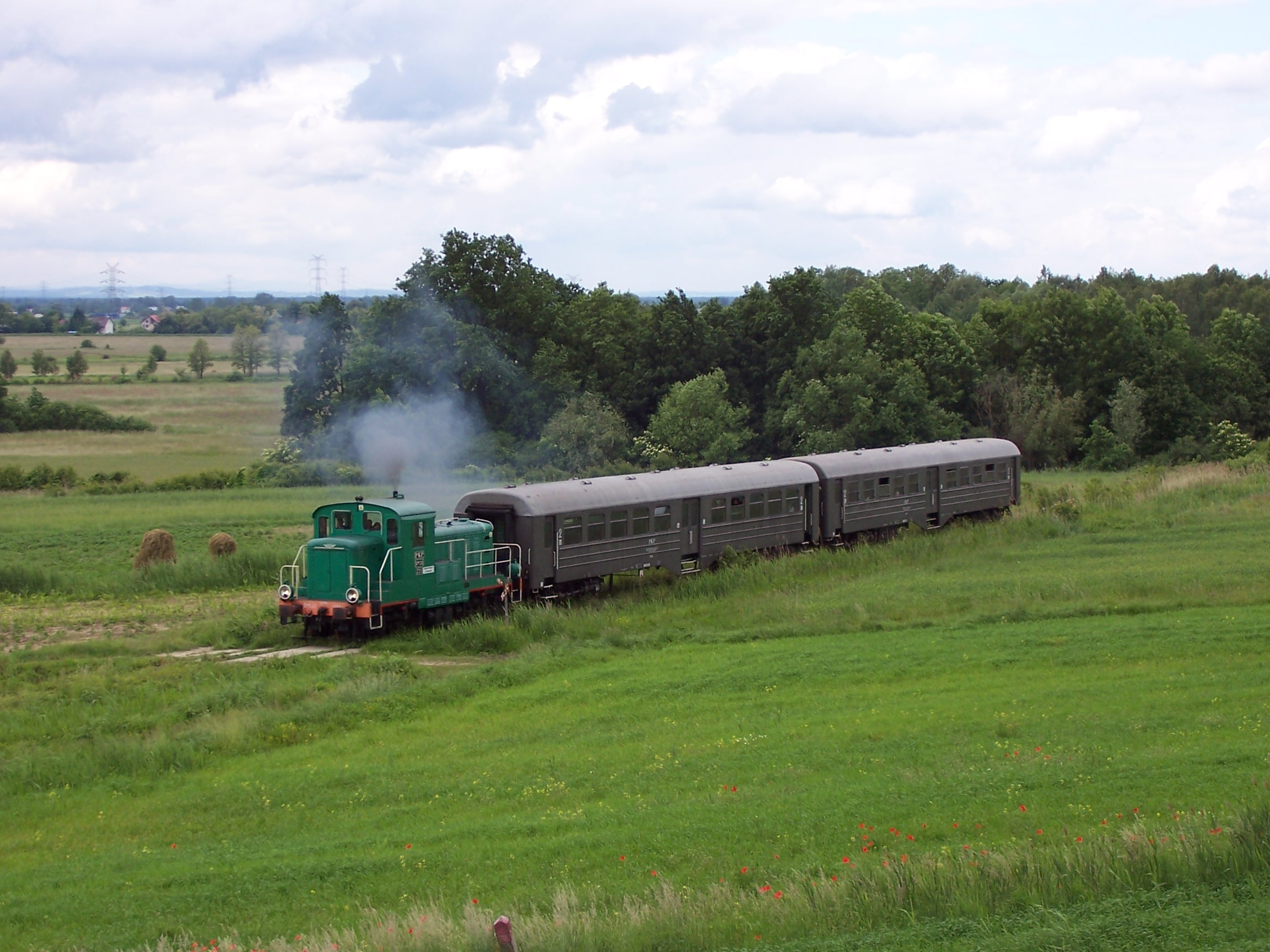
Passenger train on the Szczucinka line

Passenger services were suspended on 3 April 2000, and freight transport on the Żabno–Szczucin section ended in 2006.

Soon after the suspension of services, the local communities through which the railway passed sought an inexpensive way to revive passenger transport. Among the ideas was a light rail vehicle, the Mitor, designed by Włodzimierz Czyczuła, constructed from two connected Żuk delivery vehicles. The vehicle could carry 16 passengers and reach a speed of 60 km/h. It was tested on the Szczucinka line on 30 June, where it ran without any problems, but local authorities were not interested in this form of transport.

The last passenger train ran from Tarnów to Szczucin in June 2006, and the line was officially closed in 2007. Since then, traffic has continued only on the siding section from Tarnów to Żabno, spanning 16 kilometers.

=== After 2007 ===
After 2007, the Dąbrowa County negotiated the acquisition of the line from the Polish State Railways. However, the county authorities ultimately did not take over the railway due to unresolved legal issues concerning the line within Tarnów County (this concept was abandoned in 2011).

In March 2015, representatives of six municipalities along the railway line signed an agreement to jointly develop a bicycle route along the embankment of the inactive line. The 47-kilometer route was planned for completion by 2018, with an estimated investment cost of approximately 15 million PLN. However, the controversial project was not realized. In August 2016, following protests from residents living near the railway and actions taken by the Kraków Railway Enthusiasts Association, the decision to dismantle the inactive railway line was blocked.

Also in August 2016, the private railway operator SKPL submitted a proposal to the Lesser Poland Voivodeship Marshal's Office and the municipalities along the line to resume passenger and freight services, starting with the Tarnów–Dąbrowa Tarnowska section. During a meeting on 17 October at the county office, an agreement was reached between the operator, the counties along the line, and the Lesser Poland Voivodeship Marshal's Office regarding train operations, with officials agreeing to subsidize the operator. Simultaneously, negotiations were held with Polish State Railways to transfer or lease the line to local authorities. If the negotiations had been successful, SKPL declared that it would fund the line's renovation and resume operations within six months of signing the agreements.

In March 2018, it was reported in the media, including Radio Kraków, that the connections had not been resumed due to financial constraints, the withdrawal of co-financing by Tarnów and Żabno municipalities, and concerns among some local government authorities about the lack of sufficient passenger demand.

In September 2019, the first passenger trains in years ran on the Szczucinka line as part of the Lesser Poland Railway Tourism Trails initiative. Steam-powered trains traveled the route from Tarnów to Żabno. This event was repeated in subsequent years, attracting significant interest.

== Train operations ==
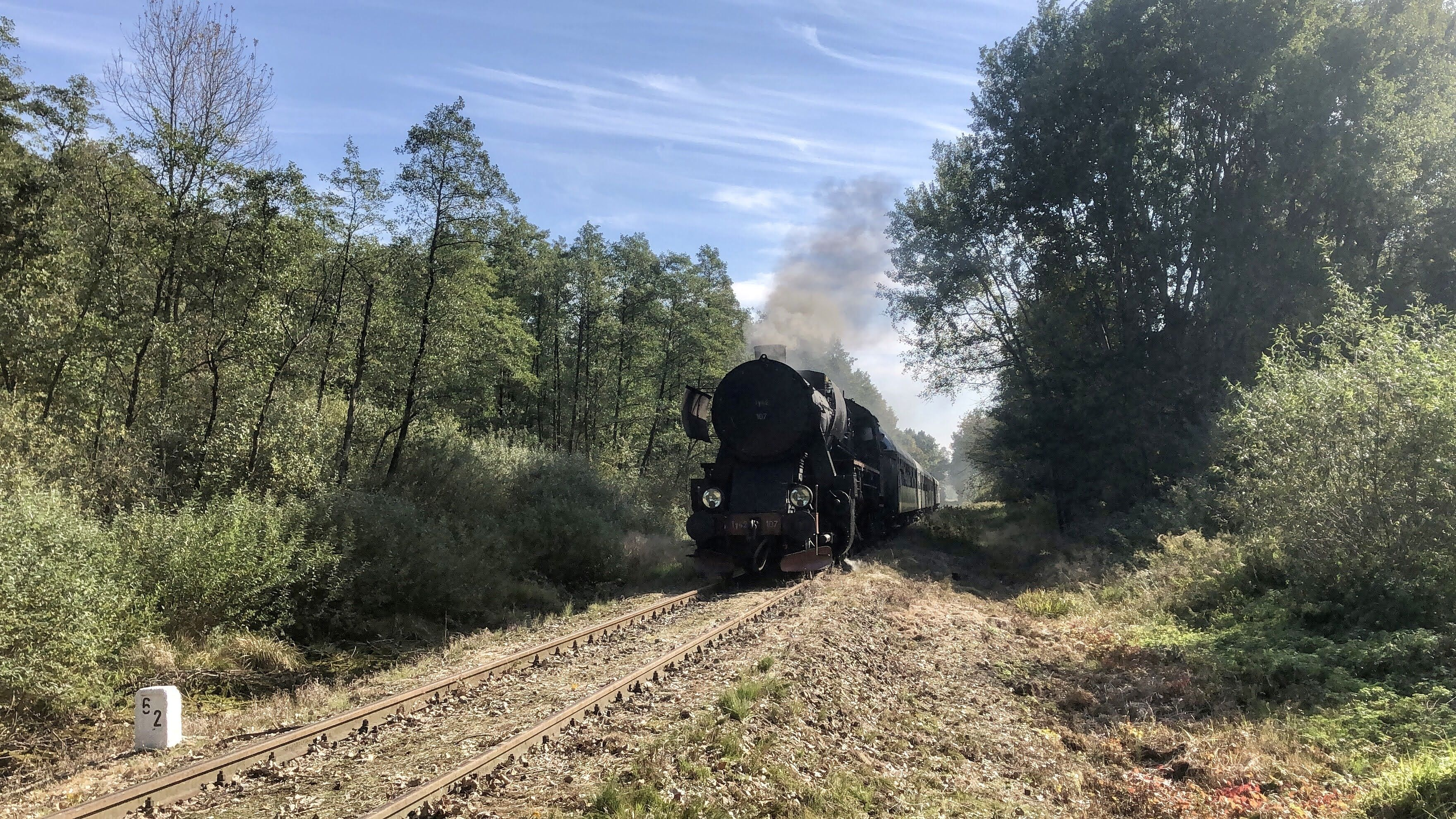
Heritage train pulled by Ty42 locomotive in Krzyż

In 2021, no scheduled passenger services were operated on the line; however, sporadic freight traffic was conducted on the operational section. Since 2019, heritage trains pulled by steam locomotives have appeared on the line.

== Plans for the future ==
In August 2018, a plan was developed to reactivate the railway line and extend it to Busko-Zdrój as part of the planned construction of the Central Communication Port and the creation of a rail connection for Central Communication Port passengers from Tarnów via Kielce. The new connection, which would pass through Żabno, would bypass Dąbrowa Tarnowska and Szczucin. However, in October 2018, Mikołaj Wild, the Deputy Minister of Infrastructure and Government Plenipotentiary for the construction of the Central Communication Port, did not rule out the reactivation of the railway line to Dąbrowa Tarnowska in connection with the Central Communication Port construction. In addition, the connection was planned to be part of a route linking Warsaw, Tarnów, and Nowy Sącz with Budapest.

The Regulation of the Council of Ministers of 29 April 2019, amending the regulation concerning the list of railway lines of national importance, includes the former railway line no. 115 along with the Sitkówka-Nowiny–Busko-Zdrój railway and the planned section Busko-Zdrój–Tarnów, marking it in its entirety as railway line no. 73. The regulation entered into force on 29 May 2019.

In 2020, the modernization of the Tarnów–Szczucin line was included in the investment program for the Polish State Railways from 2021 to 2030, with a perspective extending to 2040.
