= Kraków Zabłocie–Kraków Bonarka railway =

Railway line in Poland

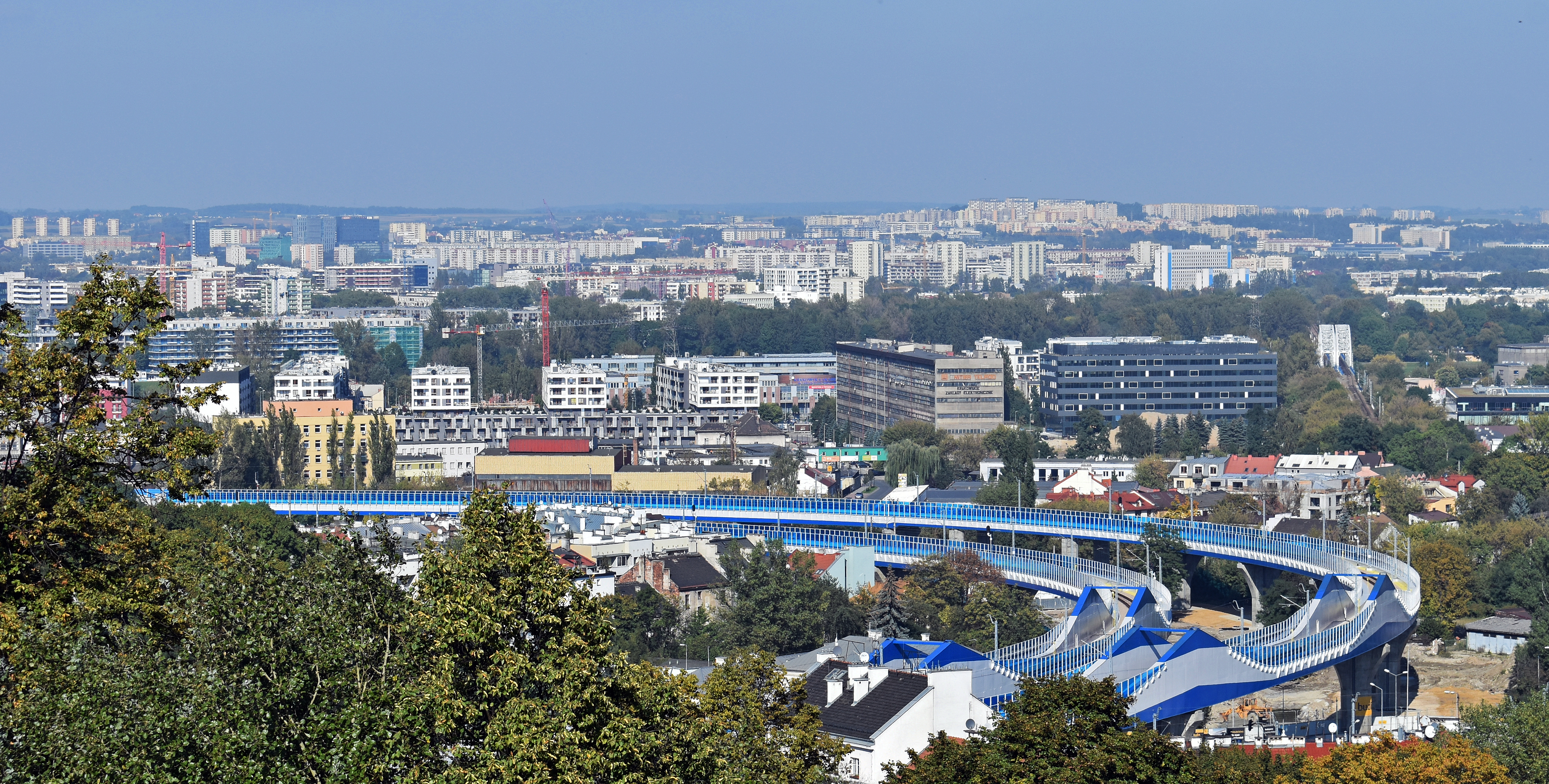
- View from Krakus Mound of the overpasses over Wielicka Street and the Greater Poland Insurgents and the Silesian Insurgents avenues

Overview
- Owner: PKP Polskie Linie Kolejowe
- Line number: 624
- Termini: Kraków Zabłocie; Kraków Bonarka

History
- Opened: 2017

Technical
- Line length: 3.161 km (1.964 mi)
- Track gauge: 1,435 mm (4 ft 8 1/2 in)
- Operating speed: 60 km/h (37 mph)

Kraków Zabłocie–Kraków Bonarka railway is a double-track railway in Kraków. The contract for its construction was signed on 16 September 2015, and regular train traffic began on 10 December 2017. The connector allows trains to leave Kraków in a southwestern direction while bypassing Kraków Płaszów railway station and platform No. 2 of Kraków Podgórze railway station (which operated under the name Kraków Krzemionki until 9 December 2017).

== Route ==
The connector links the Kraków Zabłocie railway station, located on Kraków Główny–Medyka railway, with Kraków Bonarka railway station (including the Kraków Podgórze railway station) on Kraków Płaszów–Oświęcim railway. It enables train travel from Kraków Główny to Zakopane, Oświęcim, and Skawina while bypassing Kraków Płaszów railway station.

== History ==
=== Construction ===
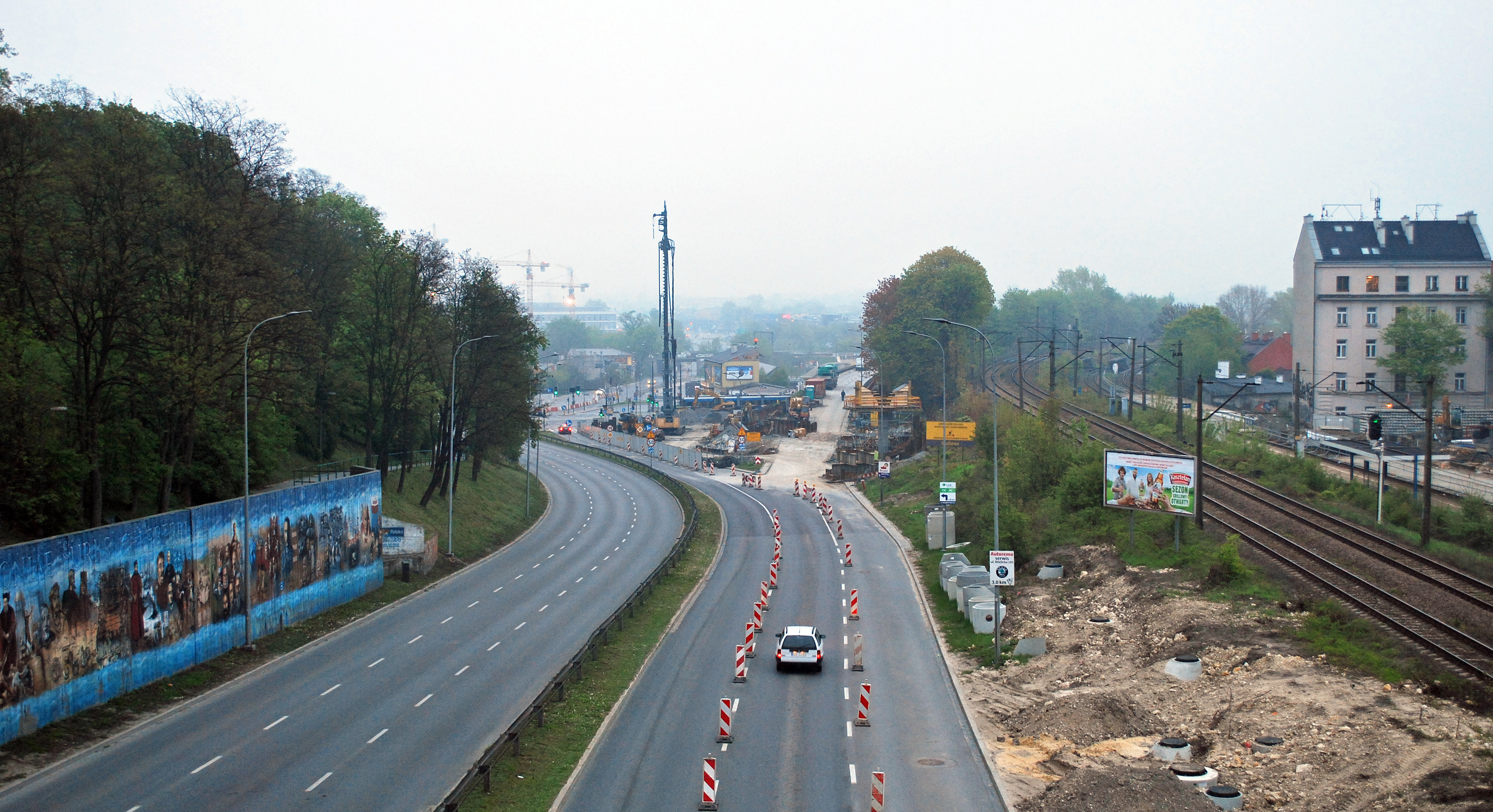
Railway under construction

On 16 September 2015, PKP Polskie Linie Kolejowe signed a contract with a consortium of Budimex and Ferrovial Agroman for the construction of a railway connector between the Kraków Zabłocie railway station and the Kraków Bonarka railway station, along with the reconstruction of the Kraków Zabłocie and Kraków Krzemionki railway stations. The consortium subcontracted KZN Rail for the strictly railway-related work. The investment was estimated at 258 million PLN, with completion planned for the second half of 2017.

On 23 September 2015, due to the construction of the connector, the Kraków Zabłocie railway station was closed. The first few months were dedicated to preparatory work, including demolitions and the construction of some supports. In February 2016, reconstruction began on track No. 1 of Kraków Główny–Medyka railway near the Kraków Zabłocie railway station, covering approximately 500 meters, along with an insertion for the future turnout allowing access to the connector. On 12 March 2016, the Obrońców Lwowa overpass was closed to vehicular traffic, and a day later, the Kraków Krzemionki railway station was also closed.

On 6 April 2016, the first steel structure elements were delivered to the construction site, and the assembly of spans began. In June, construction of the platform at the Kraków Krzemionki railway station was completed, allowing it to reopen on 24 June 2016.

By early September 2016, 27 of the 30 pillars and 18 of the 28 steel spans were completed, with five more spans finished by the end of the month. By December 2016, all supports and spans were in place.

By August 2017, the viaduct and tracks were completed, while finishing work continued at the railway stations.

=== Operations ===
On 20 October 2017, a technical train run took place with the participation of the Minister of Infrastructure and Construction, the President of PKP Polskie Linie Kolejowe, and journalists. The official opening was held on 7 December, with the presence of the Deputy Minister of Infrastructure and Construction. On 9 December, the first scheduled train, TLK Uznam to Zakopane, ran along the line, and the following day, with the introduction of the new timetable, regular train services commenced.

Immediately after the opening of the connector, the travel time for long-distance trains between Kraków Główny and Kraków Bonarka was reduced by about 15 minutes. However, not all long-distance trains were redirected to the new connector due to the division of trains into wagon groups at the Kraków Płaszów railway station. For passenger trains running between Kraków Główny and Skawina, the travel time was reduced from 40–45 minutes to 22–30 minutes, as the need for transfers or changing the front of the train at Płaszów was eliminated.

On 22 March 2018, due to ongoing modernization works in the Kraków railway junction and the start of works on Skawina–Żywiec railway, train services through Kraków Zabłocie–Kraków Bonarka railway were suspended.

== Railway stations ==
Name of the railway station	Photo	Number of platforms	Number of platform edges	Infrastructure
Kraków Zabłocie (railway station and branch signal station)		2	4	under-track passage
Kraków Podgórze		2	3	-
Kraków Bonarka		2	4	overhead passage

== Engineering structures ==
Both tracks of the connector run on separate viaducts, supported by 30 pillars, with the highest pillar being 14 meters tall. The distances between the pillars range from 31 to 81 meters. The smallest radius of the track curve is 258 meters, which required the use of Y-type railroad ties.

== Train operations ==
The line is primarily used by trains connecting Kraków with Skawina on the SKA 2 Rapid Urban Railway line. It is also used by regional trains on longer routes as well as long-distance PKP Intercity trains.

== Awards ==
- 2018 – title of "Bridge Work of the Year 2017" awarded by the Polish Association of Bridge Engineers.
