= Rzeszów Główny railway station =

Railway station in Rzeszów, Poland

Coordinates: 50.0428°N 22.0069°E

Rzeszów Główny
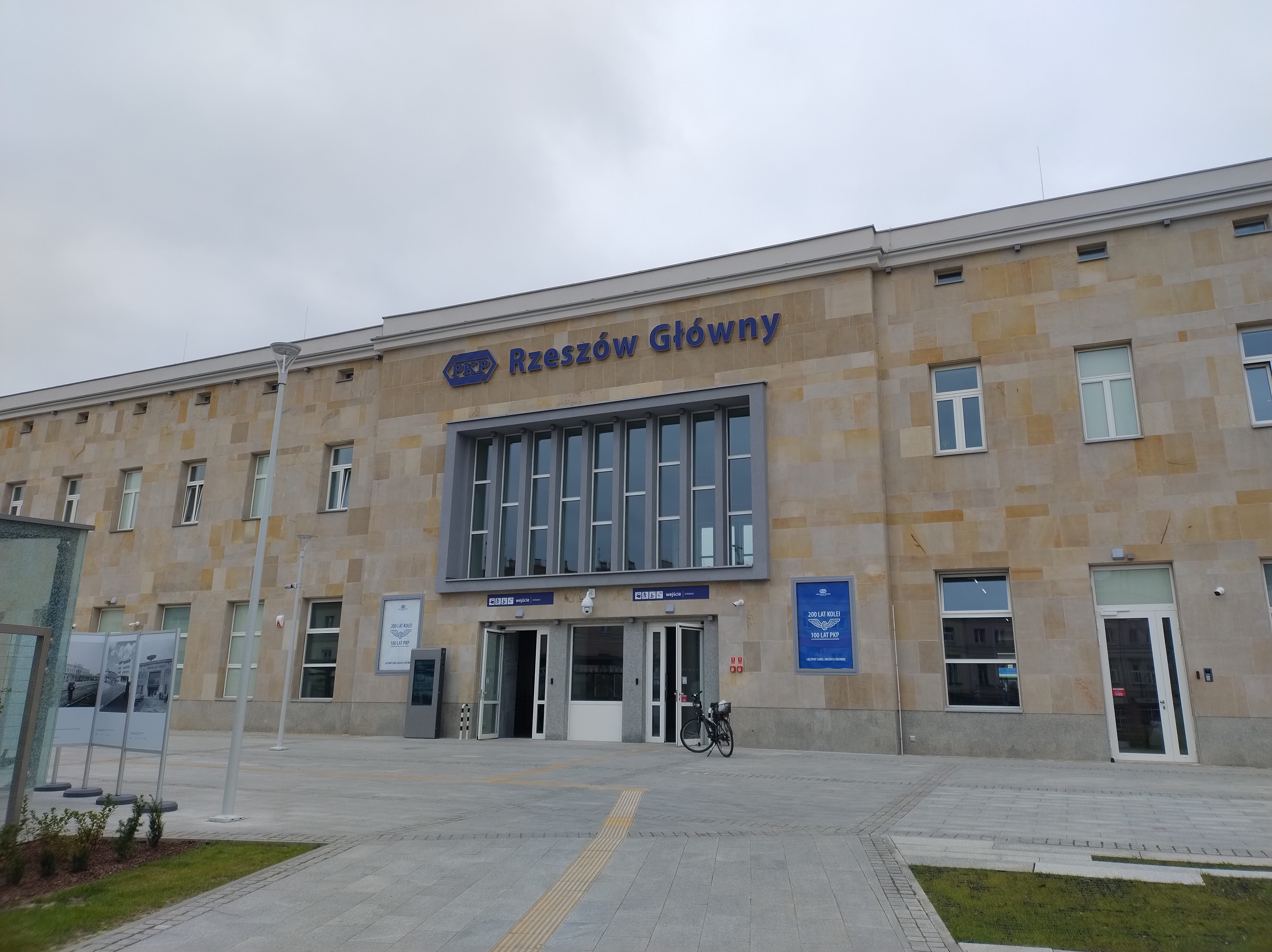

General information
- Location: Rzeszów, Subcarpathian Voivodeship; Poland
- System: Railway Station
- Owner: Polskie Koleje Państwowe S.A.
- Platforms: 5

History
- Opened: 1858
Location

Rzeszów Główny (lit. 'Rzeszów Main') is the main railway station of the south-eastern Polish city of Rzeszów, and the biggest of the Subcarpathian Voivodeship.

== History ==
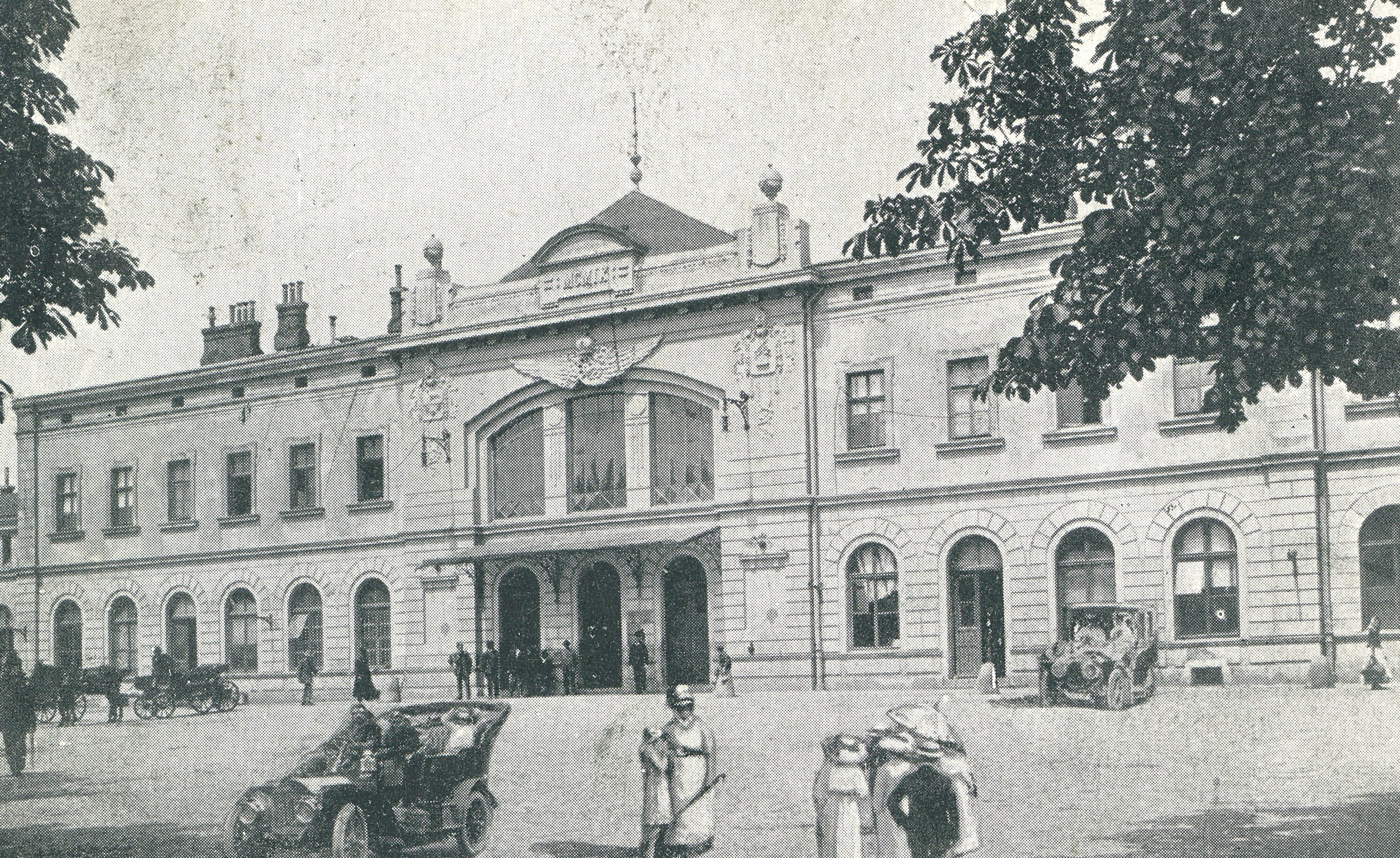
The station ca 1910

The first railway station in Rzeszów was built in 1858 on the newly constructed line of the Galician Railway of Archduke Charles Louis from Kraków which eventually reached Lviv in 1861. The station was initially supposed to be located further outside the town to the north in the village of Zaczernie, however ultimately it was placed just north of the town square, creating a u-shaped bend on the railway.

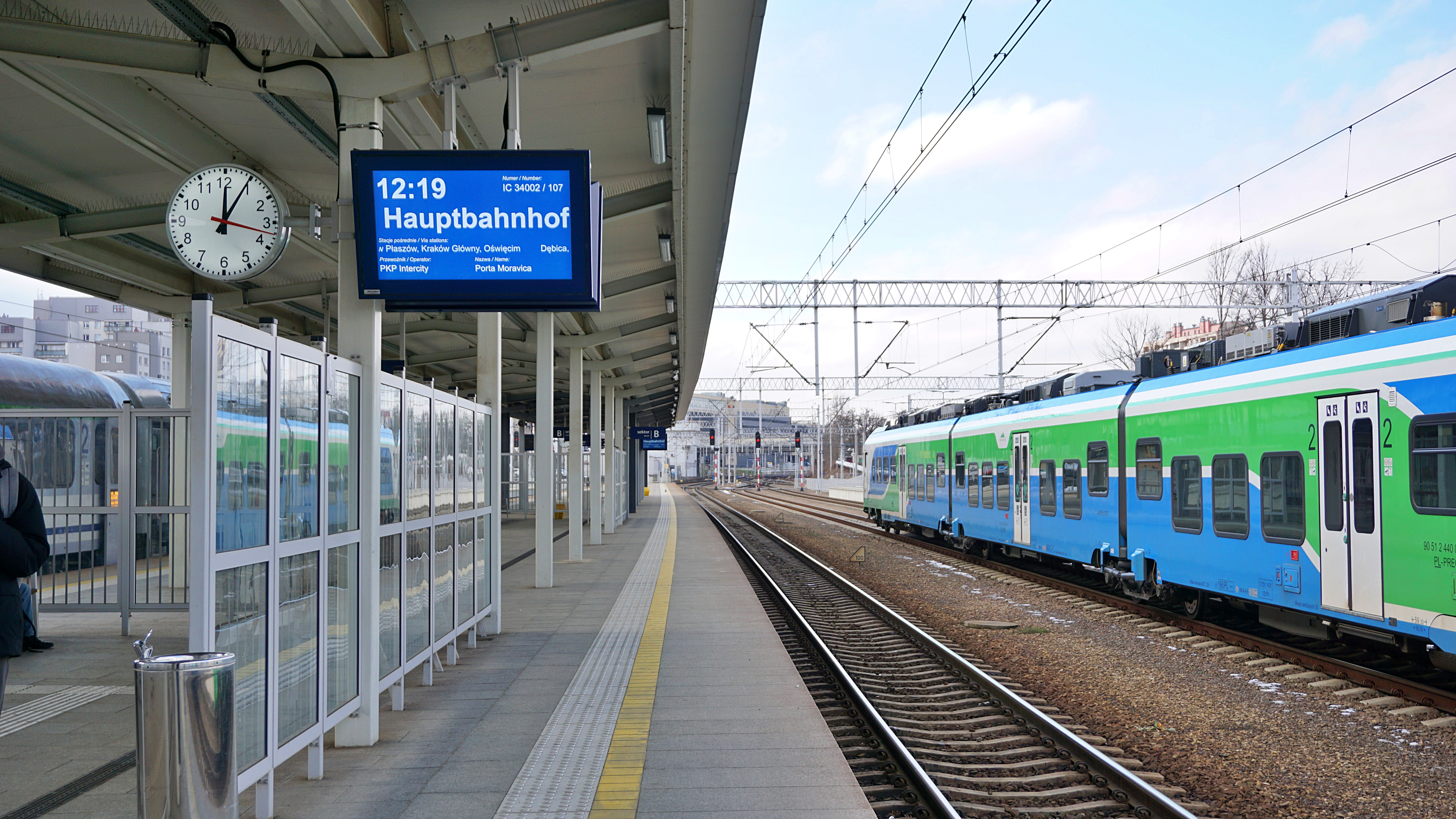
Platform 2, direction Tarnów

In subsequent years, Rzeszów became an important railway junction, with additional connections to Jasło (southbound), and Tarnobrzeg's district of Ocice (northbound). During World War I, the station was destroyed by the retreating Russian Imperial troops. Rebuilt during the interwar period, it was destroyed again in 1944 by the Wehrmacht. The current complex was built after 1945.

Since 2018 the station platforms are undergoing an upgrade, which is scheduled to be completed in 2021.

The station offers connections to all the major cities in Poland, as well as to Kyiv and Lviv in Ukraine.

== Train services ==
The station is served by the following service(s):

- EuroCity services (EC) (EC 95 by DB) (IC by PKP) Berlin - Frankfurt (Oder) - Rzepin - Wrocław – Katowice – Kraków – Rzeszów – Przemyśl
- Express Intercity Premium services (EIP) Gdynia- Warsaw - Kraków - Rzeszów
- Intercity services (IC) Zielona Góra - Wrocław - Opele - Częstochowa - Kraków - Rzeszów - Przemyśl
- Intercity services (IC) Ustka - Koszalin - Poznań - Wrocław - Katowice - Kraków - Rzeszów - Przemyśl
- Regional services (PR) Tarnów - Dębica - Rzeszów
- Regional services (PR) Kraków - Bochnia - Tarnów - Dębica - Rzeszów
- Regional services (PR) Tarnów - Dębica - Rzeszów - Jarosław - Przemyśl
- Regional services (PR) Rzeszów - Kolbuszowa - Stalowa Wola Południe
- Regional services (PR) Rzeszów - Kolbuszowa - Stalowa Wola Południe - Lublin
- Regional services (PR) Rzeszów - Strzyżów nad Wisłokiem - Jasło
- Regional services (PR) Rzeszów - Łańcut - Przeworsk
- Regional services (PR) Rzeszów - Łańcut - Przeworsk - Jarosław - Przemyśl
- Regional services (PR) Rzeszów - Łańcut - Przeworsk - Jarosław - Przemyśl - Medyka
- Regional services (PR) Rzeszów - Łańcut - Przeworsk - Jarosław - Horyniec-Zdrój
- Regional services (PKA) Rzeszów - Dębica
- Regional services (PKA) Rzeszów - Kolbuszowa
- Regional services (PKA) Rzeszów - Strzyżów nad Wisłokiem
- Regional services (PKA) Rzeszów - Łańcut - Przeworsk

Preceding station	PKP Intercity	Following station
Dębica towards Berlin Hbf	EuroCity EC 95; IC	Łańcut towards Przemyśl Główny
Dębica towards Gdynia Główna	EIP	Terminus
Sędziszów Małopolski towards Zielona Góra Główna	IC	Łańcut towards Przemyśl Główny
Dębica towards Ustka	IC	Łańcut towards Przemyśl Główny
Preceding station	Polregio	Following station
Rzeszów Zachodni towards Kraków Główny	PR	Terminus
Rzeszów Zachodni towards Tarnów	PR	Terminus
Rzeszów Zachodni towards Stalowa Wola Południe or Lublin Główny	PR	Terminus
Rzeszów Staroniwa towards Jasło	PR	Terminus
Rzeszów Zachodni towards Tarnów	PR	Rzeszów Załęże towards Przemyśl Główny
Terminus	PR	Rzeszów Załęże towards Przeworsk, Przemyśl Główny or Medyka
Terminus	PR	Rzeszów Załęże towards Horyniec-Zdrój
Preceding station	PKA	Following station
Rzeszów Zachodni towards Dębica	Rzeszów - Dębica	Terminus
Rzeszów Zachodni towards Kolbuszowa	Rzeszów - Kolbuszowa	Terminus
Rzeszów Staroniwa towards Strzyżów nad Wisłokiem	Rzeszów - Strzyżów nad Wisłokiem	Terminus
Terminus	Rzeszów - Przeworsk	Rzeszów Załęże towards Przeworsk
