= Subcarpathian Agglomeration Railway =

Rail operator in south eastern Poland

- Podkarpacka Kolej Aglomeracyjna
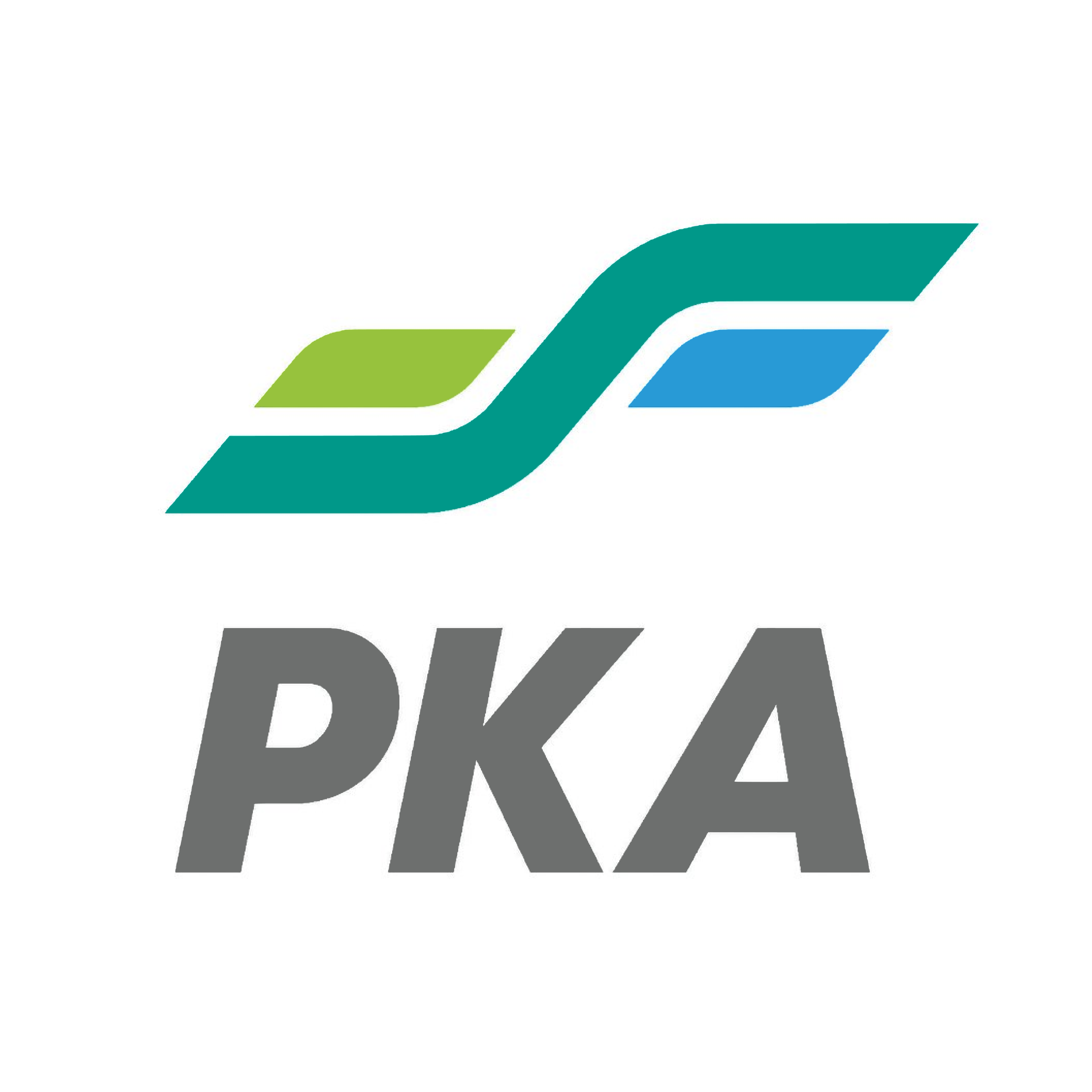

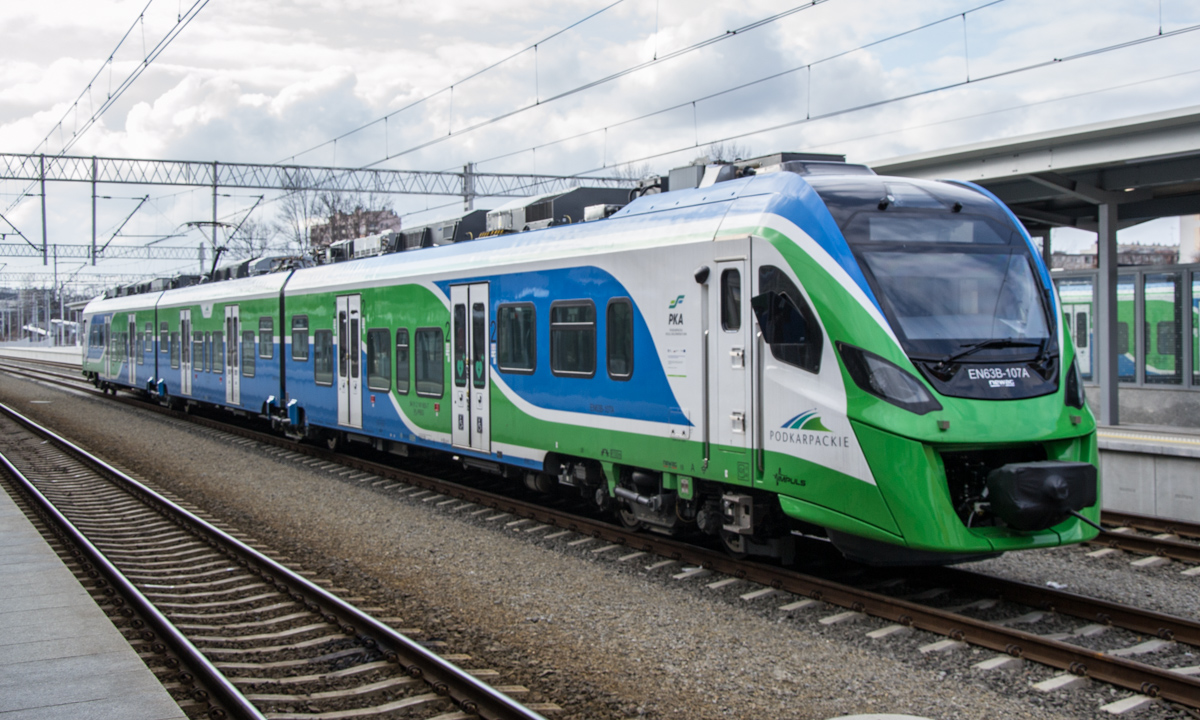
- EN63B-107

Overview
- Operator: Polregio
- Main route: Rzeszów Główny
- Fleet: 10
- Headquarters: Rzeszów, Poland
- Reporting mark: PR
- Locale: Subcarpathian Voivodeship
- Dates of operation: 2021–present

The Subcarpathian Agglomeration Railway (Polish: Podkarpacka Kolej Aglomeracyjna) is a regional railway system, connecting Rzeszów's residential areas with the Rzeszów Główny railway station, and providing rail connections to Rzeszów–Jasionka Airport, and the nearest towns: Strzyżów, Przeworsk, Dębica, and Kolbuszowa. The connections are operated by Polregio.

For the needs of PKA, railway line no. 626 connecting Rzeszów–Jasionka Airport with railway line no. 71 and several railway stops were built.

The Subcarpathian Agglomeration Railway launched its services on January 1, 2021.

The network was established so that regional centres within Subcarpathian Voivodeship can be connected to the capital Rzeszów with all-day two-way frequent services, complementing Polregio services.

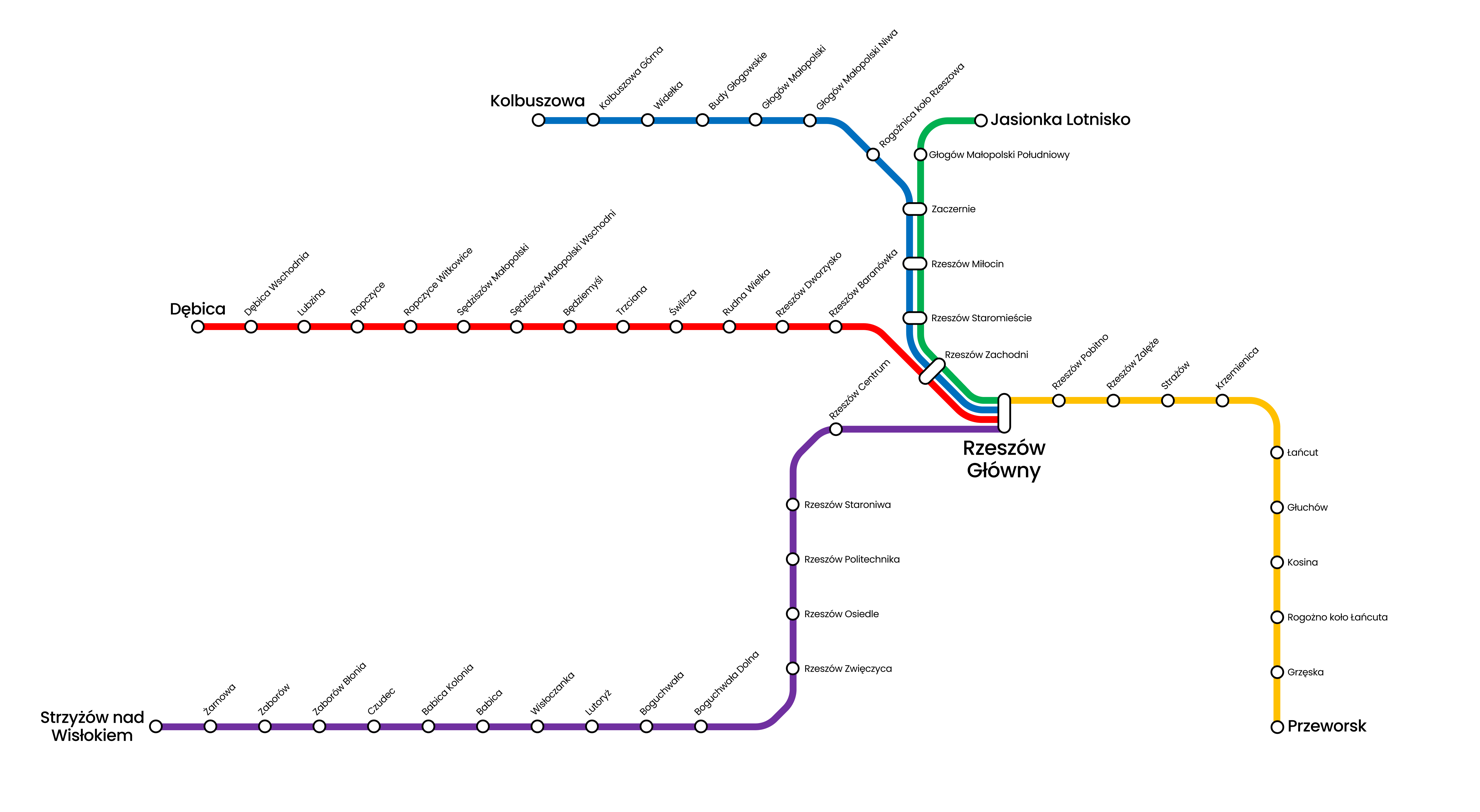
PKA connections scheme (04.07.2025)

== Routes ==
Rzeszów - Strzyżów
Km	Stop name	City
0,000	Rzeszów Główny	Rzeszów
0,643	Rzeszów Centrum	Rzeszów
1,534	Rzeszów Staroniwa	Rzeszów
2,920	Rzeszów Politechnika	Rzeszów
3,568	Rzeszów Osiedle	Rzeszów
5,980	Rzeszów Zwięczyca	Rzeszów
7,621	Boguchwała Dolna	Boguchwała
8,985	Boguchwała	Boguchwała
11,335	Lutoryż	Lutoryż
13,015	Wisłoczanka	Zarzecze
15,312	Babica	Babica
17,526	Babica Kolonia	Babica
20,373	Czudec	Czudec
23,009	Zaborów Błonia	Zaborów
25,057	Zaborów	Zaborów
28,600	Żarnowa	Strzyżów
30,990	Strzyżów nad Wisłokiem	Strzyżów

Rzeszów - Dębica
Km	Stop name	City
0,000	Rzeszów Główny	Rzeszów
1,740	Rzeszów Zachodni	Rzeszów
3,136	Rzeszów Baranówka	Rzeszów
5,309	Rzeszów Dworzysko	Rzeszów
7,252	Rudna Wielka	Rudna Wielka
10,144	Świlcza	Świlcza
14,241	Trzciana	Trzciana
19,600	Będziemyśl	Będziemyśl
23,249	Sędziszów Małopolski Wschodni	Sędziszów Małopolski
25,702	Sędziszów Małopolski	Sędziszów Małopolski
30,609	Ropczyce-Witkowice	Ropczyce
33,876	Ropczyce	Ropczyce
37,759	Lubzina	Lubzina
43,629	Dębica Wschodnia	Pustynia
46,925	Dębica	Dębica

Rzeszów - Przeworsk
Km	Stop name	City
0,000	Rzeszów Główny	Rzeszów
2,191	Rzeszów Pobitno	Rzeszów
5,079	Rzeszów Załęże	Rzeszów
8,483	Strażów	Strażów
13,885	Krzemienica	Krzemienica
16,672	Łańcut	Łańcut
20,528	Głuchów	Głuchów
23,601	Kosina	Kosina
26.376	Rogóżno koło Łańcuta	Rogóżno
32,932	Grzęska	Grzęska
36,817	Przeworsk	Przeworsk

Rzeszów - Kolbuszowa
Km	Stop name	City
0,000	Rzeszów Główny	Rzeszów
1,740	Rzeszów Zachodni	Rzeszów
2,402	Rzeszów Staromieście	Rzeszów
3,877	Rzeszów Miłocin	Rzeszów
6,145	Zaczernie	Zaczernie
8,670	Rogoźnica koło Rzeszowa	Głogów Małopolski
10,855	Głogów Małopolski Niwa	Głogów Małopolski
12,103	Głogów Małopolski	Głogów Małopolski
15,960	Budy Głogowskie	Budy Głogowskie
20,015	Widełka	Widełka
26,342	Kolbuszowa Górna	Kolbuszowa Górna
29,420	Kolbuszowa	Kolbuszowa

Rzeszów - Jasionka (airport)
Km	Stop name	City
0,000	Rzeszów Główny	Rzeszów
1,740	Rzeszów Zachodni	Rzeszów
2,402	Rzeszów Staromieście	Rzeszów
3,877	Rzeszów Miłocin	Rzeszów
6,145	Zaczernie	Zaczernie
8,731	Głogów Małopolski Południowy	Głogów Małopolski
11,293	Jasionka Lotnisko	Jasionka
