= Ustka railway station =

Railway station in Ustka, Poland

Ustka
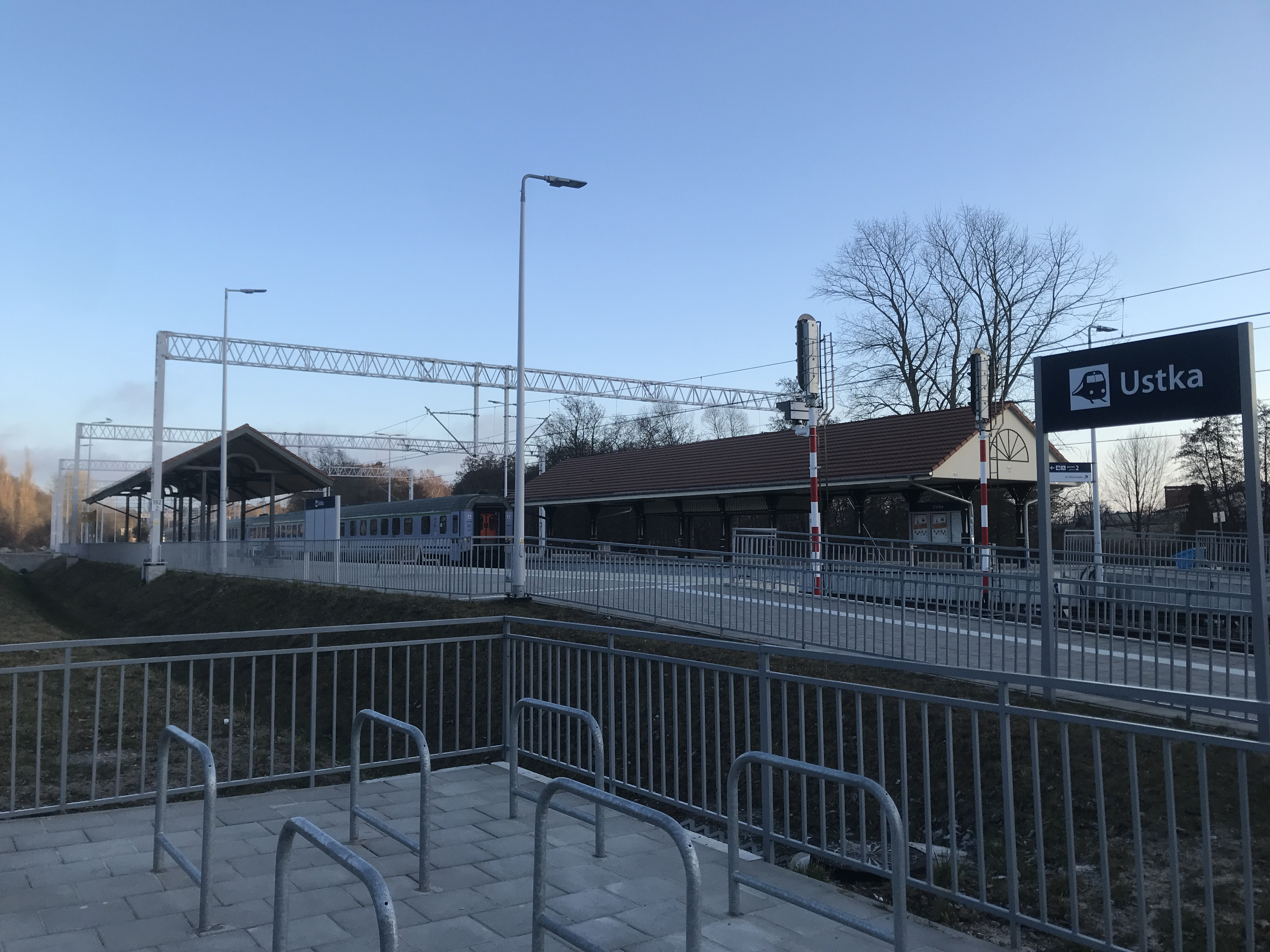
- Currently two platforms are in use

General information
- Location: Ustka, Pomeranian Voivodeship; Poland
- Coordinates: 54°34′44″N 16°51′39″E
- Owner: Dworzec Polski S.A.
- Platforms: 3
- Tracks: 3

History
- Opened: 1911
- Rebuilt: 2019-2021
- Former names: Stolpmünde

Services
Preceding station	PKP Intercity	Following station
Terminus	IC	Słupsk towards Bielsko-Biała Główna
Terminus	IC	Słupsk towards Przemyśl Główny
Preceding station	Polregio	Following station
Charnowo Słupskie towards Słupsk	PR	Ustka Uroczysko Terminus
Location

Ustka railway station is in Ustka in the Pomeranian Voivodeship, Poland. According to the PKP classification the station is category D, meaning it has fewer than 300,000 passengers annually.

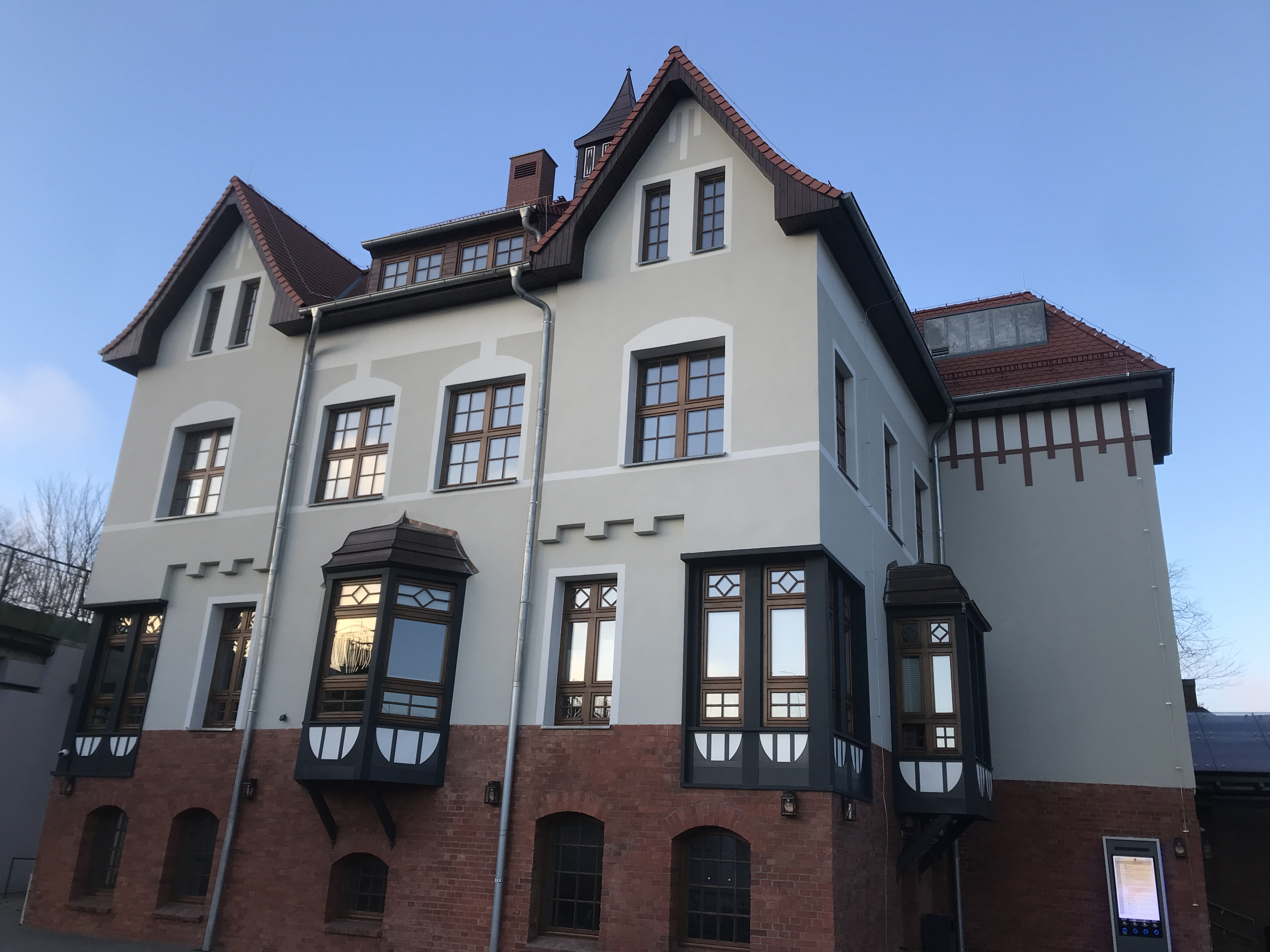
The building of the railway station after renovation.

== Train services ==
The station is served by the following services:

- Intercity services (IC) Ustka - Koszalin - Poznań - Wrocław - Opole - Bielsko-Biała
- Intercity services (IC) Ustka - Koszalin - Poznań - Wrocław - Katowice - Kraków - Rzeszów - Przemyśl
- Regional services (R) Słupsk — Ustka Uroczysko
