= Przemyśl Główny railway station =

Railway station in Subcarpathia, Poland

Przemyśl Główny
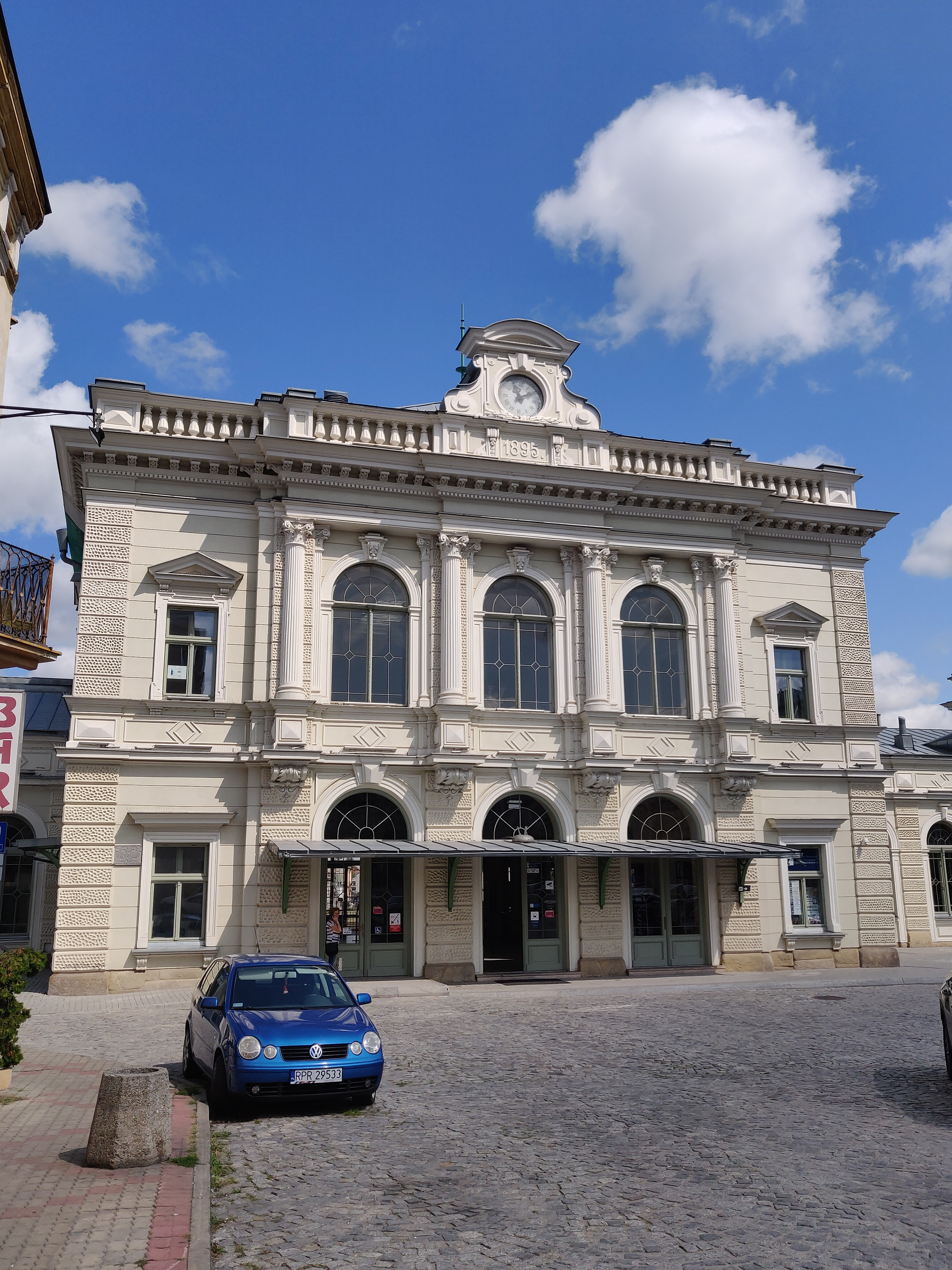
- Przemyśl Główny station building in 2021

General information
- Location: Plac Legionów 1; 37-700 Przemyśl; Poland
- Coordinates: 49°47′02″N 22°46′36″E
- System: Railway Station
- Platforms: 5
- Tracks: 9

History
- Opened: 1860
Location
- Location within Subcarpathian Voivodeship Location within Poland Location within Europe

Przemyśl Główny (Polish for Przemyśl main station) is the chief railway station serving the city of Przemyśl, in the Subcarpathian Voivodeship, Poland.

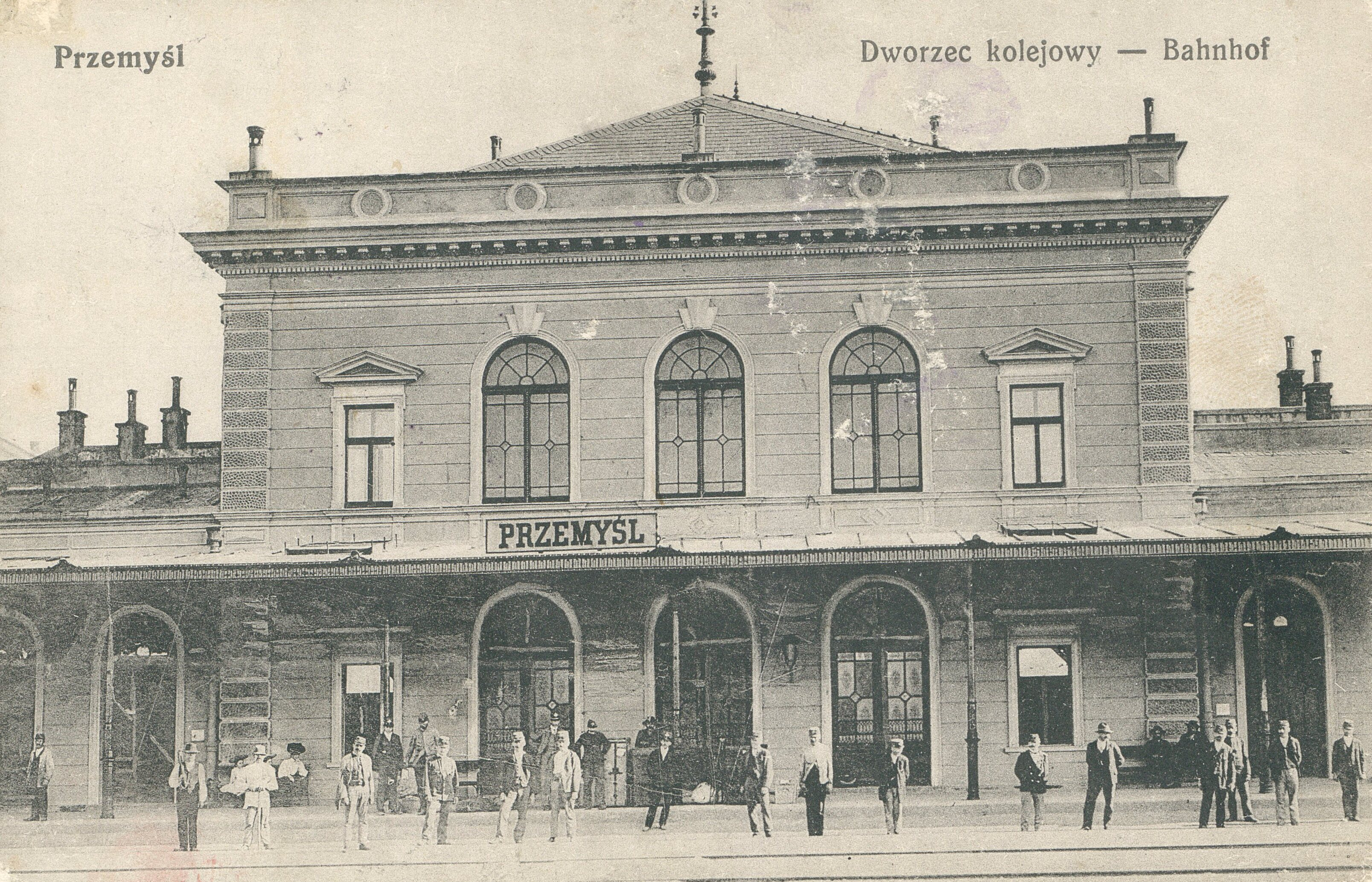
The station ca 1915

The station was opened in 1860 as part of the Galician Railway of Archduke Charles Louis and is located about 15 km (9.3 mi) from the border with Ukraine at Medyka-Shehyni. It has standard gauge tracks for connections to the rest of Poland (PKP rail lines 91, 102 and 615), as well as broad gauge tracks for the connection with Ukraine (PKP rail line 92). Hence it serves as an important junction between the railway systems of Poland and Ukraine.

After the 2022 Russian invasion of Ukraine it has become an important transfer point for refugees leaving Ukraine, with about 500,000 refugees passing through the station in the first month of the war.

The station serves a wide range of regional, domestic, and international connections. As of the end of 2025, it maintained direct services to seven European capitals: Berlin, Bratislava, Budapest, Kyiv, Prague, Warsaw, and Vienna.

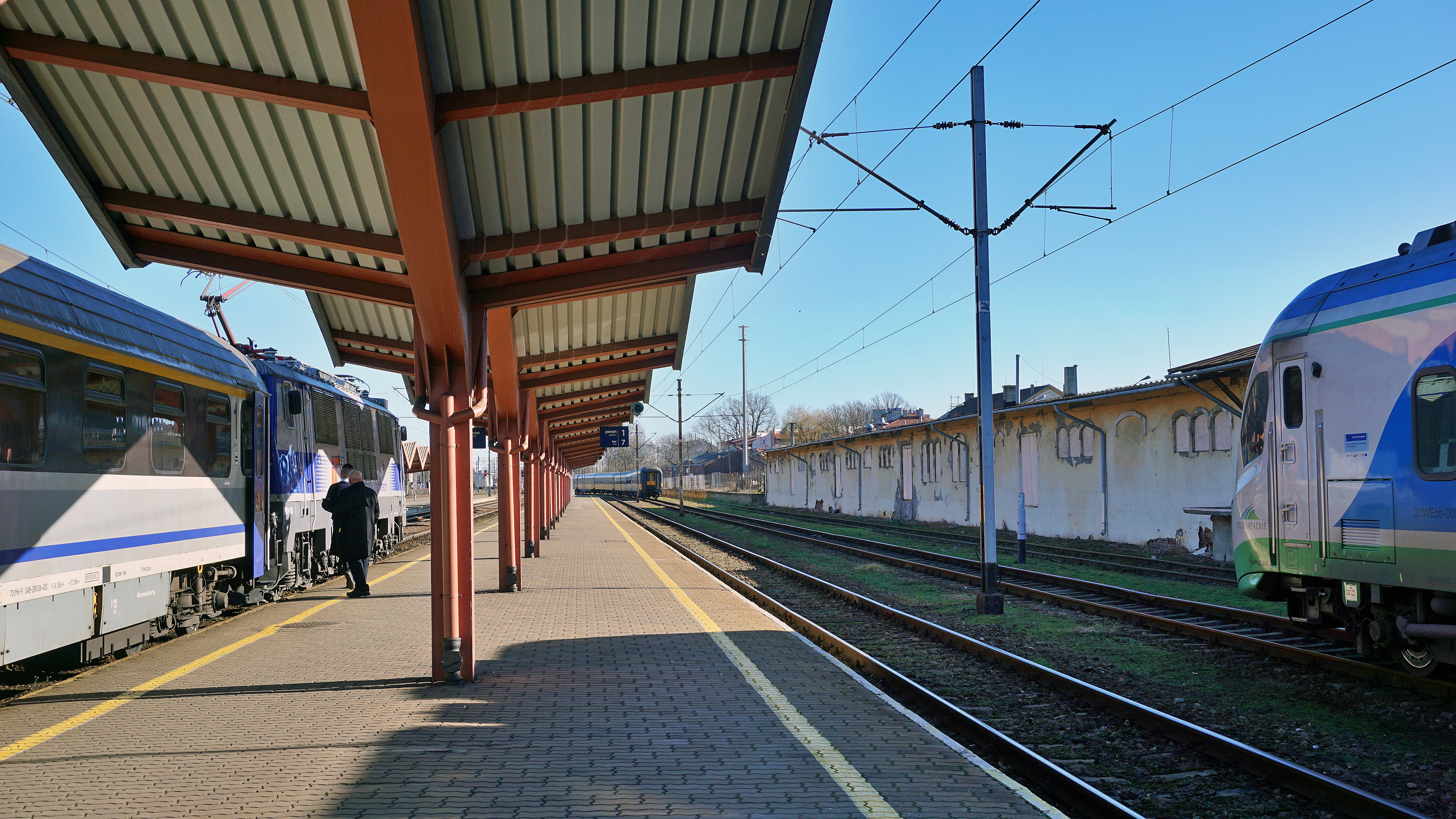
View east towards Medyka.

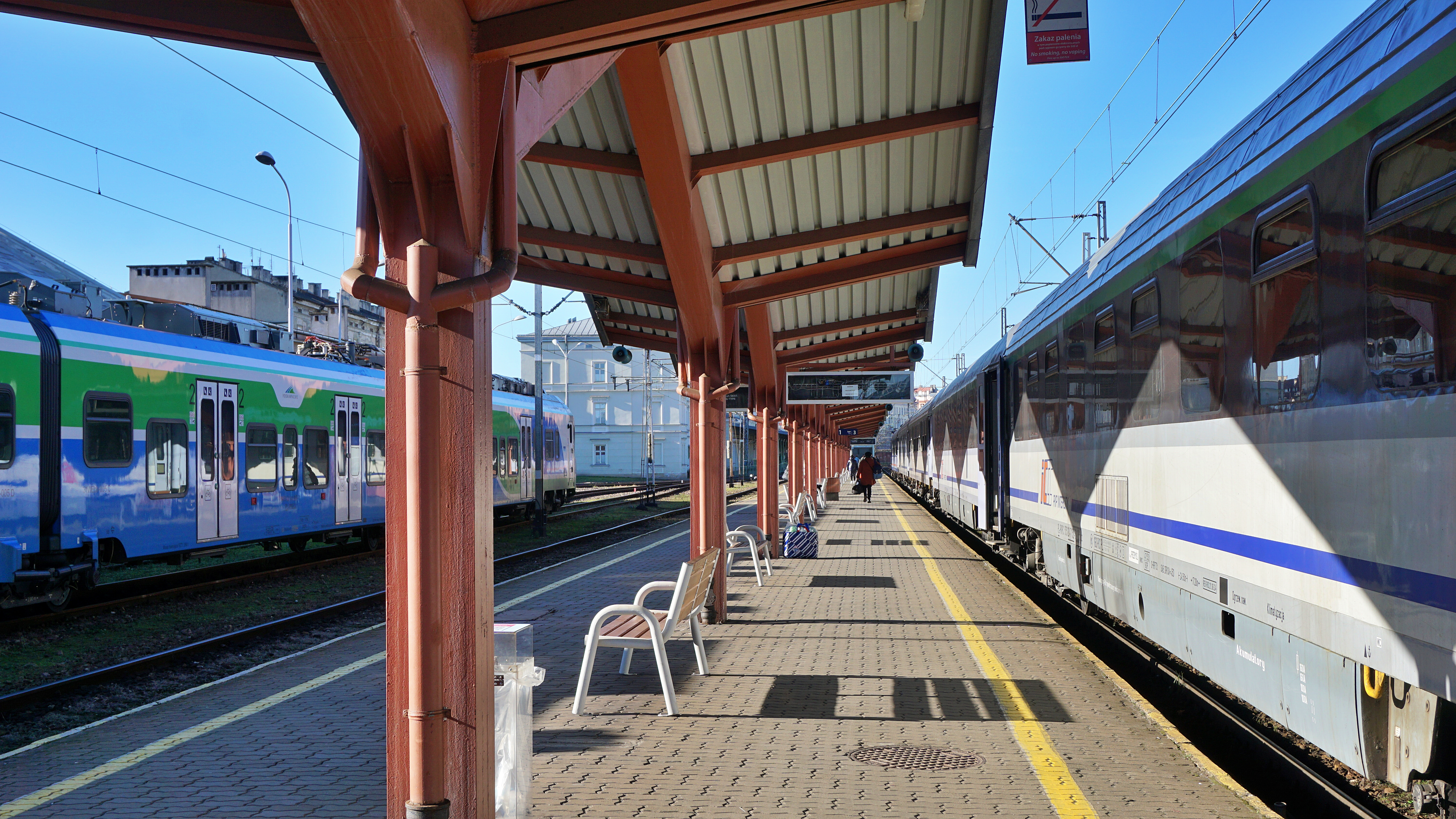
View west towards Rzeszów.
