= Sycewice railway station =

Railway station in Sycewice, Poland

Sycewice

General information
- Location: Sycewice; Poland
- Owner: Polskie Koleje Państwowe S.A.
- Line: 202: Stargard Szczeciński - Gdańsk Główny

History
- Former names: Zitzewitz

Services
Preceding station	Polregio	Following station
Wrześnica towards Darłowo	PR	Reblino towards Słupsk
Wrześnica towards Koszalin or Kołobrzeg	PR	Reblino towards Słupsk
Wrześnica towards Szczecin Główny	PR	Reblino towards Słupsk
Location

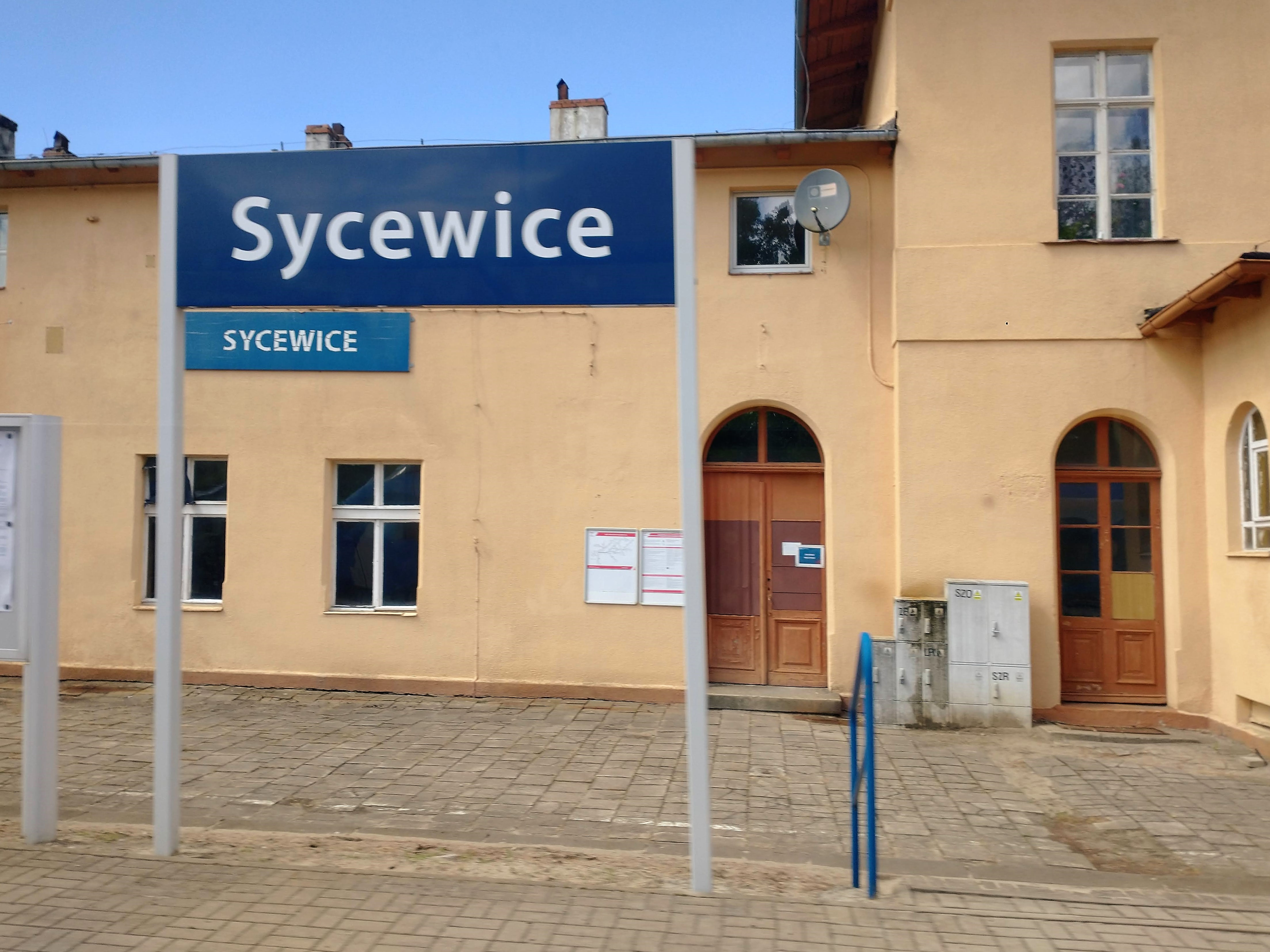
Shot of station front

Sycewice is a PKP railway station in Sycewice (Pomeranian Voivodeship), Poland.

== Lines crossing the station ==
Start station	End station	Line type
Gdańsk Główny	Stargard Szczeciński	Passenger/Freight

== Train services ==
The station is served by the following services:

- Regional services (R) Słupsk — Koszalin
- Regional services (R) Słupsk — Koszalin — Kołobrzeg
- Regional services (R) Słupsk — Koszalin — Szczecin Główny
- Regional services(R) Słupsk — Darłowo
