= Transport in Kraków =

Bus and tramway lines in Kraków, Poland

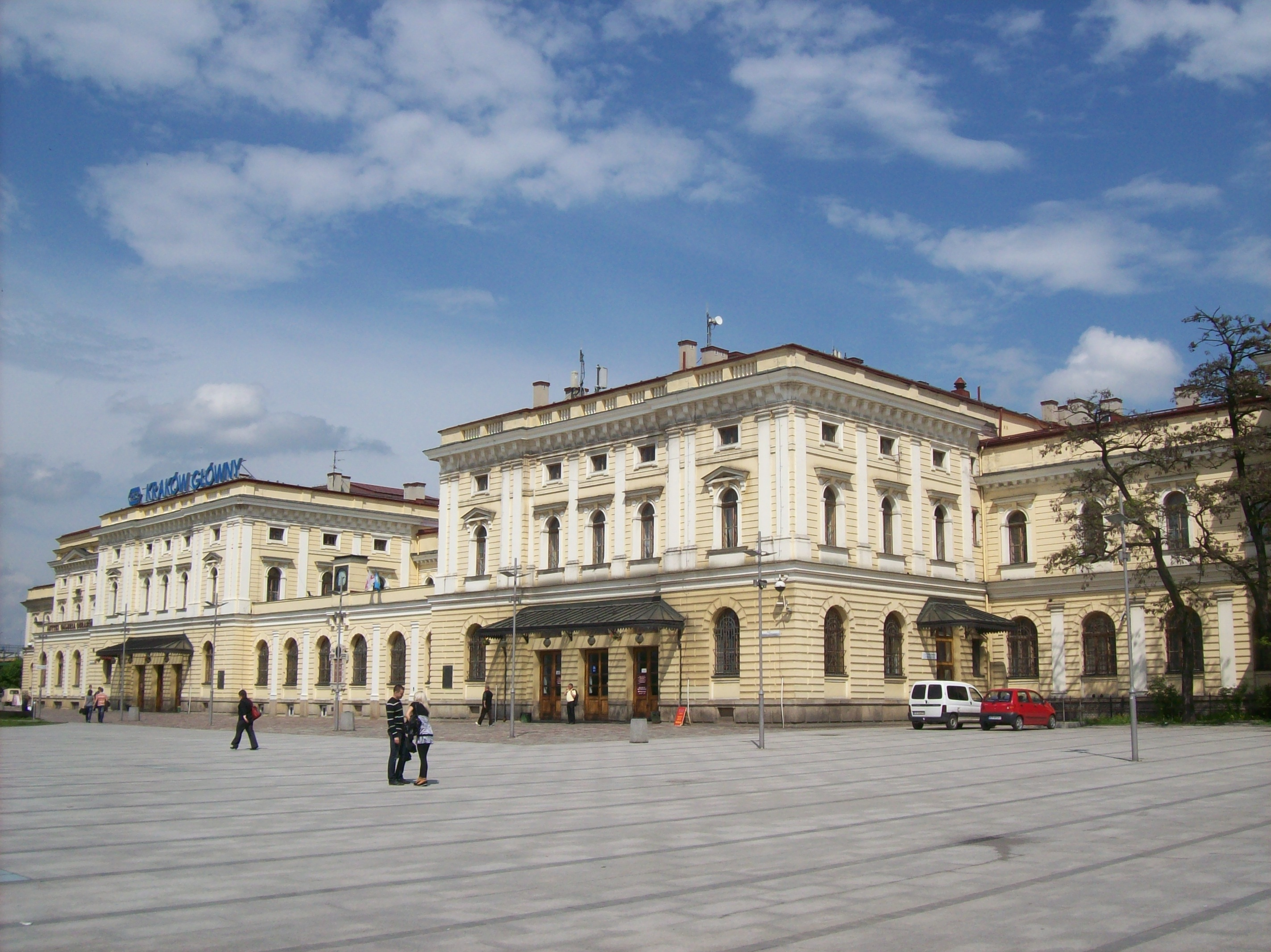
Kraków Main railway station

Transport in Kraków is based around a fairly dense network of tramway and bus lines operated by a municipal company, supplemented by a number of private minibus operators. Local trains connect some of the suburbs. The bulk of the city’s historic area has been turned into a pedestrian zone with golf buggies, rickshaws and horse buggies; however, the tramlines run within a three-block radius. Rail connections are available to most Polish cities. Trains to Warsaw depart every hour. International destinations include Berlin, Bratislava, Prague, Hamburg, Lviv, Kyiv, and Odesa (June–September). The main railway station is located just outside the Old Town District and is well-served by public transport.

There is an international airport 11 km (7 mi) west of the city. Direct trains cover the route between the main railway station and the airport in 18 minutes.

== International Airport ==
Kraków's airport, (John Paul II International Airport Kraków-Balice, Polish: Międzynarodowy Port Lotniczy im. Jana Pawła II Kraków-Balice) is 11 km (7 mi) west of the city. Direct trains cover the route between Kraków Main station and the airport in 16 minutes, following an upgrade of tracks on the line in 2015. https://pol.sika.com/pl/realizacje/modernizacja-linii-kolejowej-krakow-balice.html.. The annual capacity of the airport is estimated at 1.3 million passengers; however, in 2007 more than 3.042 million people used the airport, giving Kraków Airport 15 percent of all air passenger traffic in Poland. The passenger terminal is undergoing extension and is being adapted to meet the requirements of the Schengen Treaty.

== Kraków Main railway station ==
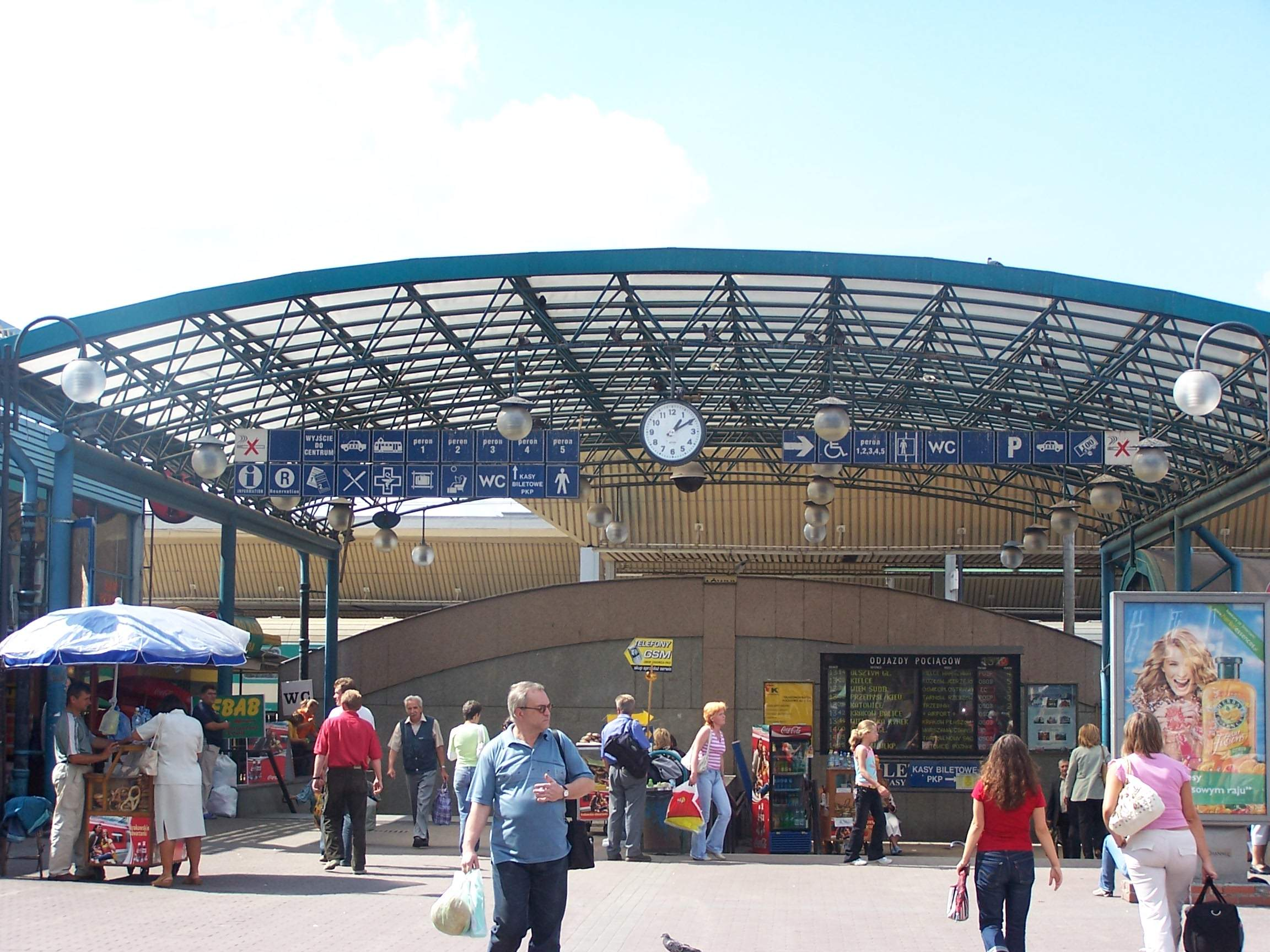
Eastern entrance to the station

Kraków Main railway station (Polish: Kraków Główny, commonly called Dworzec Główny) is the largest and the most centrally located railway station in Kraków. The building, constructed between 1844 and 1847 (architect: P.Rosenbaum), is parallel to the tracks. The station was initially a terminus of the Kraków – Upper Silesia Railway (Kolej Krakowsko-Górnośląska, German: Obeschlesische-Krakauer Eisenbahn). The design was chosen to allow for future line expansion. Trains entered the trainshed via an archway in a brick wall at the northern end of the station.

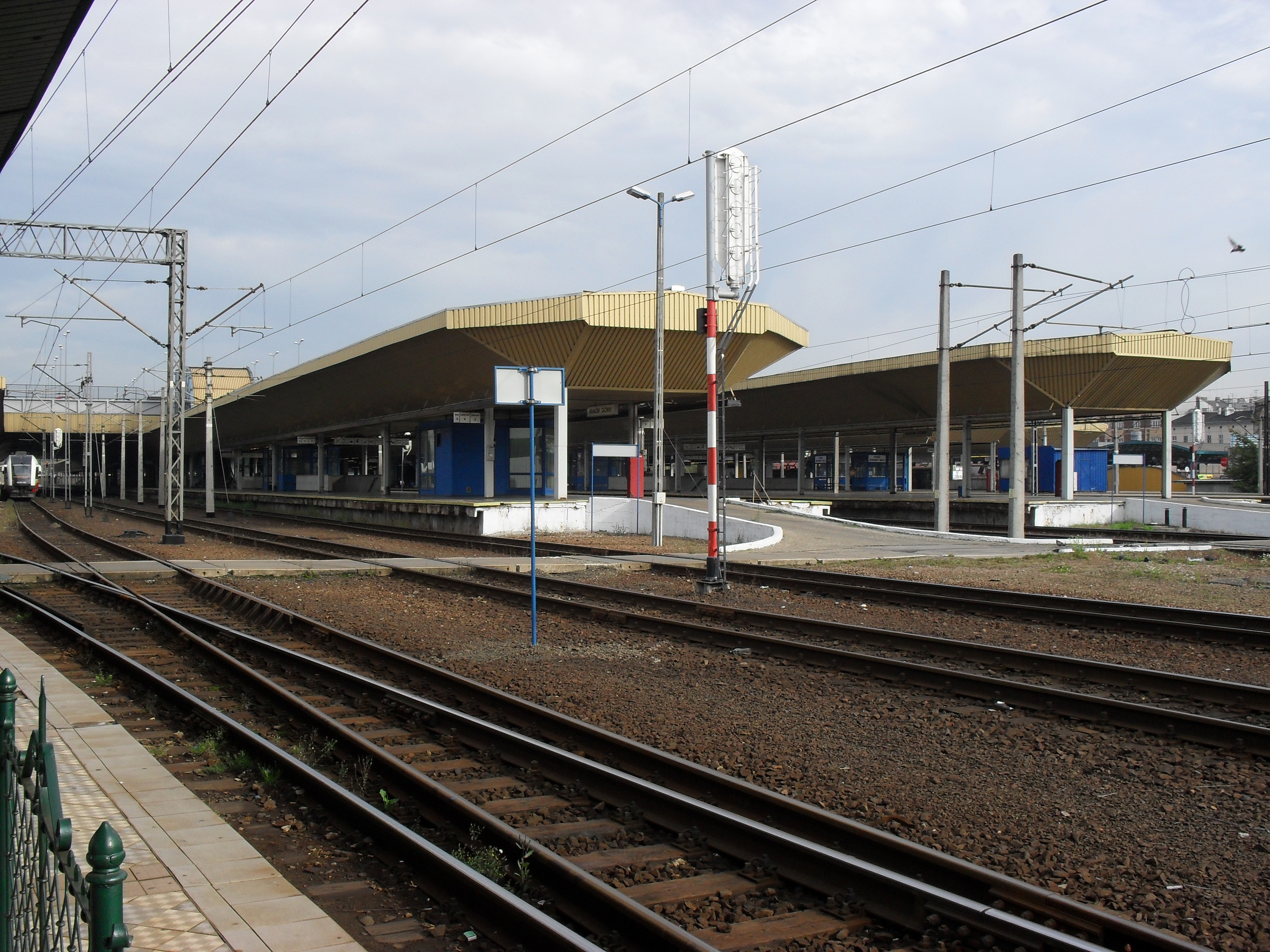
The new Kraków Główny station.

The station opened on 13 October 1847, with the first train leaving for Mysłowice (the point where the Austrian, German and Russian Empires adjoined during their military partitions of Poland).

When the railway line was extended eastwards by the Galician Railway of Archduke Charles Louis (the first section, to Dębica, then Dembitz in the Habsburg Empire, opened in 1856). The increasing traffic resulted in the station being modernized and enlarged in stages between 1869 and 1894. The next substantial expansion took place in the 1930s. At that time the northern brick wall and trainshed were demolished, the latter replaced by individual platform roofs.

A new transport interchange was developed which included a coach station and an underground fast tram line. A new shopping center (Galeria Krakowska, Kraków Gallery) opened in September 2006. The construction of the Galeria Krakowska and remodeling of the area in front of the main station building means that taxis are no longer able to drive up to the station building, instead they can drive to the parking situated directly above railway tracks and connected by lifts and steps with platforms and underground ticket hall.

== Tram system ==
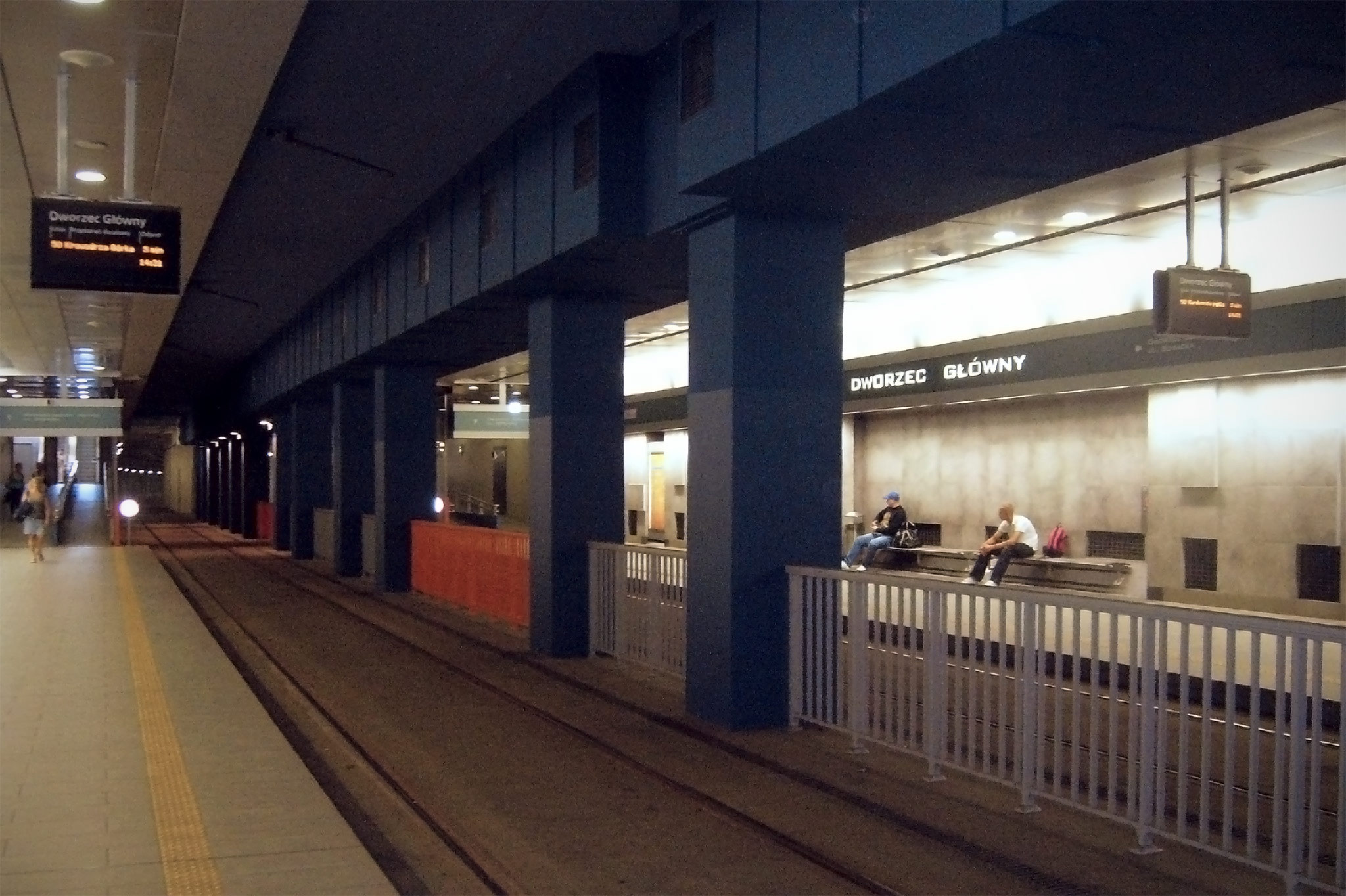
Dworzec Główny Tunel underground station

The Kraków Fast Tram system, KST (Polish Krakowski Szybki Tramwaj) is a premetro/tram system connecting northern and southern parts of the city. Currently two lines of KST are in operation. Line 50 operates between Kurdwanów in the district of Podgórze Duchackie which is south of Vistula River, and Krowodrza Górka in Krowodrza, north of the river. Line 52 operates between Czerwone Maki P+R in the district of Dębniki and Osiedle Piastów in the district of Mistrzejowice

Works on a tunnel for trams in the main railway station area started in 1974 and the 1.538 kilometer-long tunnel was finally opened on 12 December 2008.

Dworzec Główny Tunnel is an underground station directly connected to the platforms of the main railway station and to the Galeria Krakowska shopping mall.

Politechnika is an underground station located near the campus of the Cracow University of Technology.

In July 2010, MPK placed an order for a further 24 Bombardier Flexity Classic trams.

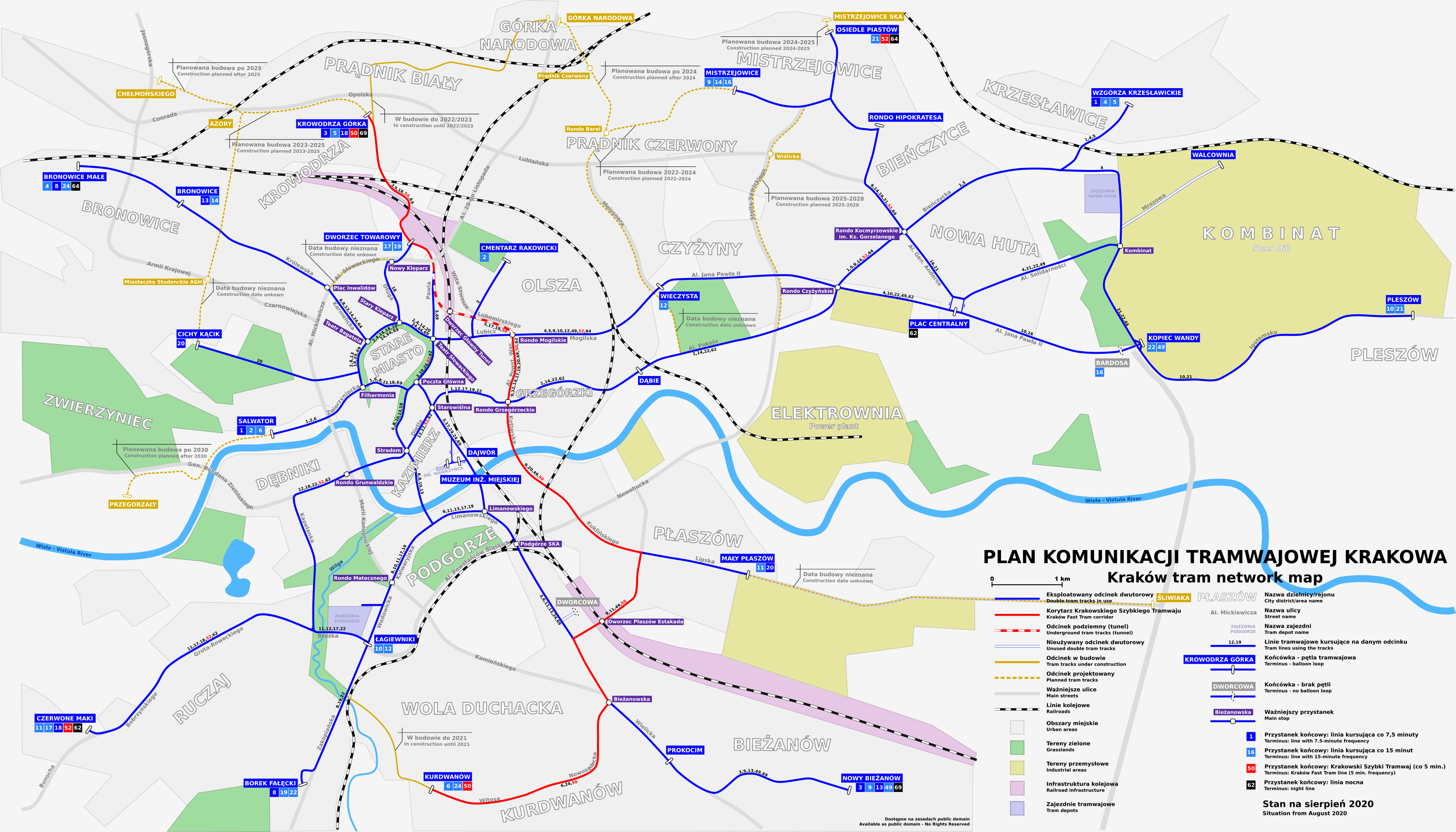
Kraków's tram network

== Bibliography ==
- Encyklopedia Krakowa. Warszawa-Kraków: Wydawnictwo Naukowe PWN. 2000.
- Demel, Juliusz (1954). Początki kolei żelaznej w Krakowie. Towarzystwo Miłosników Historii i Zabytków Krakowa.
- Station history at Magiczny Kraków, the city's official webpage
