= Reblino railway station =

Railway station in Reblino, Poland

Reblino

General information
- Location: Reblino; Poland
- Coordinates: 54.430304°N 16.917082°E
- Owner: Polskie Koleje Państwowe S.A.
- Line: 202: Stargard Szczeciński - Gdańsk Główny
- Platforms: 1

History
- Former names: Alt Reblin

Services
| Preceding station | Polregio | Following station |
|---|---|---|
| Sycewice towards Darłowo | PR | Słupsk Terminus |
| Sycewice towards Koszalin or Kołobrzeg | PR | Słupsk Terminus |
| Sycewice towards Szczecin Główny | PR | Słupsk Terminus |
Location

Reblino is a PKP railway station in Reblino (Pomeranian Voivodeship), Poland.

== Lines crossing the station ==
| Start station | End station | Line type |
|---|---|---|
| Gdańsk Główny | Stargard Szczeciński | Passenger/Freight |

== Train services ==
The station is served by the following services:

- Regional services (R) Słupsk — Koszalin
- Regional services (R) Słupsk — Koszalin — Kołobrzeg
- Regional services (R) Słupsk — Koszalin — Szczecin Główny
- Regional services(R) Słupsk — Darłowo
