= Sławno railway station =

Railway station in West Pomerania, Poland

Sławno

General information
- Location: Sławno, West Pomeranian Voivodeship; Poland
- Owner: Polskie Koleje Państwowe S.A.
- Line: 202: Stargard Szczeciński - Gdańsk Główny; 418: Korzybie - Darłowo
- Platforms: 3

History
- Former names: Schlawe
Location

Sławno is a PKP railway station in Sławno (West Pomeranian Voivodeship), Poland.

== Train services ==
The station is served by the following services:

- Intercity services (IC) Łódź Fabryczna — Warszawa — Gdańsk Glowny — Kołobrzeg
- Intercity services (IC) Szczecin - Koszalin - Słupsk - Gdynia - Gdańsk
- Intercity services (IC) Szczecin - Koszalin - Słupsk - Gdynia - Gdańsk - Elbląg/Iława - Olsztyn
- Intercity services (IC) Szczecin - Koszalin - Słupsk - Gdynia - Gdańsk - Elbląg - Olsztyn - Białystok
- Intercity services (IC) Ustka - Koszalin - Poznań - Wrocław - Opole - Bielsko-Biała
- Intercity services (IC) Ustka - Koszalin - Poznań - Wrocław - Katowice - Kraków - Rzeszów - Przemyśl
- Intercity services (IC) Słupsk - Koszalin - Poznań - Wrocław
- Intercity services (IC) Słupsk - Koszalin - Poznań - Wrocław - Opole - Katowice
- Intercity services (TLK) Kołobrzeg — Gdynia Główna — Warszawa Wschodnia — Kraków Główny
- Regional services (R) Słupsk — Koszalin
- Regional services (R) Słupsk — Koszalin — Kołobrzeg
- Regional services (R) Słupsk — Koszalin — Szczecin Główny
- Regional services(R) Słupsk — Darłowo

Preceding station	PKP Intercity	Following station
Koszalin towards Kołobrzeg	IC	Słupsk towards Łódź Fabryczna
Koszalin towards Szczecin Główny	IC	Słupsk towards Gdańsk Główny
Koszalin towards Szczecin Główny	IC	Słupsk towards Olsztyn Główny
Koszalin towards Szczecin Główny	IC	Słupsk towards Białystok
Słupsk towards Ustka	IC	Koszalin towards Bielsko-Biała Główna
Słupsk towards Ustka	IC	Koszalin towards Przemyśl Główny
Słupsk Terminus	IC	Koszalin towards Wrocław Główny or Katowice
Koszalin towards Kołobrzeg	TLK	Słupsk towards Kraków Główny
Preceding station	Polregio	Following station
Karwice towards Darłowo	PR	Wrześnica towards Słupsk
Karwice towards Koszalin or Kołobrzeg	PR	Wrześnica towards Słupsk
Karwice towards Szczecin Główny	PR	Wrześnica towards Słupsk
