= Ustronie Morskie railway station =

Railway station in West Pomerania, Poland

Ustronie Morskie
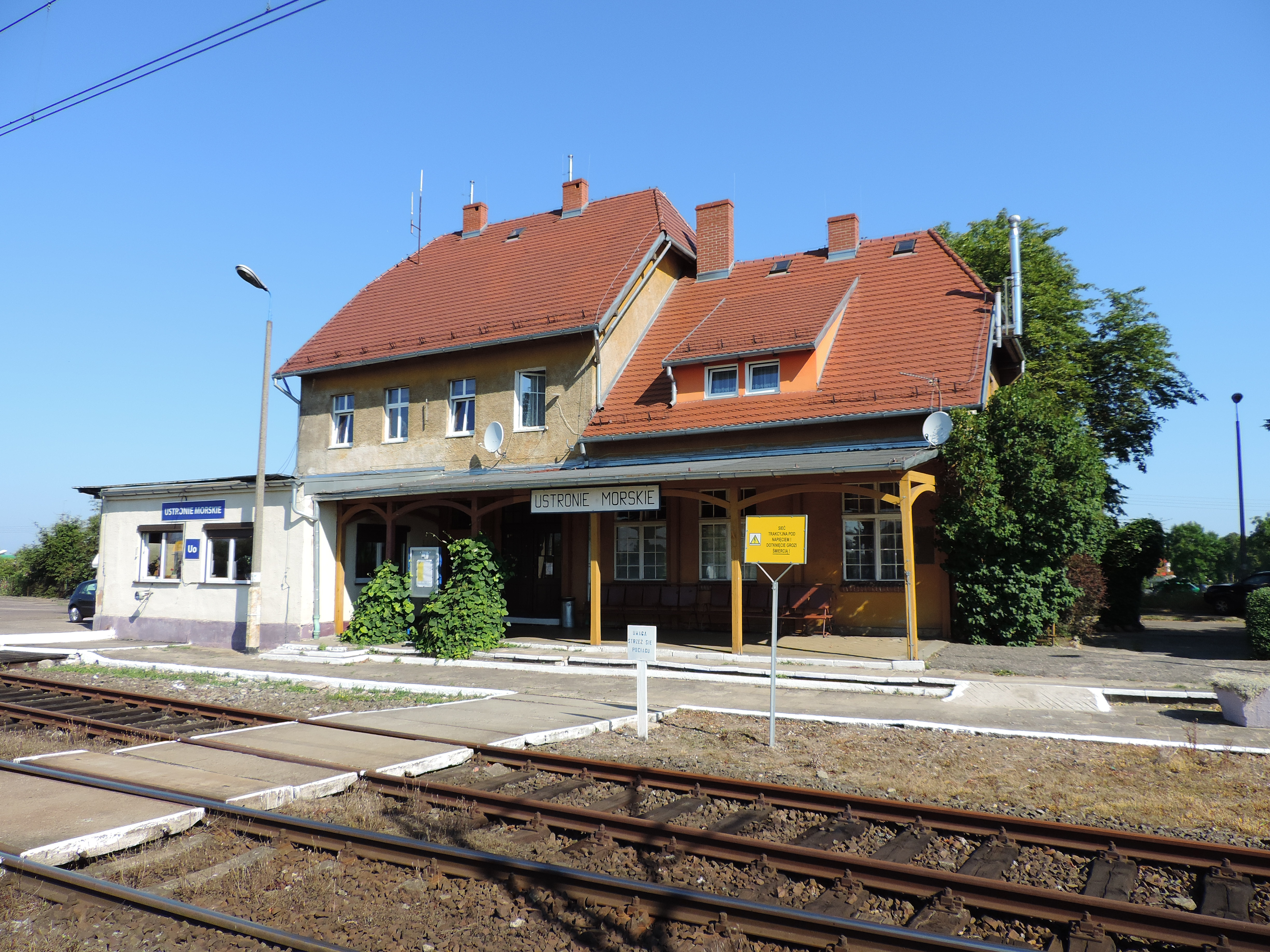
- Ustronie Morskie railway station

General information
- Location: Ustronie Morskie, West Pomeranian Voivodeship; Poland
- Coordinates: 54.2006892°N 15.7469487°E
- Owner: Polskie Koleje Państwowe S.A.
- Line: 402: Koszalin - Goleniow
- Platforms: 2

History
- Former names: Henkenhagen (bei Kolberg)

Services
Preceding station	PKP Intercity	Following station
Kołobrzeg Terminus	IC	Koszalin towards Łódź Fabryczna
Kołobrzeg Terminus	TLK	Koszalin towards Kraków Główny
Preceding station	Polregio	Following station
Kołobrzeg Terminus	PR	Tymień towards Słupsk
Kołobrzeg Terminus	PR	Tymień towards Koszalin
Kołobrzeg Terminus	PR Via Koszalin	Tymień towards Poznań Główny
Kołobrzeg towards Szczecin Główny	PR Via Kołobrzeg	Tymień towards Koszalin
Location

Ustronie Morskie is a PKP railway station in Ustronie Morskie (West Pomeranian Voivodeship), Poland.

== Train services ==
The station is served by the following services:

- Intercity services (IC) Łódź Fabryczna — Warszawa — Gdańsk Glowny — Kołobrzeg
- Intercity services (TLK) Kołobrzeg — Gdynia Główna — Warszawa Wschodnia — Kraków Główny
- Regional services (R) Słupsk — Koszalin — Kołobrzeg
- Regional services (R) Kołobrzeg — Koszalin
- Regional services (R) Kołobrzeg — Koszalin — Białogard — Szczecinek — Piła Główna — Poznań Główny
- Regional services (R) Koszalin — Kołobrzeg — Goleniów — Szczecin Główny
