= Dworzec Główny Tunel tram stop =

Tram stop in Kraków, Poland

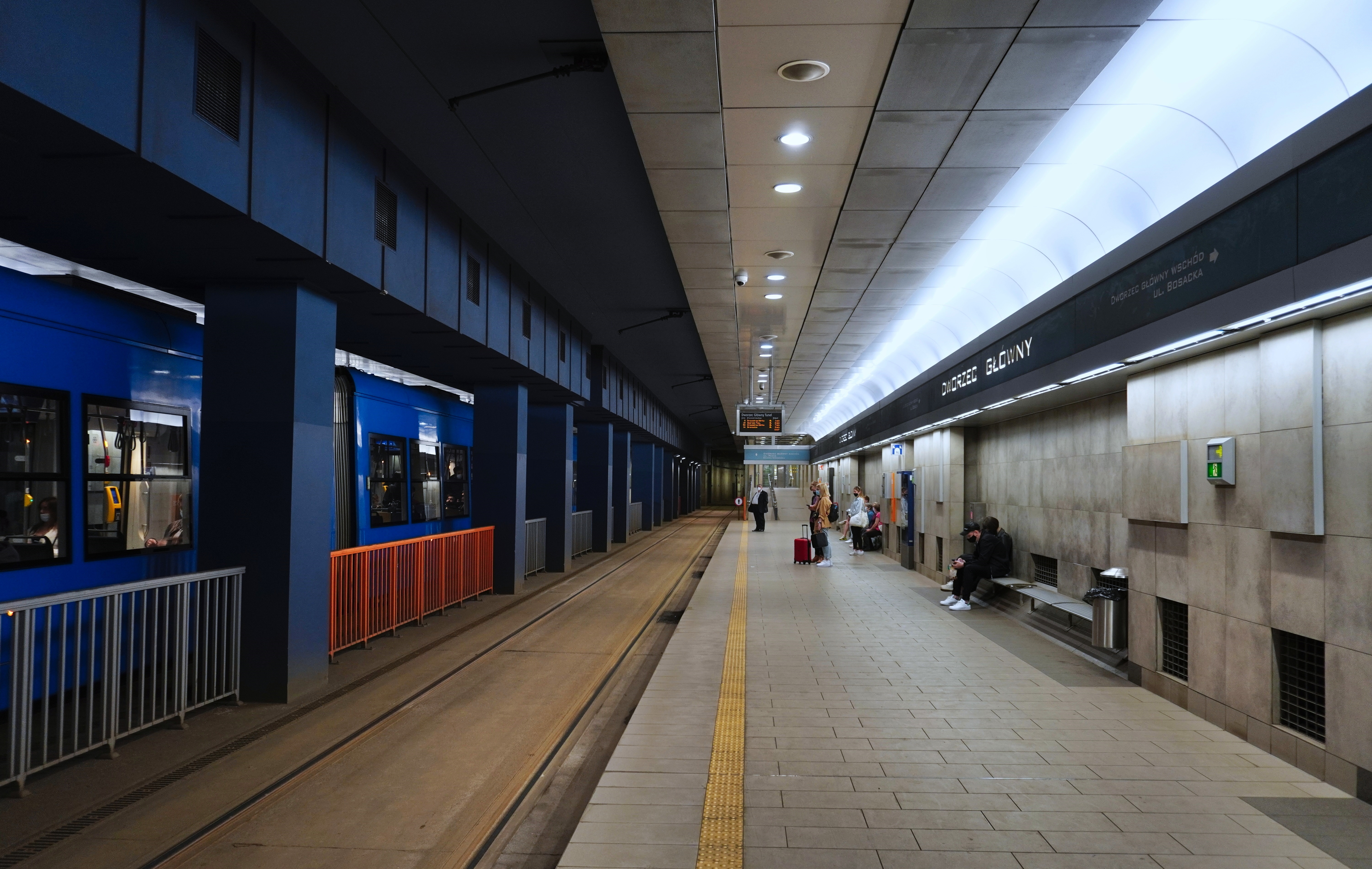
- View of the platform toward Dworzec Towarowy and Krowodrza Górka

General information
- Location: Kraków, Poland
- Coordinates: 50°04′03″N 19°56′46″E
- System: tram stop
- Platforms: 2

Construction
- Structure type: Underground
- Depth: 12 m (39 ft)

History
- Opened: 11 December 2008
Location
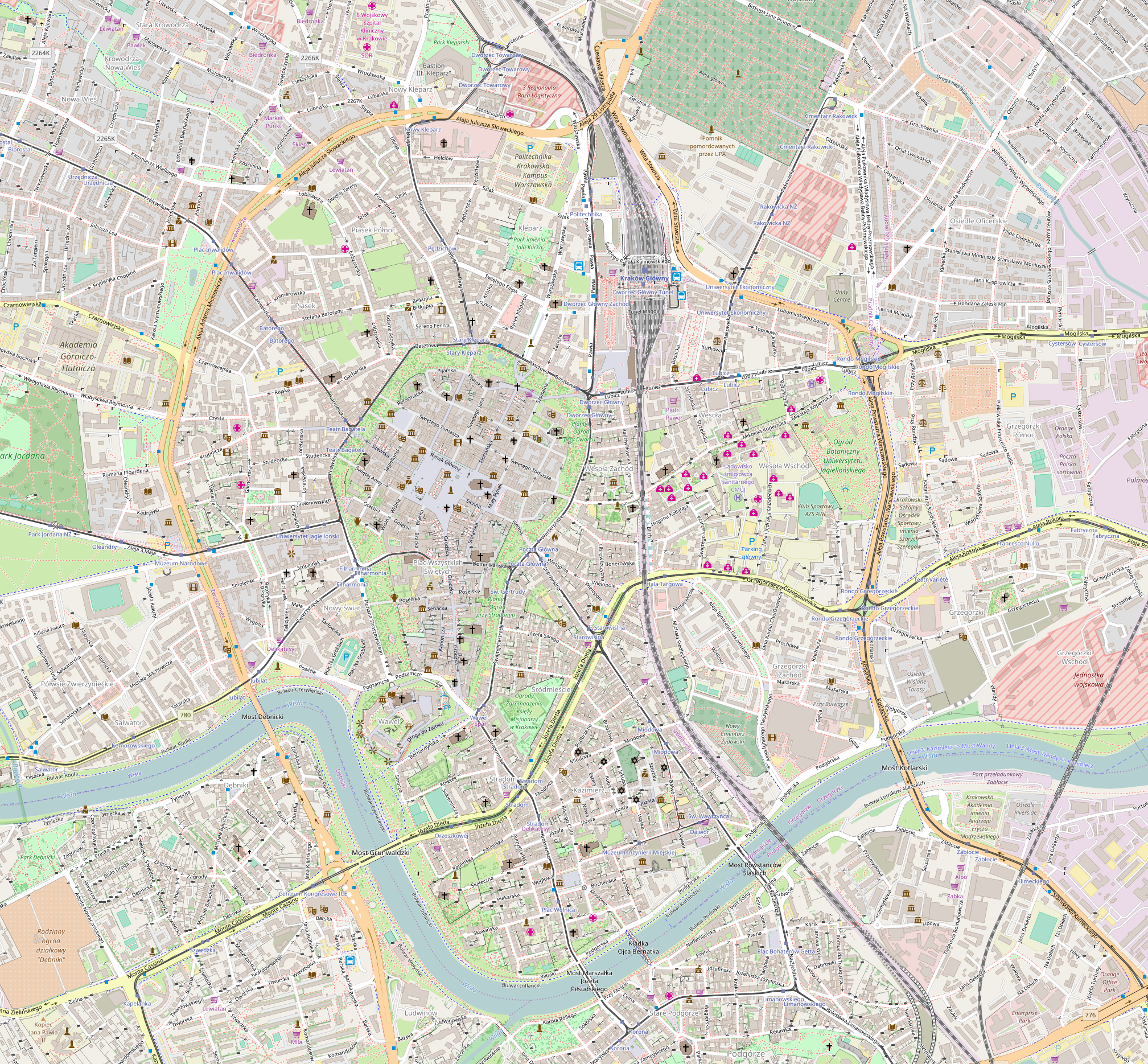
- Location within Central Kraków

The Dworzec Główny Tunel tram stop (commonly referred to as "Dworzec Główny") is one of the two underground tram stops in Kraków, located in Dzielnica I Stare Miasto district. It is situated along the route of the Kraków Fast Tram tunnel, beneath Galeria Krakowska and the Kraków Główny railway station. The stop features two platforms: one serving trams heading towards Krowodrza Górka and Dworzec Towarowy, and the other for trams traveling towards Mogilskie Roundabout.

== History ==
=== Construction ===
In the 1970s, the Kraków City Council planned the construction of a metro line connecting Nowa Huta with the city center. This project began in 1974 with the construction of a 180-meter-long tunnel section under the modernized Kraków railway hub. Originally, the tunnel was to run east-west, extending from Mogilskie Roundabout to Karmelicka Street. Plans also included building the Kraków Communication Center at the current site of the Polish State Railways station. The architects intended to complete construction swiftly.

In 1986, the tram line running from Mogilskie Roundabout along Aleksander Lubomirski Street to the Dworzec Wschodni terminus was closed, with plans to reroute it through the tunnel. However, economic crises and political changes halted this and other transport investments in Kraków. By 1990, the section under the station platforms was completed, but the project shifted focus from east-west to north-south alignment, abandoning the metro concept in favor of a fast tram system. Work resumed in 1995, and in 1999, a 605-meter tunnel section under Aleksander Lubomirski Street was completed, though the exit remained unfinished.

The project resumed again in 2004, following a successful tender won by the Turkish company Güriş. Simultaneously, additional developments were undertaken around Dworzec Główny, including the construction of the MDA Bus Station and Galeria Krakowska, under which another tunnel section was planned.

In spring 2005, Güriş withdrew amidst controversy, leaving an unfinished tunnel. The city secured the existing structure, and work was delayed for over six months. The Budimex-Dromex consortium completed the construction. By September 2006, the tram stop was structurally complete. At the end of 2007, the first track was laid on the side of Dworzec Towarowy at the Dworzec Główny Tunel stop, with a second track completed a few months later. In July 2008, the overhead power lines were installed, and by September, test runs through the tunnel began. Although the construction log was completed on time, finishing works continued. Additionally, due to the lack of legal regulations regarding tram tunnel safety in Polish law, final work took longer. The opening was delayed further due to malfunctioning systems during fire safety tests. Ultimately, the Dworzec Główny Tunel tram stop and the Kraków Fast Tram Tunnel were officially opened on 11 December 2008, after 34 years of construction.

=== Inauguration ===
On opening day, a Bombardier NGT6 tram operated on a special free Line 90 service, running through the tunnel from Wieczysta terminus to Dworzec Towarowy shortly after 5:00 PM. The following day, the stop began regular operation as part of the Kraków Fast Tram network.

== Infrastructure ==
The underground tram stop Dworzec Główny Tunel, along with the Politechnika stop, ranks among the deepest tram stops in Poland, with its platform located approximately 12 meters below ground level. The platform edges measure about 100 meters in length, making them the longest in all of Kraków.

The Dworzec Główny Tunel stop is fully accessible, equipped with ramps, elevators, and escalators to accommodate people with disabilities, cyclists, and passengers with strollers. Some of the escalators at the entrance to the stop are among the longest in the country.

The stop was constructed on a thick reinforced concrete slab. Its structure, like the underground section of the Kraków Communication Center, was built using an open-cut method in a large excavation. Water table was lowered with a network of deep wells. The total width of the stop, including platforms and tracks, is approximately 15 meters.

As of 2018, the stop served up to 49,000 passengers daily.

In April 2020, renovations were carried out, including maintenance work on the stop's lighting and the tram tracks running alongside the platforms.

== Location ==
=== Placement ===
The tram stop Dworzec Główny Tunel is situated in Kraków's Dzielnica I Stare Miasto. It lies beneath Pawia Street, under the buildings of Galeria Krakowska and the Kraków Główny railway station.

The stop is accessible via four entrances, featuring two pairs of escalators, two pairs of elevators, and two ramps. One pair of entrances is located on the eastern side, near the MDA bus terminal and Wit Stwosz Street, while the other pair is on the western side of the platforms, providing direct access from Galeria Krakowska and Kraków Główny railway station.

The stop is positioned between Mogilskie Roundabout, near Dworzec Towarowy, and Politechnika, as part of a 325-meter-long tunnel segment.

=== Transportation links ===
Nearby, the Dworzec Główny transportation complex offers various connections. On the western side of the station, along Pawia Street, are three bus stops and two tram stops under the name Dworzec Główny Zachód. These serve routes heading northwest towards Nowy Kleparz and Politechnika. An additional tram stop provides connections southward toward Juliusz Słowacki Theatre and Planty Park.

To the east, near Wit Stwosz Street, the Dworzec Główny Wschód bus terminal is located, along with a private coach station on Bosacka Street.
