= Stare Miasto, Kraków (district) =

Dzielnica I Stare Miasto
- Kraków District
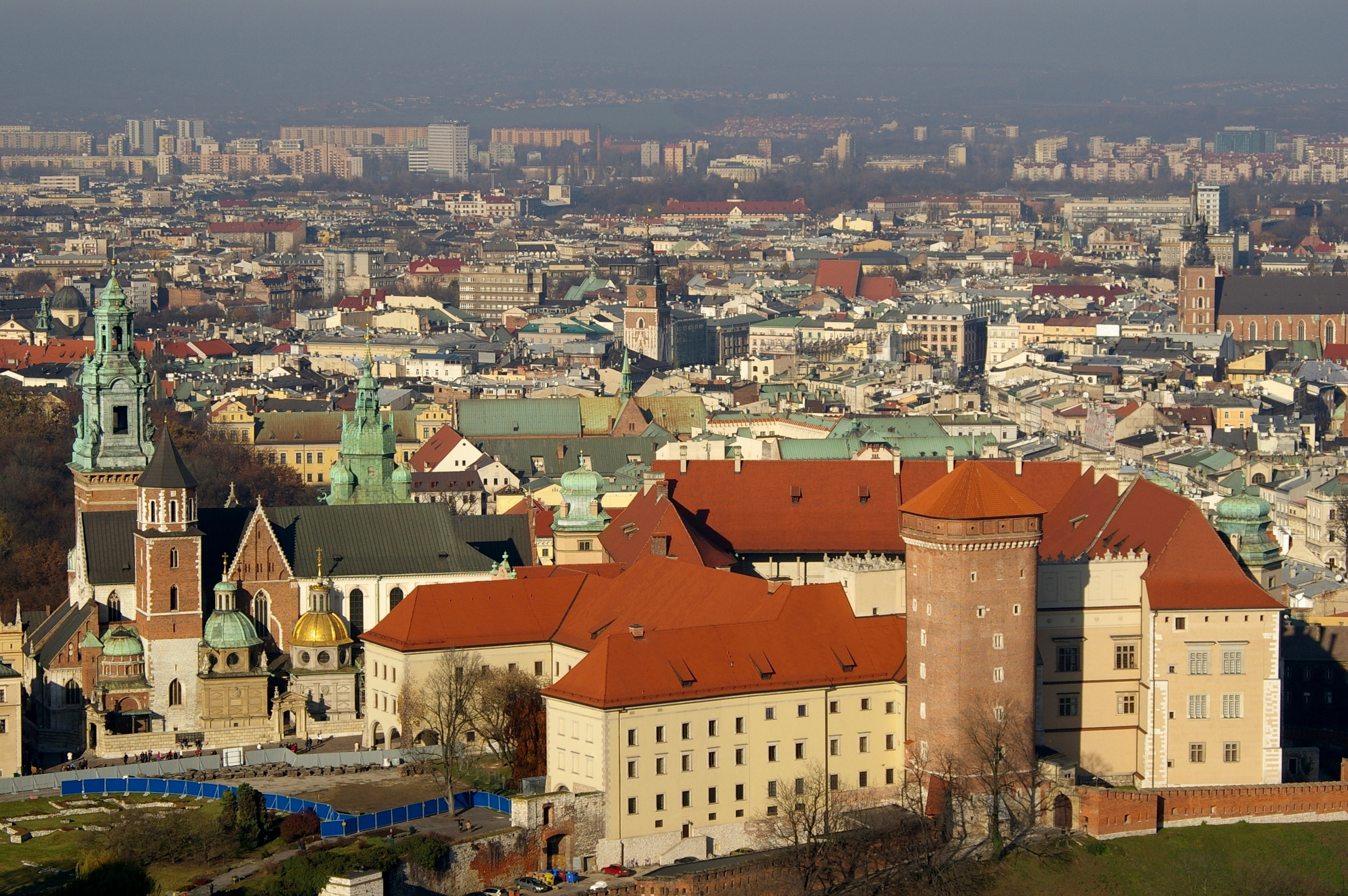
- View of Wawel and Stare Miasto

- District I Stare Miasto on the map of Kraków after the latest subdivisions
- Coordinates: 50°03′59.7″N 19°56′24.5″E
- Country: Poland
- Voivodeship: Lesser Poland
- County/City: Kraków

Area
  - Total: 1.496 km^{2} (0.578 sq mi)

Population (31 December 2019)
  - Total: 30,609
  - Density: 20,460/km^{2} (52,990/sq mi)
- Time zone: UTC+1 (CET)
  - Summer (DST): UTC+2 (CEST)
- Postal code: 31-151
- Area code: +48 12
- Website: http://www.dzielnica1.krakow.pl/

District I Old Town (Polish: Dzielnica I Stare Miasto) is a district of the city of Kraków, Poland. The district covers a wider area than the Old Town of Kraków itself.

Four out of nine subdivisions form UNESCO's World Heritage Site Historic Centre of Kraków. Six subdivisions are part of the Historic Monument (pomnik historii) "Historical ensemble of the city of Kraków".

== Location ==
The district is located in the centre part of Kraków, on the river Vistula to its south-west and south. To its north-west, the district borders the Prądnik Biały district (IV), to its north the district Prądnik Czerwony (III) and to its east the district Grzegórzki (II). Across the river it borders the district Podgórze (XIII) to its south and the district Dębniki (VIII) to its south-west. The district is bordered by Zwierzyniec (VII) and Krowodrza (V) to its west.

== History ==
Kraków was the royal capital of Poland, until Sigismund III Vasa relocated the court to Warsaw in 1596. Kazimierz got town privileges in 1335, Kleparz in 1366. They were integrated in the town of Kraków between 1792 and 1795.

The current division with eighteen districts was introduced on 27 March 1991 and revised by Kraków City Council on 19 April 1995.

The Historic Centre of Kraków was entered on the UNESCO list of World Heritage Sites in 1978. The Historic Monument "Historical ensemble of the city of Kraków" was declared by President Lech Wałęsa in 1994.

== District subdivisions ==
Map of District I Old Town and historic districts

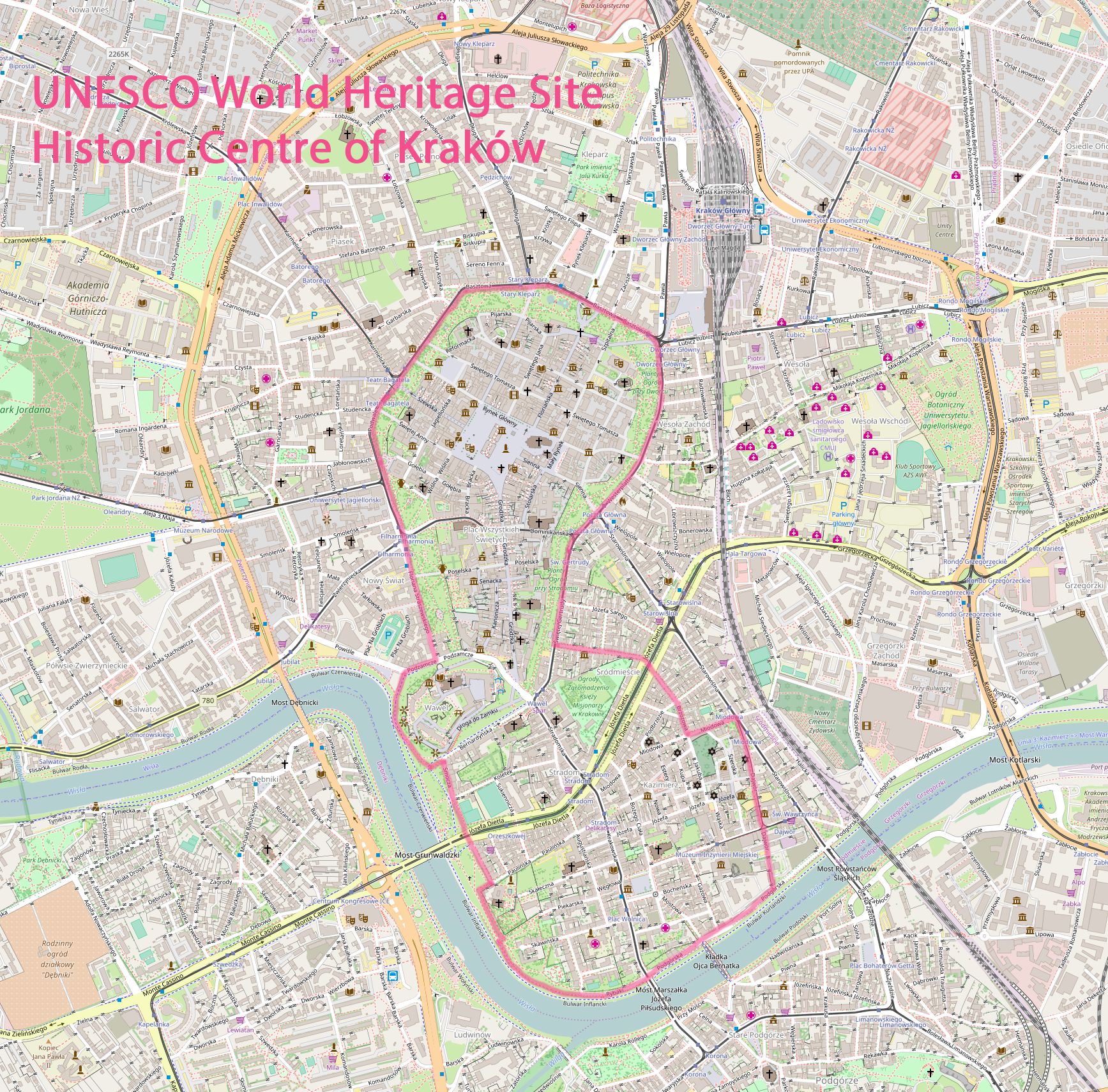
District I Old Town and Historic Centre of Kraków

The Roman numerals are indicating historical districts of Kraków which had been active between 1876 and 1954.

- Śródmieście I. ("Downtown")
- Wawel II.
- Nowy Świat III. ("New World")
- Piasek IV.
- Kleparz V.
- Wesoła VI. (western part)
- Stradom VII.
- Kazimierz VIII.
- Krowodrza XVII. (eastern part)
- Warszawskie XVIII. (southern part)

== UNESCO World Heritage Site and Historic Monument ==
Four subdivisions with 1.496 square kilometres (0.578 sq mi) are part of the World Heritage Site Historic Centre of Kraków.

- Stare Miasto ("Old Town" with Okół)
- Wawel Hill
- Stradom
- Kazimierz

The other subdivisions mentioned above are part of the buffer zone with exception of the modern part of Nowe Miasto.

The World Heritage Site and the subdivisions of Nowy Świat and Piasek are part of the Historic Monument (pomnik historii) "Historical ensemble of the city of Kraków" (Historyczny zespół miasta). A part of Wesoła and the historic centre of Podgórze across the Vistula are completing the site. Historic monuments are objects of the highest level of objects of cultural heritage in Poland.

== See also ==
- Dworzec Główny Tunel
