= Koszalin railway station =

Main railway station in Koszalin, Poland

Koszalin
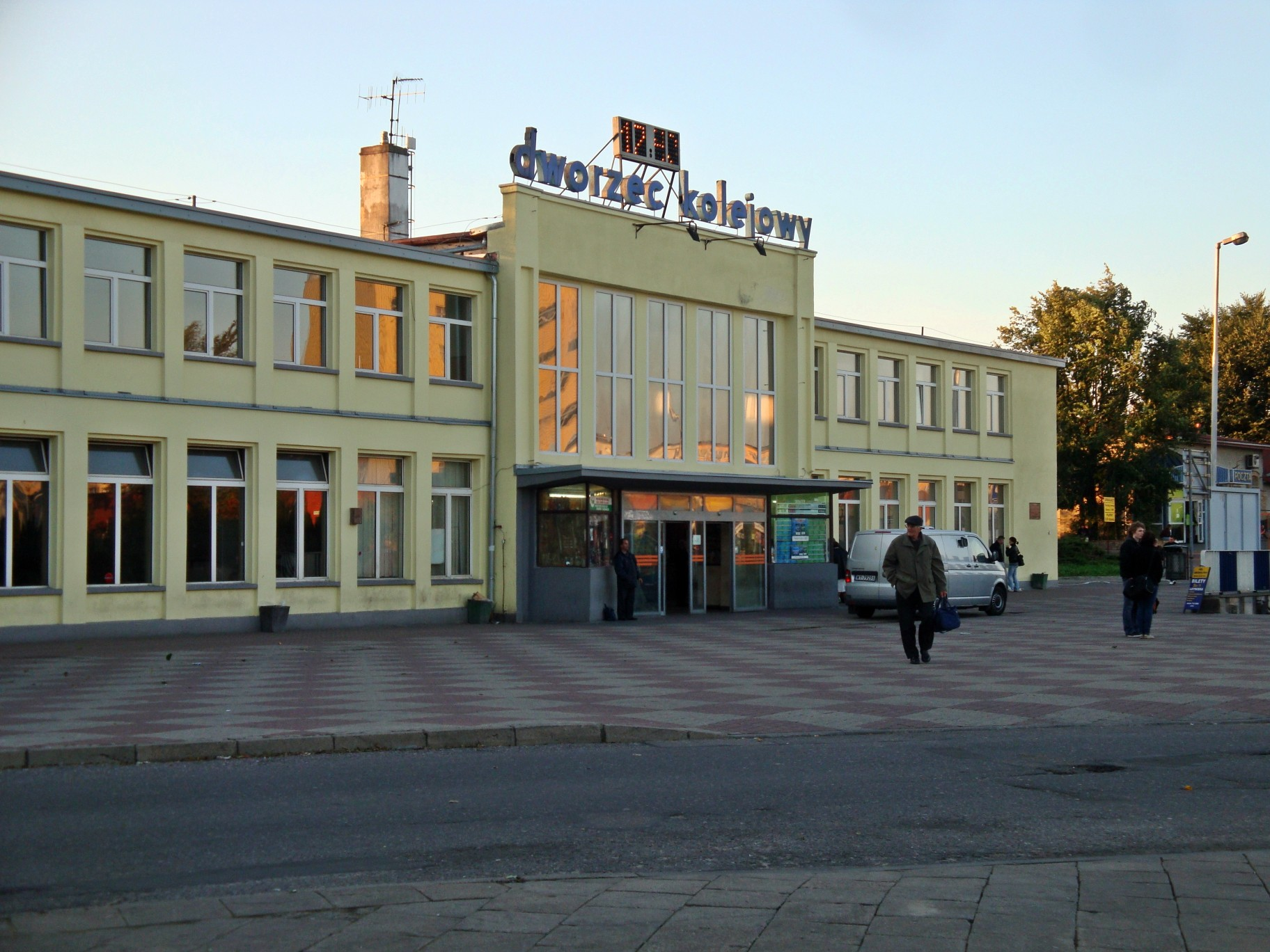
- Main entry to the railway station in Koszalin (1962-2023). Now in renovation.

General information
- Location: Aleja Armii Krajowej 3; 75-200 Koszalin; Poland
- Coordinates: 54°11′23″N 16°10′11″E
- System: Railway Station
- Owner: PKP S.A. (main building); PKP Polskie Linie Kolejowe S.A. (platforms and tunnels)
- Lines: 202: Gdańsk–Stargard railway 402: Koszalin – Goleniów railway
- Platforms: 2
- Tracks: 4
- Train operators: PKP Intercity; Polregio
- Connections: PKP Intercity: EIP, EIC, IC, TLK; Polregio: REG; Buses: 2, 3, 4, 6, 10, 11, 12, 14, 15, 16, 17, 19

Construction
- Structure type: Building: Yes
- Parking: Yes, paid
- Accessible: Elevators: yes

History
- Opened: 1859; 167 years ago
- Rebuilt: 1962, in progress (2023)
- Former names: Köslin (1859-1945)

Passengers
- 2021: 1,06 mln
Location
- Location within Koszalin

Koszalin is a railway station in the city of Koszalin, Poland. As of 2012, it is served by Polregio (local services) and PKP Intercity (Express Premium, Express, Intercity and TLK services).

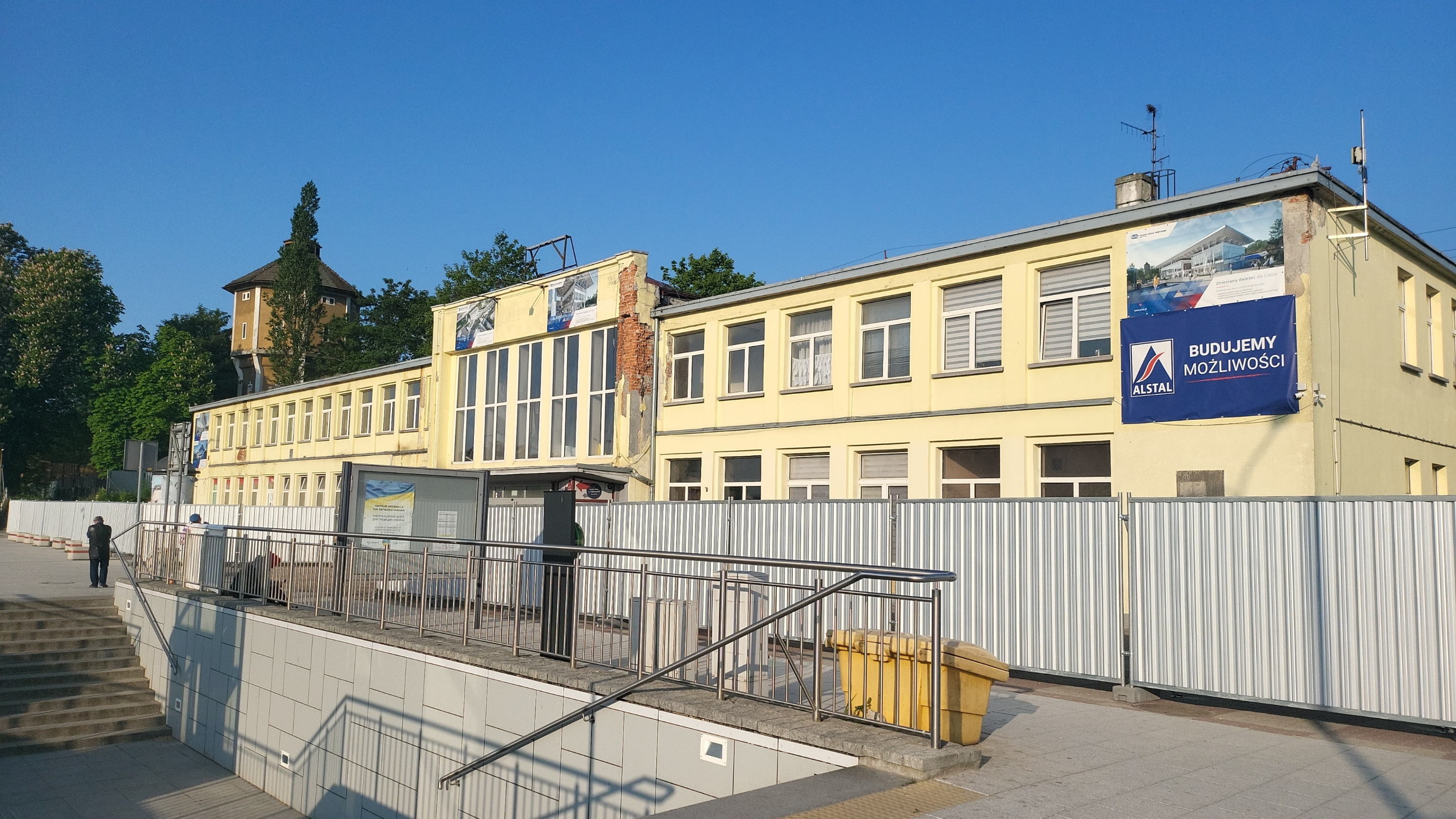
Station building during its 2023 demolition

In 2023, the railway station in Koszalin will undergo another reconstruction, which will last about a year. Current station building will be demolished, and only a few elements from it, currently under conservation protection (including sgraffito from the main hall), will be used in the construction of the new one. The new station will have a modern shape and will be covered with a semi-transparent glass roof. On the ground floor there is space for commercial premises and a capacious waiting room. The new building of the Koszalin station will be put into use at the end of 2024.

== Train services ==
Access to Koszalin is possible from many major cities in Poland. There is direct access from Gdańsk, Warsaw, Kraków, Wrocław, Katowice, Szczecin, Łódź, Kielce, Opole, Radom and many more cities. Koszalin has a direct connection with the Szczecin-Goleniów airport thanks to the use of modern hybrid trains. PKP Intercity runs many year-round connections and additional connections in the summer season, which make it easier for travelers to get to Koszalin and Baltic Sea. In the summer season, the city of Koszalin, in cooperation with Polregio, runs daily trains on the route Koszalin - Mielno Koszalińskie - Koszalin.

Preceding station	PKP Intercity	Following station
Kołobrzeg Terminus	EIP	Słupsk towards Kraków Główny
Ustronie Morskie towards Kołobrzeg	IC	Sławno towards Łódź Fabryczna
Białogard towards Szczecin Główny	IC	Sławno towards Gdańsk Główny
Białogard towards Szczecin Główny	IC	Sławno towards Olsztyn Główny
Białogard towards Szczecin Główny	IC	Sławno towards Białystok
Sławno towards Ustka	IC	Białogard towards Bielsko-Biała Główna
Sławno towards Ustka	IC	Białogard towards Przemyśl Główny
Sławno towards Słupsk	IC	Białogard towards Wrocław Główny or Katowice
Ustronie Morskie towards Kołobrzeg	TLK	Sławno towards Kraków Główny
Preceding station	Polregio	Following station
Terminus	PR	Dunowo towards Białogard or Poznań Główny
Mścice towards Kołobrzeg	PR	Terminus
Mścice towards Kołobrzeg	PR Via Koszalin	Dunowo towards Poznań Główny
Terminus	PR	Skibno towards Słupsk
Mścice towards Kołobrzeg	PR	Skibno towards Słupsk
Mścice towards Szczecin Główny	PR Via Kołobrzeg	Terminus
Dunowo towards Szczecin Główny	PR Via Białogard	Terminus
Dunowo towards Szczecin Główny	PR	Skibno towards Słupsk

== Public transport ==
Access to the station is possible by public transport (buses): lines 3, 4, 6, 10, 12, 14, 15, 16, 17, 19 ("Dworzec PKP" bus stop), lines 2, 6, 11 ("Dworzec PKS" bus stop), by buses and coaches of private carriers, e.g. Ronin, DPP, FlixBus, PKS Koszalin ("Centrum Przesiadkowe" bus stop and Bus Station).

== Gallery ==
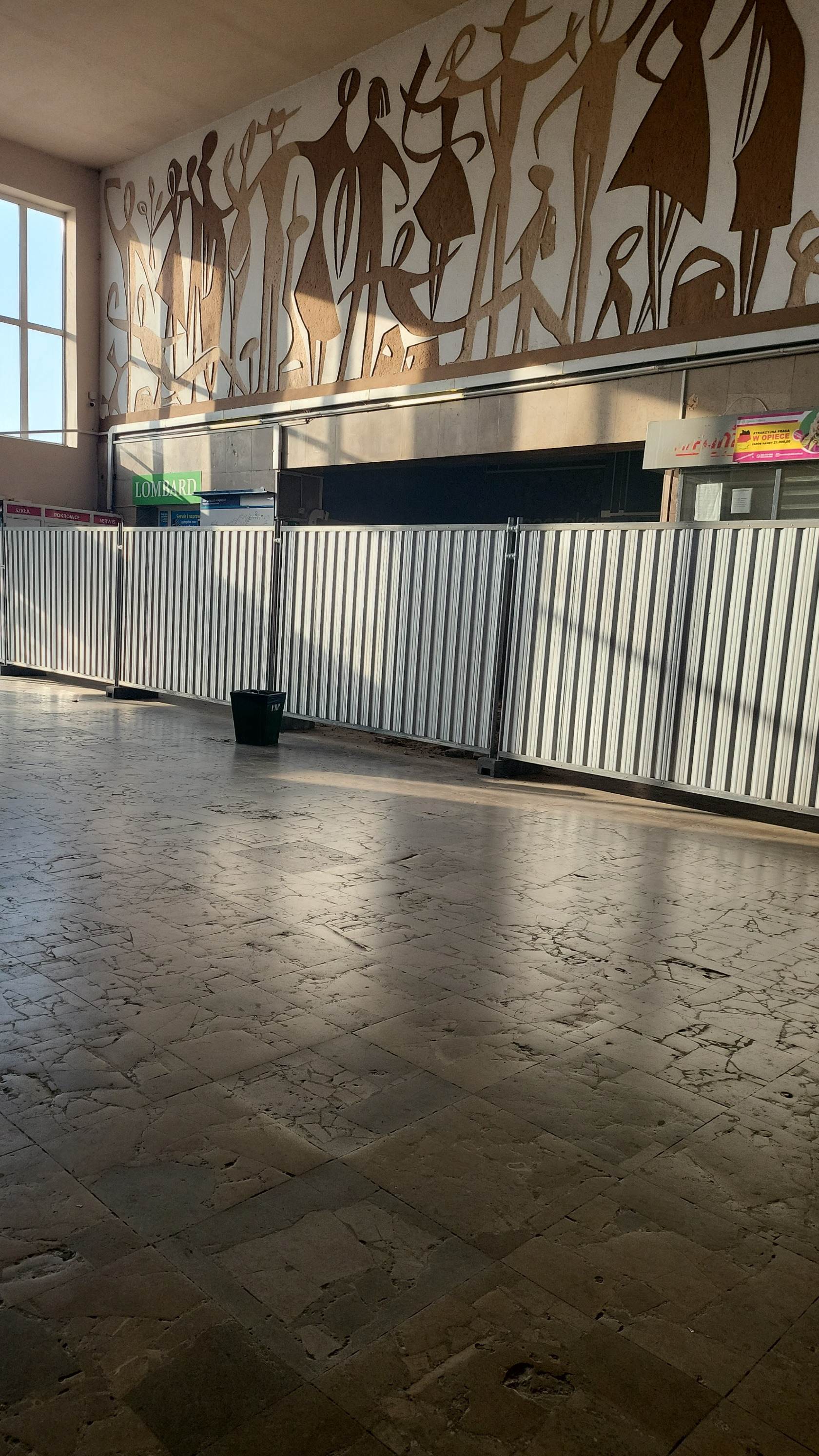
The interior of the main hall of the station during demolition (2023), in the background the passage to the waiting room and sgraffito, which will be preserved and moved to the new station building.

Scheme of EIP, EIC, IC, TLK, REGIO train routes from Koszalin station.
