= Słupsk railway station =

Railway station in Słupsk, Poland

Słupsk
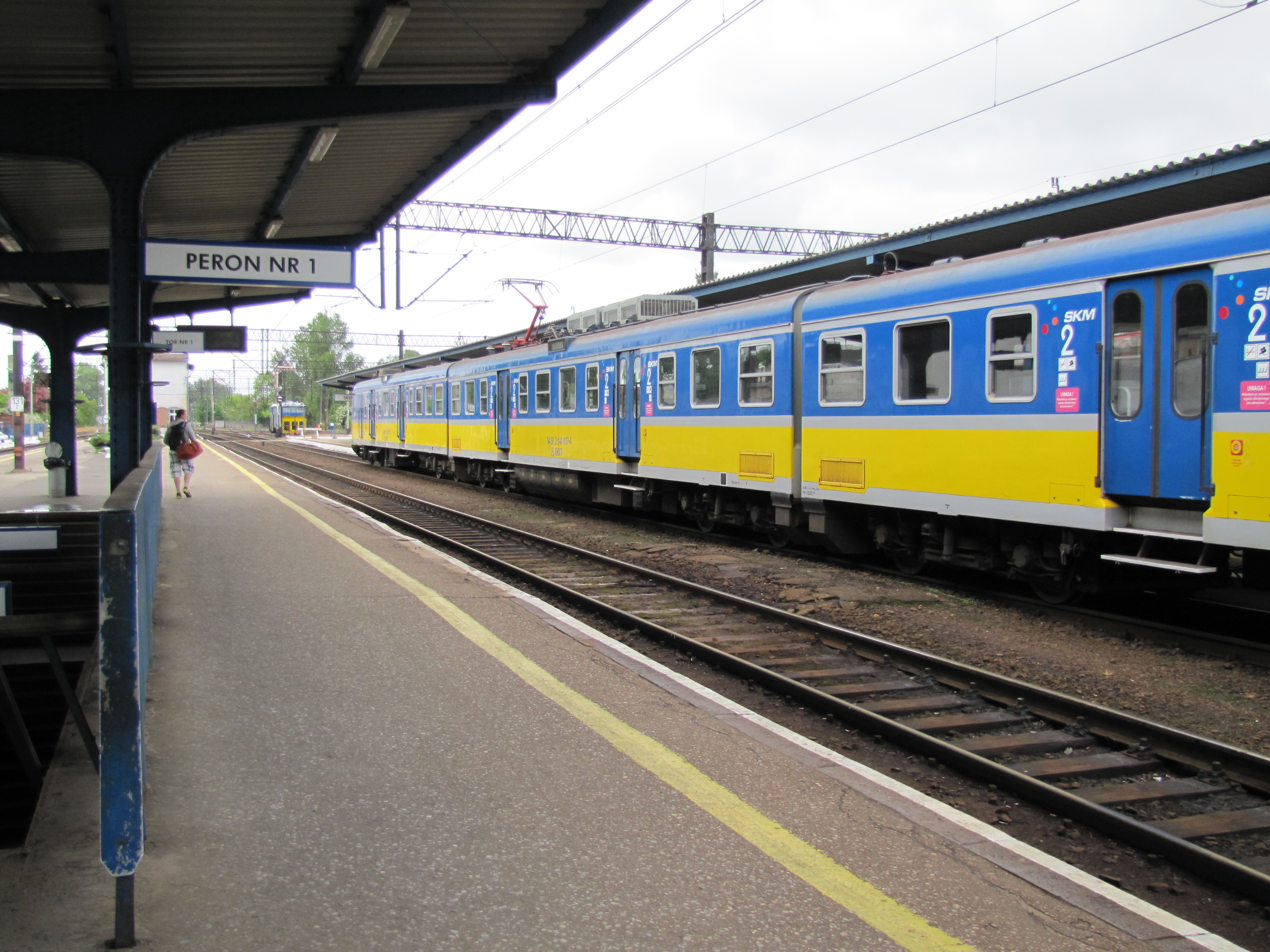
- Słupsk railway station in 2013

General information
- Location: Kołłątaja street, Słupsk; Poland
- Coordinates: 54°28′2″N 17°1′2″E
- Owner: Polskie Koleje Państwowe S.A.
- Line: 202: Stargard - Gdańsk Główny; 405: Piła Główna - Ustka Uroczysko
- Platforms: 3

Construction
- Structure type: Building: Station building Depot: Yes (not in use); Water tower: Yes (not in use)

History
- Opened: 1 July 1869; 157 years ago
- Electrified: 1988
- Former names: Stolp
Location

Słupsk railway station is a PKP and a PR railway station in Słupsk (Pomeranian Voivodeship), Poland. It is a junction station, the railway line No. 202 from Gdańsk Główny to Stargard intersects here with the railway line No. 405, connecting the station with Ustka.

According to the classification in terms of number of train passengers; Słupsk is a category B station.

== Station building ==
The station building was built in 1990–91 and was opened on 10 January 1991. There are eight ticket offices in the building, available all day.

== History ==
The first railway line reached Słupsk in 1869 from Gdańsk. Soon after, workshops were opened in the city. In 1945 the Soviet army destroyed the central part of the station building as a result of artillery fire. On 27 May 1945 the railway connection with Lębork was opened. In subsequent weeks Słupsk gained connections with Ustka, Koszalin, Kołobrzeg, Białogard and Szczecinek. In 1988 and 1989, electrified traction reached the city.

The station served as the westernmost terminus of the SKM Tricity commuter rail line between 2007 and 9 December 2017, when it was cut back to Lębork.

== Lines crossing the station ==
Start station	End station	Line type
Piła Główna	Ustka	Passenger/Freight
Słupsk	Cecenowo	Dismantled
Słupsk	Budowo	Dismantled
Gdańsk Główny	Stargard	Passenger/Freight

== Rail links ==
- Białogard (REGIO, TLK)
- Białystok (TLK)
- Gdańsk Główny (PR, TLK)
- Gdynia Główna (PR, TLK)
- Katowice (TLK)
- Kołobrzeg (TLK)
- Koszalin (REGIO, TLK)
- Kraków Główny (TLK)
- Miastko (REGIO)
- Olsztyn Główny (TLK)
- Poznań Główny (TLK)
- Rumia (PR)
- Szczecin Główny (REGIO, TLK)
- Ustka (REGIO)
- Wejherowo (PR, TLK)

== Train services ==
The station is served by the following services:

- Express Intercity Premium services (EIP) Kołobrzeg - Gdynia - Warsaw - Kraków
- Intercity services (IC) Łódź Fabryczna — Warszawa — Gdańsk Glowny — Kołobrzeg
- Intercity services (IC) Szczecin - Koszalin - Słupsk - Gdynia - Gdańsk
- Intercity services (IC) Szczecin - Koszalin - Słupsk - Gdynia - Gdańsk - Elbląg/Iława - Olsztyn
- Intercity services (IC) Szczecin - Koszalin - Słupsk - Gdynia - Gdańsk - Elbląg - Olsztyn - Białystok
- Intercity services (IC) Ustka - Koszalin - Poznań - Wrocław - Opole - Bielsko-Biała
- Intercity services (IC) Ustka - Koszalin - Poznań - Wrocław - Katowice - Kraków - Rzeszów - Przemyśl
- Intercity services (IC) Słupsk - Koszalin - Poznań - Wrocław
- Intercity services (IC) Słupsk - Koszalin - Poznań - Wrocław - Opole - Katowice
- Intercity services (TLK) Kołobrzeg — Gdynia Główna — Warszawa Wschodnia — Kraków Główny
- Direction of Gdynia
  - Regional services (R) Tczew — Słupsk
  - Regional services (R) Malbork — Słupsk
  - Regional services (R) Elbląg — Słupsk
  - Regional services (R) Słupsk — Bydgoszcz Główna
  - Regional services (R) Słupsk — Gdynia Główna
- Direction of Szczecin
  - Regional services (R) Słupsk — Koszalin
  - Regional services (R) Słupsk — Koszalin — Kołobrzeg
  - Regional services (R) Słupsk — Koszalin — Szczecin Główny
  - Regional services(R) Słupsk — Darłowo
- Direction of Ustka
  - Regional services (R) Słupsk — Ustka Uroczysko
- Direction of Szczecinek
  - Regional services (R) Słupsk — Miastko
  - Regional services (R) Słupsk — Miastko — Szczecinek
  - Regional services (R) Słupsk — Miastko — Szczecinek — Chojnice

Preceding station	PKP Intercity	Following station
Koszalin towards Kołobrzeg	EIP	Lębork towards Kraków Główny
Sławno towards Kołobrzeg	IC	Lębork towards Łódź Fabryczna
Sławno towards Szczecin Główny	IC	Lębork towards Gdańsk Główny
Sławno towards Szczecin Główny	IC	Lębork towards Olsztyn Główny
Sławno towards Szczecin Główny	IC	Lębork towards Białystok
Ustka Terminus	IC	Sławno towards Bielsko-Biała Główna
Ustka Terminus	IC	Sławno towards Przemyśl Główny
Terminus	IC	Sławno towards Wrocław Główny or Katowice
Sławno towards Kołobrzeg	TLK	Lębork towards Kraków Główny
Preceding station	Polregio	Following station
Terminus	PR	Jezierzyce Słupskie towards Tczew
Terminus	PR	Jezierzyce Słupskie towards Malbork
Terminus	PR	Jezierzyce Słupskie towards Elbląg
Terminus	PR	Jezierzyce Słupskie towards Smętowo, Laskowice Pomorskie, or Bydgoszcz Główna
Terminus	PR	Jezierzyce Słupskie towards Gdynia Główna
Terminus	PR	Słupsk Północny towards Ustka Uroczysko
Reblino towards Darłowo	PR	Terminus
Reblino towards Koszalin or Szczecin Główny	PR	Terminus
Reblino towards Szczecin Główny	PR	Terminus
Kobylnica Słupska towards Miastko, Szczecinek or Chojnice	PR	Terminus
