= Sycewice =

- Village
- Location within Poland
- Coordinates: 54°25′17″N 16°51′39″E
- Country: Poland
- Voivodeship: Pomeranian
- County: Słupsk
- Gmina: Kobylnica
- Population: 1,089

Sycewice [sɨt͡sɛˈvit͡sɛ] (German: Zitzewitz) is a village in the administrative district of Gmina Kobylnica, within Słupsk County, Pomeranian Voivodeship, in northern Poland.

== Transport ==
The expressway S6 bypasses the village to the north and west. Exit 34 of the S6 expressway at Sycewice allows for quick access to Słupsk (13km to the east) and Gdańsk (145km to the east). Upon the opening of expressway S6 in December 2025, national road 6 (which formerly ran through Sycewice) was re-numbered to minor road 112. Sycewice railway station lies 2.2 km to the south-west of the village. It lies on the main railway line between Gdańsk and Szczecin. Regional trains provide connections to Koszalin, Sławno and Słupsk. Some local buses travel between Sycewice and Słupsk.
