= Kraków Fast Tram =

Light rail system in Kraków, Poland

Kraków Fast Tram Krakowski Szybki Tramwaj (KST)
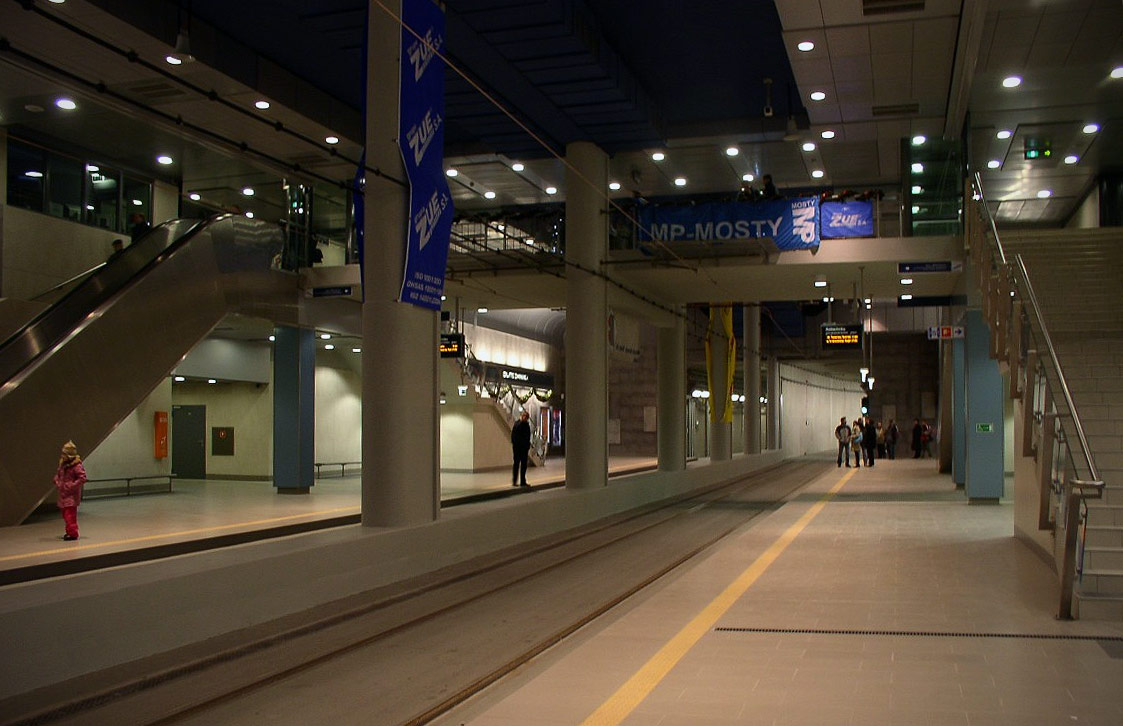
- Politechnika station

Operation
- Locale: Kraków, Poland
- Open: 2008
- Lines: 2
- Operator: MPK Kraków

Infrastructure
- Track gauge: 1,435 mm (4 ft 8 1/2 in)
- Propulsion system: Electricity

Kraków Fast Tram (Polish: Krakowski Szybki Tramwaj) is a light rail network being developed in Kraków alongside the existing tramway.

It consists of several modernized or purpose-built tram tracks with radio-controlled absolute priority on crossings, a 1.4 kilometres (4,600 ft) long tunnel under Kraków Główny railway station with two underground stops and a 0.6 kilometres (0.37 mi) long overpass over Kraków Płaszów rail station. Unlike many light rail systems, Kraków Fast Tram is not separate from regular tramway lines: the tracks are a part of the wider "classic" tramway network and are used by ordinary trams, which benefit from moving through a fast tram corridor. The stops at the fast tram tracks are equipped with an electronic passenger information system showing estimated departure times live. As of 2017, the system is also installed on other, less modern tram lines.

== History ==
The first fast tram line was opened on 12 December 2008, more than 30 years since construction started; however due to the missing tracks through Płaszów, it temporarily used the link through Kazimierz and Podgórze districts, where short lengths of track were not in its own right-of-way but were connected to the traffic light control system and passenger information system. That gap was eliminated when the light rail overpass over the rail station in Płaszów opened on 30 August 2015. The construction costs amounted to 164 million złoty, of which 67 million was covered by EU funds. It incorporates a tram stop with stairways and elevators to the rail platforms underneath and can be used by both pedestrians and cyclists, in addition to trams and emergency vehicles.

== Lines ==
In addition to the ordinary lines, there are two "fast tram lines" that run at up to 5 minute intervals on the fast tram tracks:

Line	Start	End	Travel duration	Stops	Frequency (minutes)	Hours of service
	Górka Narodowa P+R	Borek Fałęcki (Kurdwanów P+R)	55 min (44 min)	36 (29)	5 to 30	4:44 - 0:06 next day
	Czerwone Maki P+R	Osiedle Piastów	53 min	35	7 to 30	4:35 - 23:58

== See also ==
- Trams in Kraków
- Dworzec Główny Tunel
