= Galeria Krakowska =

Shopping mall in Kraków, Poland

Coordinates: 50°04′02″N 19°56′46″E

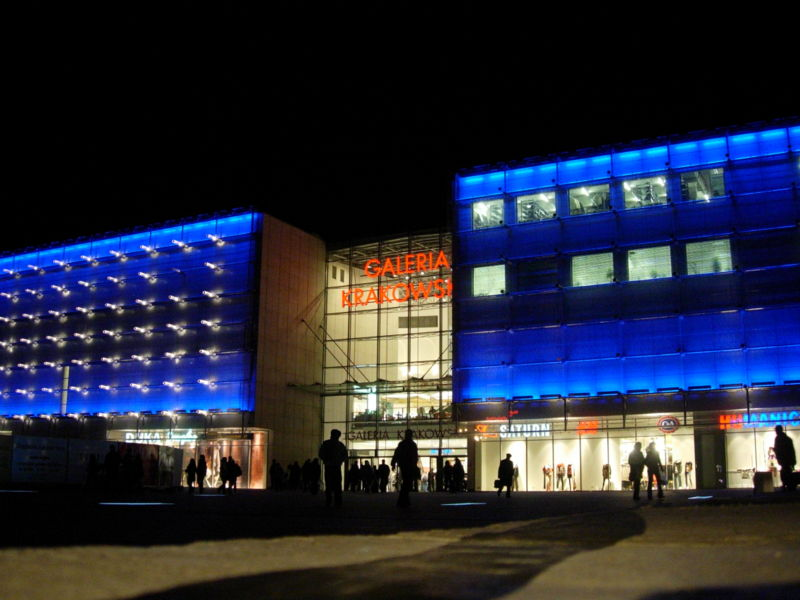
Galeria Krakowska - view of the front entrance

Galeria Krakowska is a shopping mall in Kraków, Poland, located adjacent to the city's main railway station.

== Development ==
Galeria Krakowska has 270 specialty shops, cafés, and restaurants on three floors in two roof-covered shopping malls and three plazas. Galeria Krakowska has over 55,470 square metres (600,000 sq ft) of retail floor space, 4,955 square metres (53,000 sq ft) of offices, as well as parking for 1,400 cars (free for the first hour).

It is part of an urban renewal project named ‘Nowe Miasto’ (English: New City) where instead of building shopping centres in greenfield land, the German project developer, ECE developed Galeria Krakowska in the busy inner city. Galeria Krakowska set new standards in architecture of shopping centers in Poland, and the development received the 2008 ICSC European Shopping Center Award in the category of "New Developments: Large".

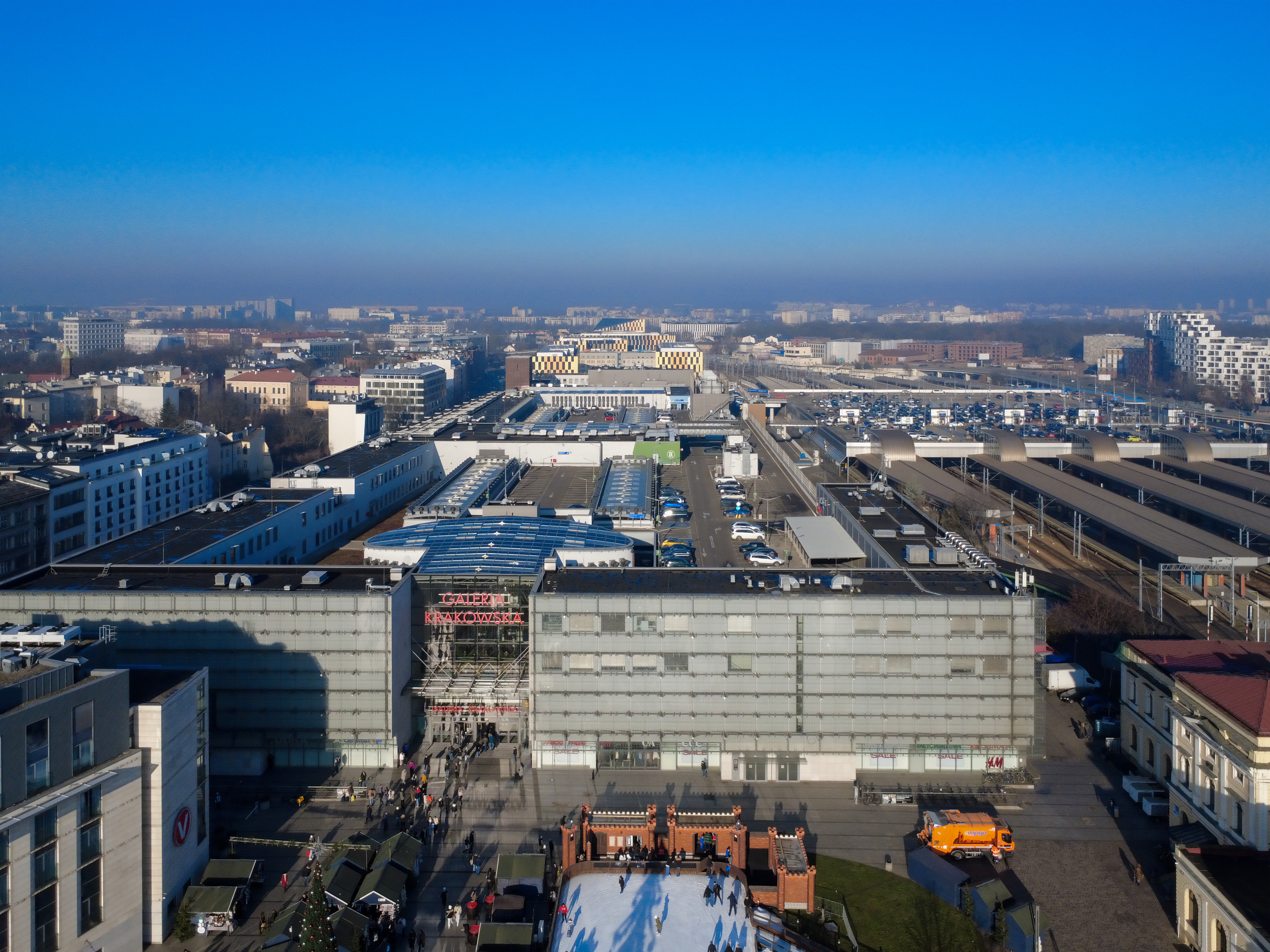
Galeria Krakowska (centre left) with Kraków Główny railway station (right) immersed in sunlight

== See also ==
- List of shopping malls in Poland
