= Kołobrzeg railway station =

Railway station in West Pomerania, Poland

Kołobrzeg
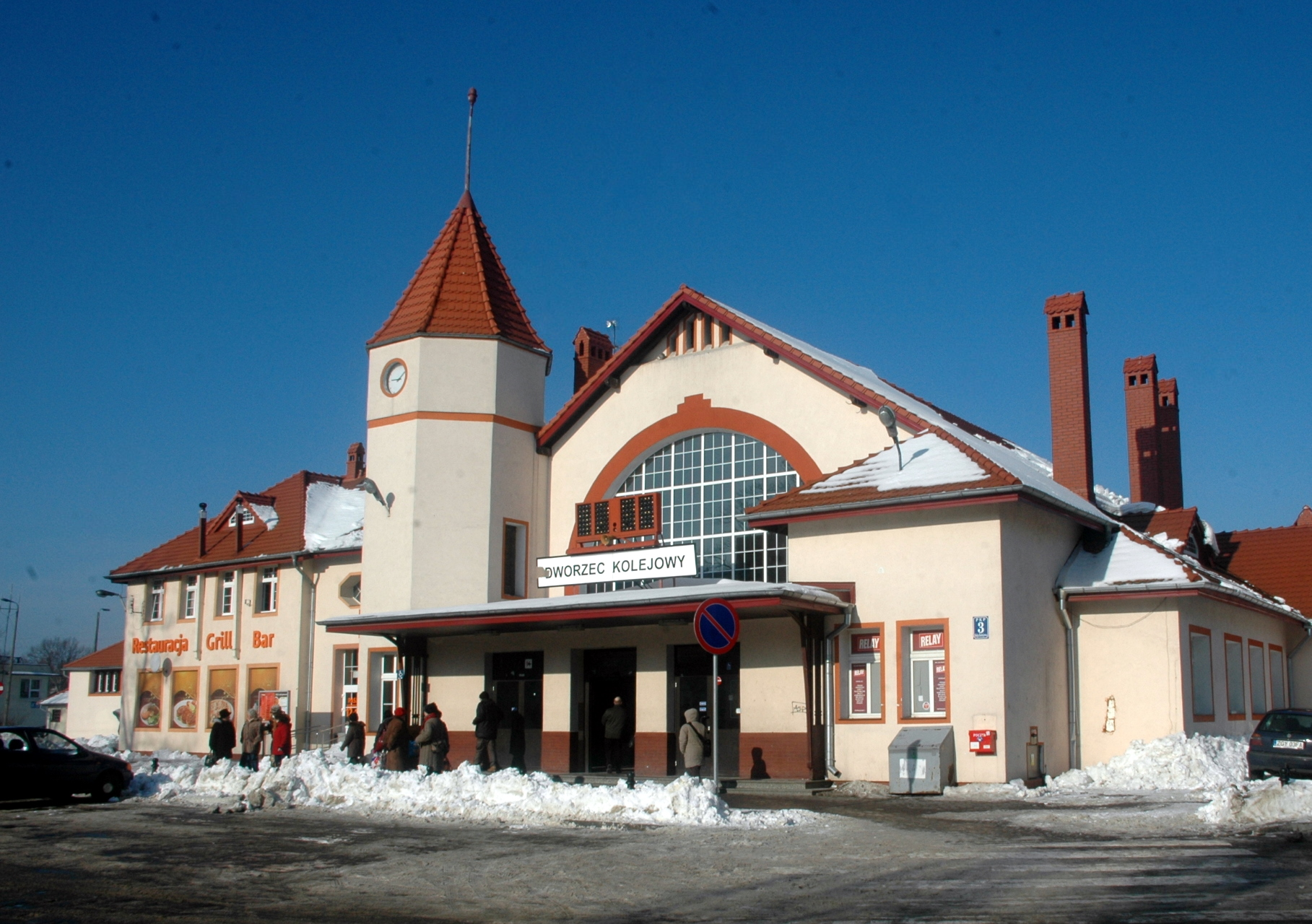
- Station building at Kołobrzeg railway station, February 2010

General information
- Location: Kołobrzeg, West Pomeranian; Poland
- Coordinates: 54.1821568°N 15.5693384°E
- Owner: Polskie Koleje Państwowe S.A.
- Lines: 402: Koszalin - Goleniow; 404: Szczecinek - Kolobrzeg
- Platforms: 2
- Tracks: 4

Construction
- Structure type: Building: Yes

History
- Opened: 1859
- Former names: Kolberg
Location

Kołobrzeg railway station is a railway station in Kołobrzeg, Poland. As of 2022, it is served by Polregio (local and InterRegio services) and PKP Intercity (EIP, InterCity, and TLK services).

== Train services ==
The station is served by the following services:

- Express Intercity Premium services (EIP) Kołobrzeg - Gdynia - Warsaw - Kraków
- Intercity services (IC) Łódź Fabryczna - Warszawa - Gdańsk - Kołobrzeg
- Intercity services (IC) Kołobrzeg - Piła - Bydgoszcz - Warszawa - Lublin - Hrubieszów
- Intercity services (IC) Kołobrzeg - Piła - Poznań - Wrocław - Opole - Kraków
- Intercity services (TLK) Kołobrzeg - Gdynia- Warszawa Wschodnia - Kraków
- Regional services (R) Słupsk — Koszalin — Kołobrzeg
- Regional services (R) Kołobrzeg — Koszalin
- Regional services (R) Kołobrzeg — Koszalin — Białogard — Szczecinek — Piła Główna — Poznań Główny
- Regional services (R) Koszalin — Kołobrzeg — Goleniów — Szczecin Główny

Preceding station	PKP Intercity	Following station
Terminus	EIP	Koszalin towards Kraków Główny
Terminus	IC	Ustronie Morskie towards Łódź Fabryczna
Terminus	IC	Białogard towards Hrubieszów Miasto
Terminus	IC Via Poznań Główny	Białogard towards Kraków Główny
Terminus	TLK Via Warszawa Wschodnia	Ustronie Morskie towards Kraków Główny
Preceding station	Polregio	Following station
Terminus	PR	Ustronie Morskie towards Słupsk
Terminus	PR	Ustronie Morskie towards Koszalin
Terminus	PR Via Koszalin	Ustronie Morskie towards Poznań Główny
Kołobrzeg Stadion towards Szczecin Główny	PR Via Kołobrzeg	Ustronie Morskie towards Koszalin
