= Kraków Główny railway station =

Railway station in Kraków, Poland

Kraków Główny
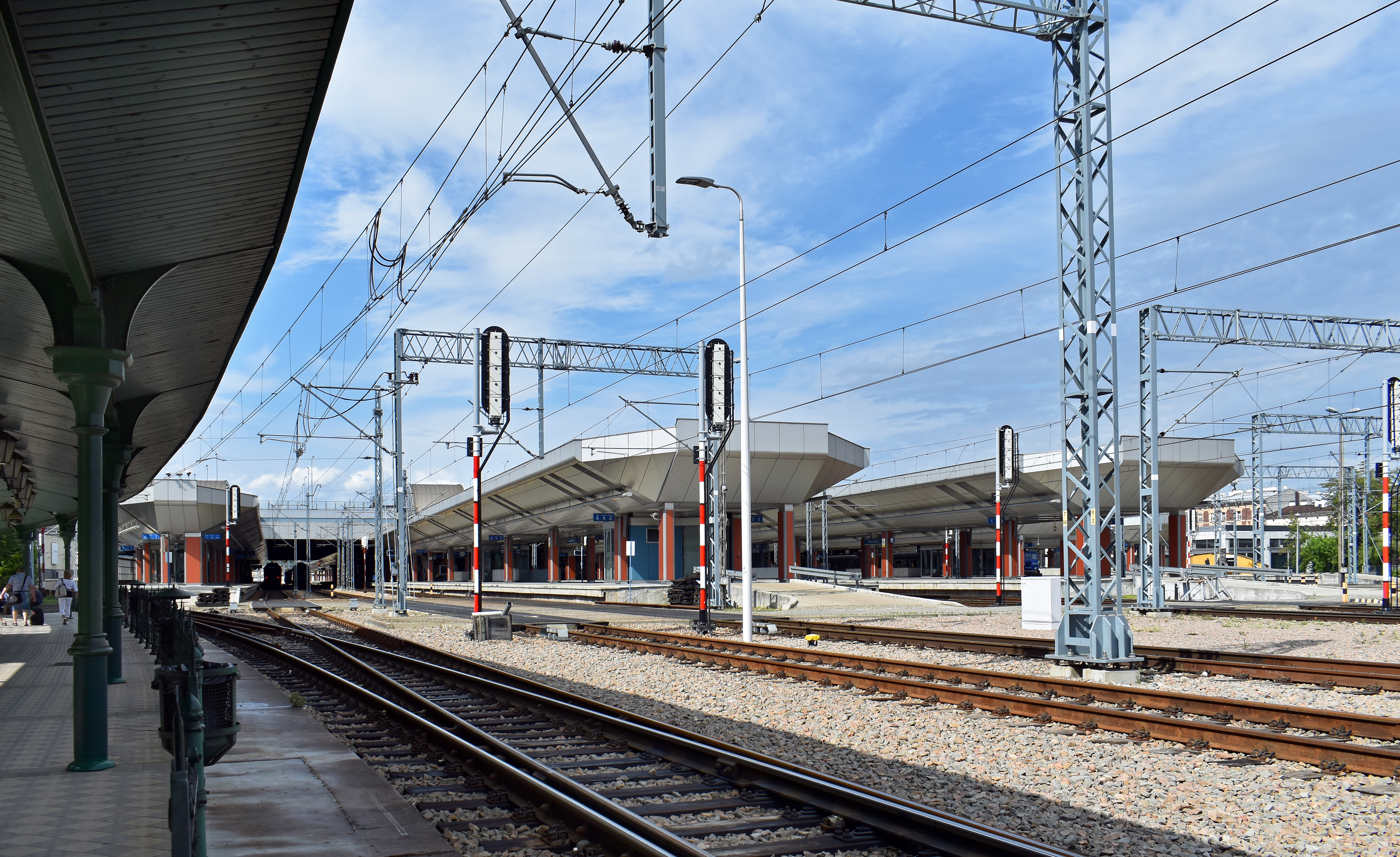
- Station platforms in July 2021.

General information
- Location: Kraków, Lesser Poland Voivodeship; Poland
- Coordinates: 50°03′56″N 19°56′50″E
- System: A
- Owner: PKP Polskie Linie Kolejowe
- Platforms: 10

History
- Opened: 1847
Location
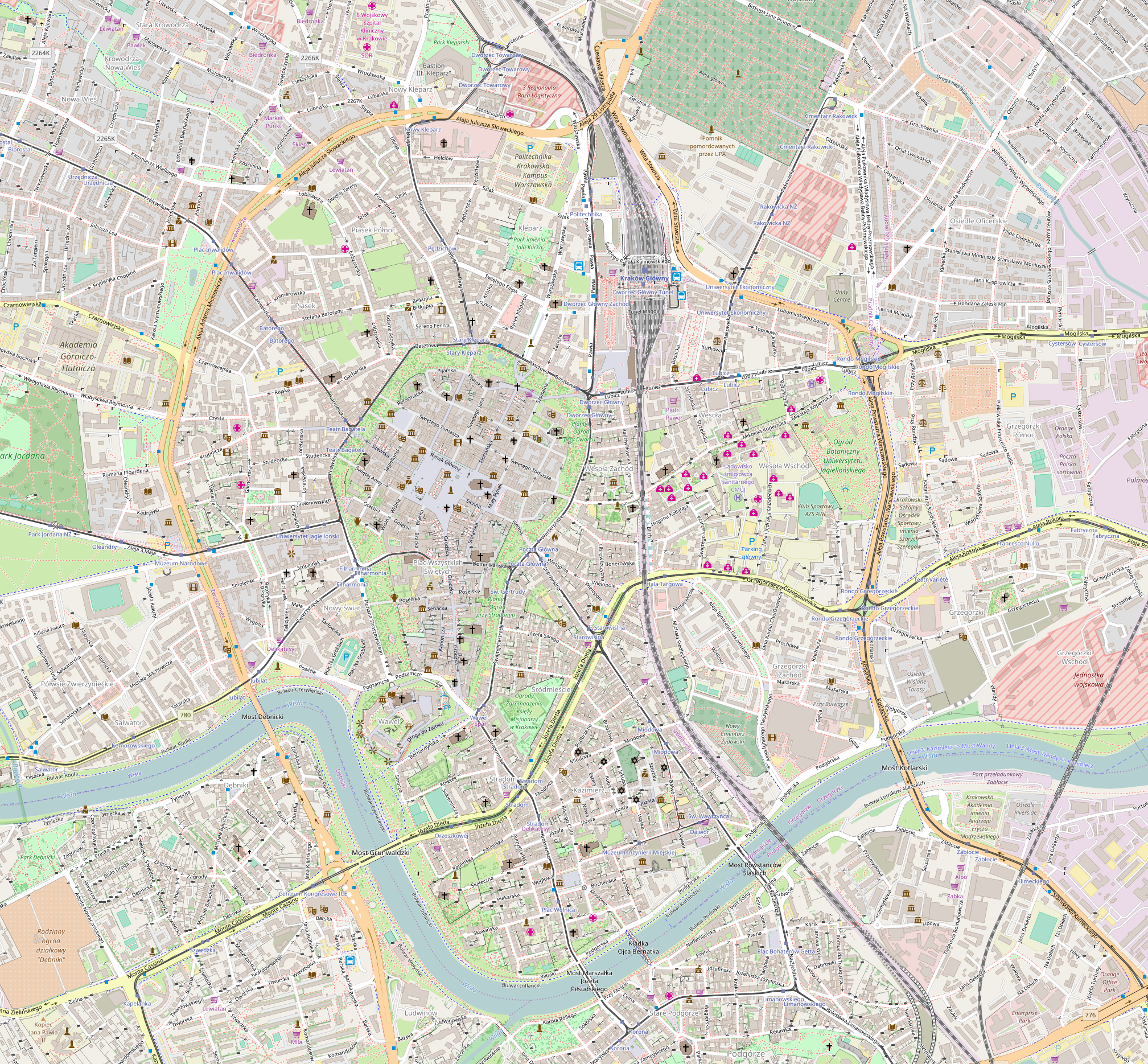
- Location within Central Kraków

Kraków Główny, in English Kraków Main, is the largest and the most centrally located railway station in Kraków, Poland.

The railway station was situated in a historical building, constructed between 1844 and 1847 by Rosenbaum, which lies parallel to the tracks. The design was chosen to allow for future line expansion. The station was initially a terminus of the Kraków – Upper Silesia Railway (Kolej Krakowsko-Górnośląska, German: Oberschlesische-Krakauer Eisenbahn). Trains entered the trainshed via a brick archway at the northern end of the station which was almost doubled in size in 1871. In 2014, a new building was opened.

In 2023, it served 23.4 million passengers, making it the country's third busiest railway station behind Wrocław Główny and Poznań Główny stations.

== History and early connections ==
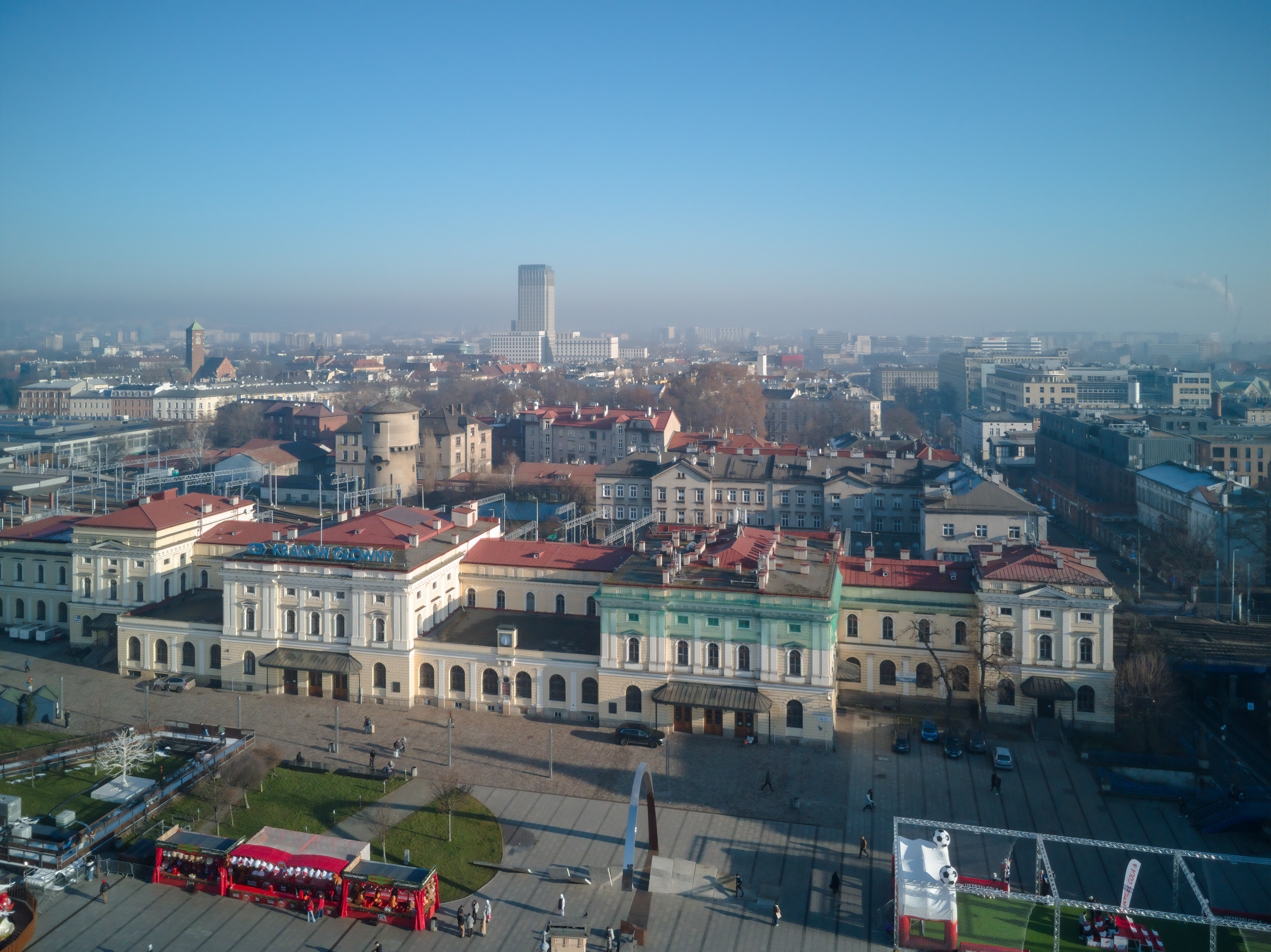
Former station building

The station opened on 13 October 1847, with the first train leaving for Mysłowice (the point where the Austrian, German and Russian Empires adjoined during era of the partitions of Poland).

The railway line was extended eastwards in 1856, when the first section to Dębica (then Dembitz in the Habsburg Empire) of the future Galician Railway of Archduke Charles Louis connecting Kraków with Lwów (then Lemberg) in Galicia. The increasing traffic resulted in the station's modernization and enlargement in several stages between 1869 and 1894. The next substantial expansion took place in the 1930s in the reborn Polish Republic. At that time the northern brick wall and trainshed were demolished, the latter replaced by individual platform roofs.

== Underground expansion and revitalisation ==
A new urban shopping mall, Galeria Krakowska (Kraków Mall), opened in September 2006 with adjacent parking for 1,400 cars. The construction of the Galeria Krakowska and remodeling of the area in front of the main station building means that taxis are no longer able to drive up to the station or collect passengers directly from the main entrance; however, the free overhead parking and passenger pick-up right above the tracks is now closer to the platforms, accessible via a convenient elevator.

The station has undergone a multi-million złoty refurbishment to improve passengers' experience.

A new transport interchange has been developed. This includes a bus station to the east, and an express tram line under the station which opened in December 2008.

A new underground ticket hall opened in February 2014, with waiting rooms, travel centers and other amenities. This is located to the north of the earlier platform underpass, and connected to the platforms by escalators. It also provides two new direct exits/entrances to the station complex, one from the lower level of Galeria Krakowska and another from the Regional Bus Station located to the east of the railway station. The current platform underpass will also be refurbished. As part of this large investment all platforms and tracks have been replaced.

== Train services ==
The station is served by the following service(s):

- EuroCity services (EC) (EC 95 by DB) (IC by PKP) Berlin - Frankfurt (Oder) - Rzepin - Wrocław – Katowice – Kraków – Rzeszów – Przemyśl
- Express Intercity Premium services (EIP) Warsaw - Kraków
- Express Intercity Premium services (EIP) Gdynia/Kołobrzeg - Warsaw - Kraków (- Rzeszów)
- Express Intercity services (EIC) Warsaw - Kraków - Zakopane
- Intercity services (IC) Warsaw - Kraków - Zakopane
- Intercity services (IC) Gdynia - Gdańsk - Bydgoszcz - Łódź - Czestochowa — Krakow — Zakopane
- Intercity services (IC) Łódź Fabryczna — Tomaszów Mazowiecki/Częstochowa — Kraków Główny
- Intercity services (IC) Poznań - Ostrów Wielkopolski - Kępno - Lubliniec - Częstochowa - Kraków
- Intercity services (IC) Kołobrzeg - Piła - Poznań - Wrocław - Opole - Kraków
- Intercity services (IC) Zielona Góra - Wrocław - Opele - Częstochowa - Kraków - Rzeszów - Przemyśl
- Intercity services (IC) Ustka - Koszalin - Poznań - Wrocław - Katowice - Kraków - Rzeszów - Przemyśl
- Intercity services (TLK) Poznań - Ostrów Wielkopolski - Kępno - Lubliniec - Częstochowa - Kraków
- Intercity services (TLK) Gdynia Główna — Zakopane
- Intercity services (TLK) Kołobrzeg — Gdynia Główna — Warszawa Wschodnia — Kraków Główny
- Regional services (PR) K2 Kraków Główny — Sędziszów — Kielce Główne
- Regional services (PR) K3 Katowice — Kraków Główny — Tarnów — Dębica — Rzeszów
- Regional services (PR) K32 Kraków Główny — Trzebinia — Oświęcim — Czechowice-Dziedzice
- Regional services (PR) K33 Kraków Główny — Jaworzno Szczakowa — Olkusz — Wolbrom
- Regional services (PR) K5 Kraków Główny — Skawina — Sucha Beskidzka — Chabówka — Nowy Targ — Zakopane
- Regional service (PR) K52 Kraków Główny — Skawina — Wadowice — Bielsko-Biała Główna
- Regional services (PR) K63 Kraków Główny — Kraków Nowa Huta — Podłęże
- Regional services (PR) K7 Kraków Główny — Tarnów — Nowy Sącz — Piwniczna — Krynica-Zdrój
- Regional services (KMŁ) SKA1 Kraków Lotnisko (Airport) — Kraków Główny — Wieliczka Rynek-Kopalnia
- Regional services (KMŁ) SKA2 Sędziszów — Miechów — Kraków Główny — Skawina — Przeciszów — Oświęcim (Auschwitz)
- Regional services (KMŁ) SKA3 Oświęcim (Auschwitz) — Trzebinia — Kraków Główny — Tarnów
- Regional services (KŚ) S3 Katowice — Mysłowice — Trzebinia — Krzeszowice — Kraków Główny
- Regional services (KŚ) S34 Częstochowa – Zawiercie — Dąbrowa Górnicza Ząbkowice — Trzebinia — Kraków Główny

=== International connections ===
- Kraków - Bohumin - Praha
- Kraków - Bohumin - Breclav - Budapest
- Kraków - Bohumin - Breclav - Wien
- Kraków - Bohumin - Breclav - Wien - Salzburg - Munich
- Kraków - Bohumin - Breclav - Wien - Graz
- Kraków - Bohumin - Breclav - Wien - Graz - Koper/Rijeka
- Kraków - Katowice - Wrocław - Berlin/Leipzig

Preceding station	PKP Intercity	Following station
Katowice towards Berlin Hbf	EuroCity EC 95; IC	Kraków Płaszów towards Przemyśl Główny
Warszawa Zachodnia towards Warszawa Wschodnia	EIP	Terminus
Warszawa Zachodnia towards Gdynia Główna or Kołobrzeg	EIP	Kraków Płaszów towards Rzeszów Główny
Warszawa Zachodnia towards Gdynia Główna or Kołobrzeg	EIP	Terminus
Warszawa Zachodnia towards Warszawa Wschodnia	EIC	Chabówka towards Zakopane
Miechów towards Warszawa Wschodnia	IC	Kalwaria Zebrzydowska Lanckorona towards Zakopane
Miechów towards Gdynia Główna	IC	Kalwaria Zebrzydowska Lanckorona towards Zakopane
Terminus	IC	Krzeszowice towards Poznań Główny
Terminus	IC	Miechów towards Łódź Fabryczna
Katowice towards Kołobrzeg	IC Via Poznań Główny	Terminus
Miechów towards Zielona Góra Główna	IC	Kraków Płaszów towards Przemyśl Główny
Krzeszowice towards Ustka	IC	Kraków Płaszów towards Przemyśl Główny
Terminus	TLK	Krzeszowice towards Poznań Główny
Koniecpol towards Gdynia Główna	TLK via Częstochowa	Kalwaria Zebrzydowska Lanckorona towards Zakopane
Miechów towards Gdynia Główna	TLK via Tomaszów Mazowiecki	Kalwaria Zebrzydowska Lanckorona towards Zakopane
Miechów towards Kołobrzeg	TLK Via Warszawa Wschodnia	Terminus
Preceding station	Polregio	Following station
Terminus	K2	Kraków Batowice towards Kielce Główne
Kraków Łobzów towards Katowice	K3	Kraków Grzegórzki towards Dębica or Rzeszów Główny
Terminus	K32	Kraków Łobzów towards Oświęcim or Czechowice-Dziedzice
Terminus	K33	Kraków Łobzów towards Olkusz or Wolbrom
Terminus	K5	Kraków Grzegórzki towards Sucha Beskidzka, Chabówka or Zakopane
Terminus	K52	Kraków Grzegórzki towards Bielsko-Biała Główna
Terminus	K63	Kraków Batowice towards Podłęże
Terminus	K7	Kraków Grzegórzki towards Nowy Sącz, Piwniczna, Muszyna or Krynica-Zdrój
Preceding station	KMŁ	Following station
Kraków Łobzów towards Kraków Lotnisko (Airport)	SKA1	Kraków Grzegórzki towards Wieliczka Rynek
Kraków Batowice towards Sędziszów	SKA2	Kraków Grzegórzki towards Przeciszów
Kraków Łobzów towards Oświęcim (Auschwitz)	SKA3	Kraków Grzegórzki towards Tarnów
Preceding station	KŚ	Following station
Kraków Łobzów towards Katowice	S3	Kraków Grzegórzki towards Kraków Płaszów
Kraków Łobzów towards Częstochowa	S34	Terminus

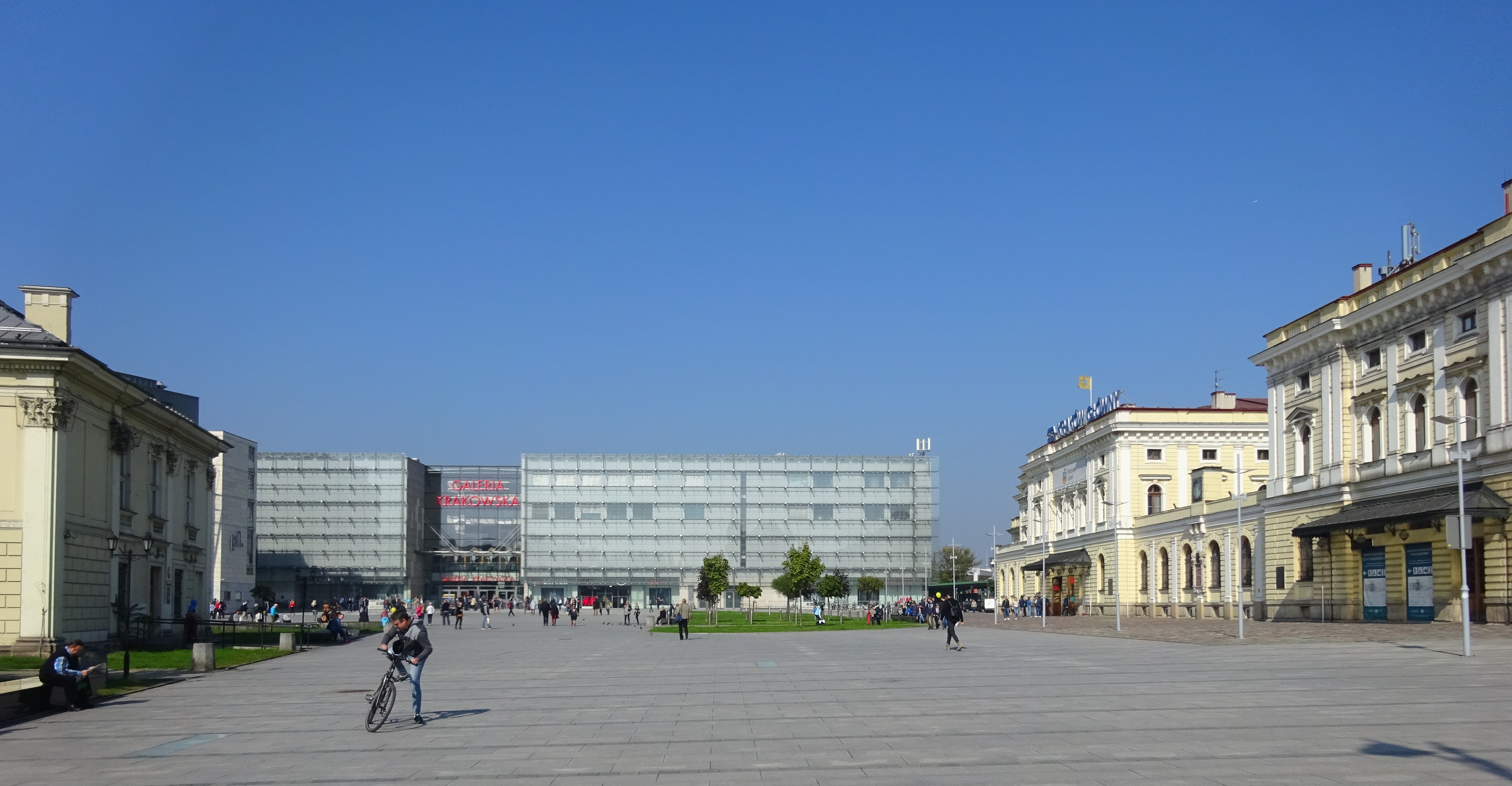
Main entrance promenade

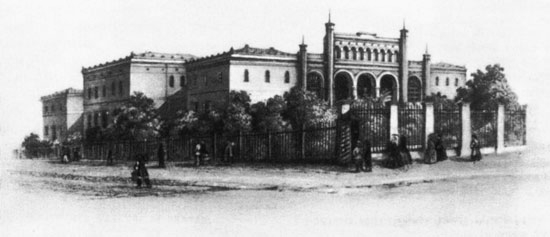
Original appearance of the station building in the 1850s

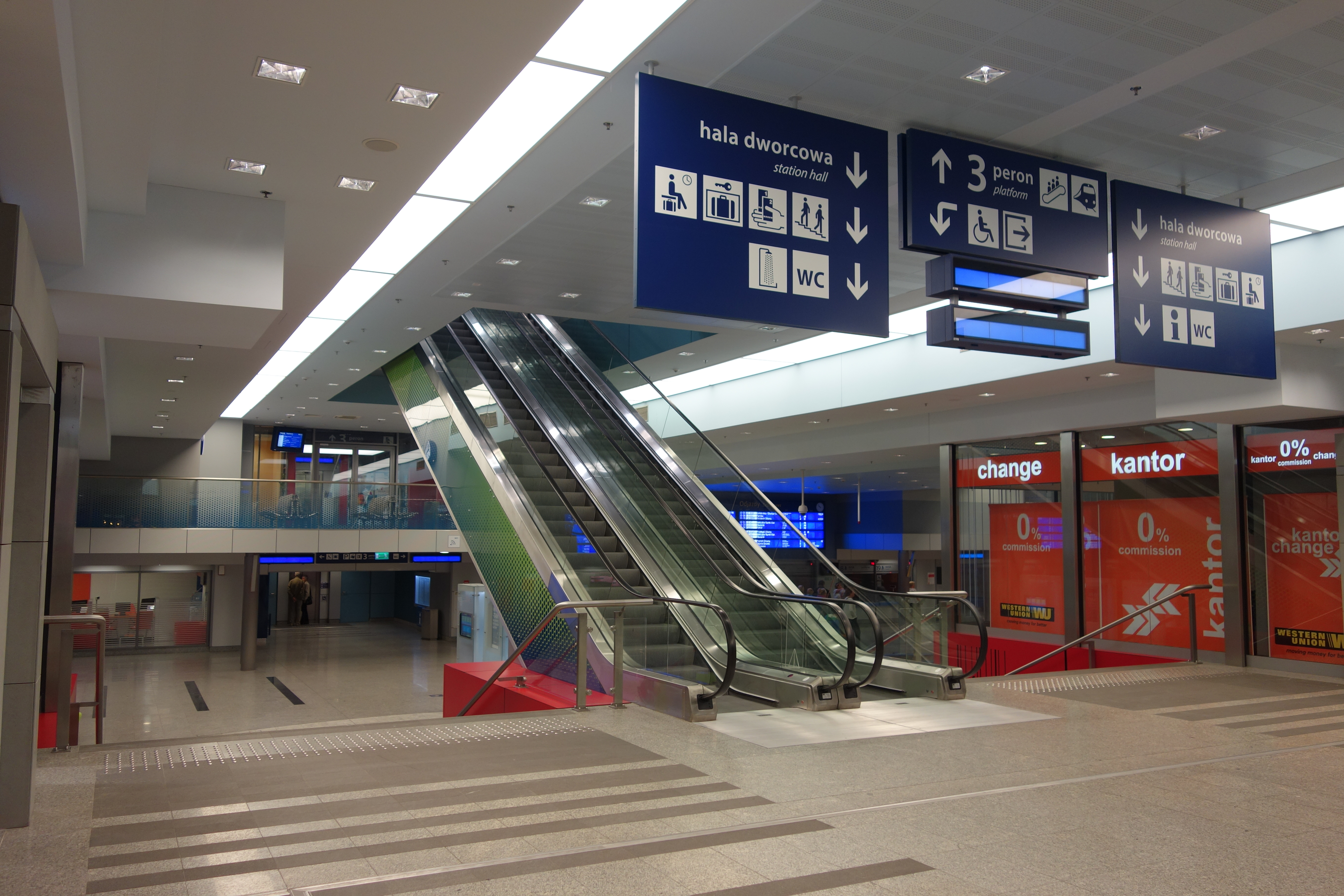
Interior of the Main Railway Station

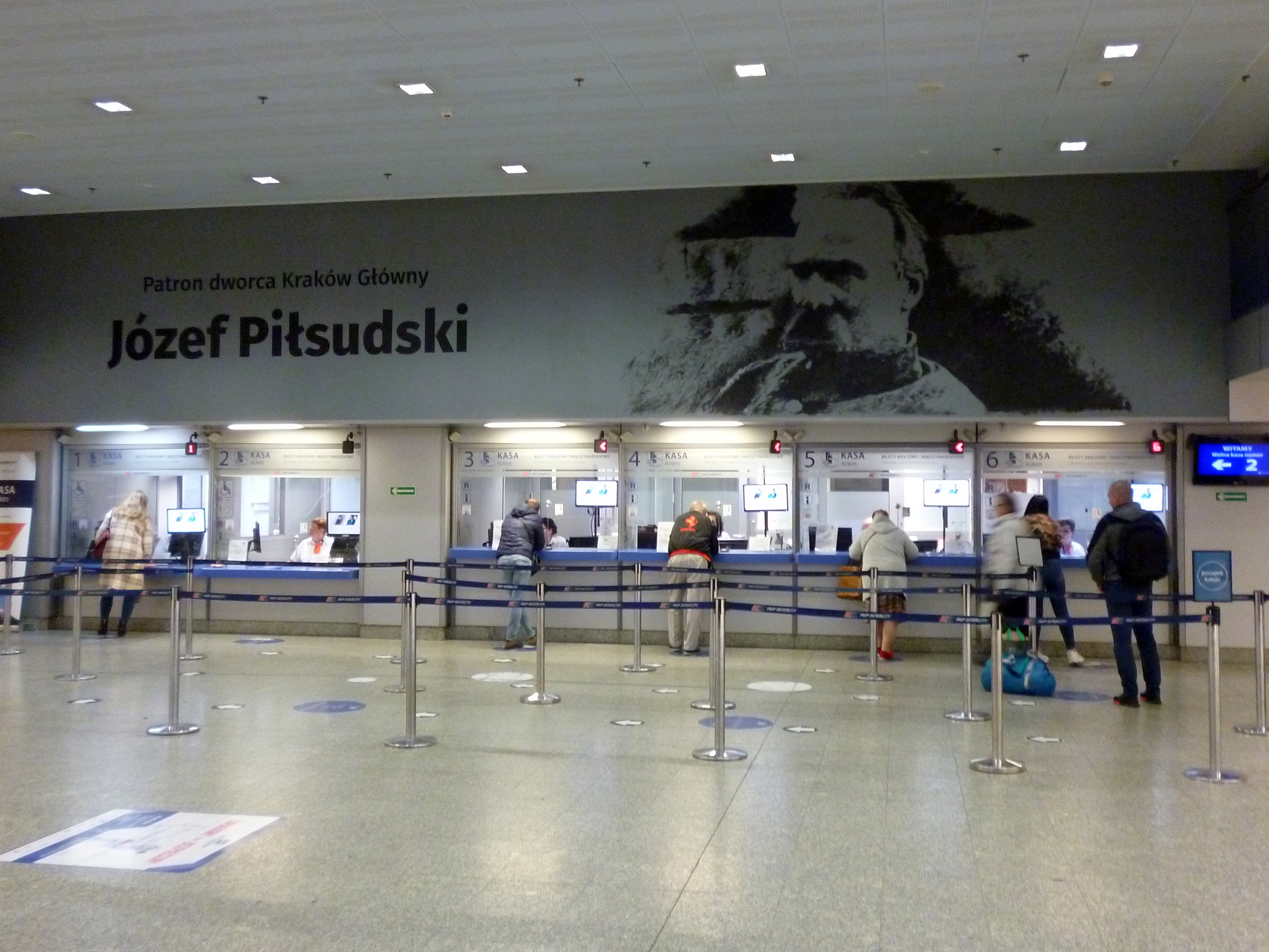
Ticket offices

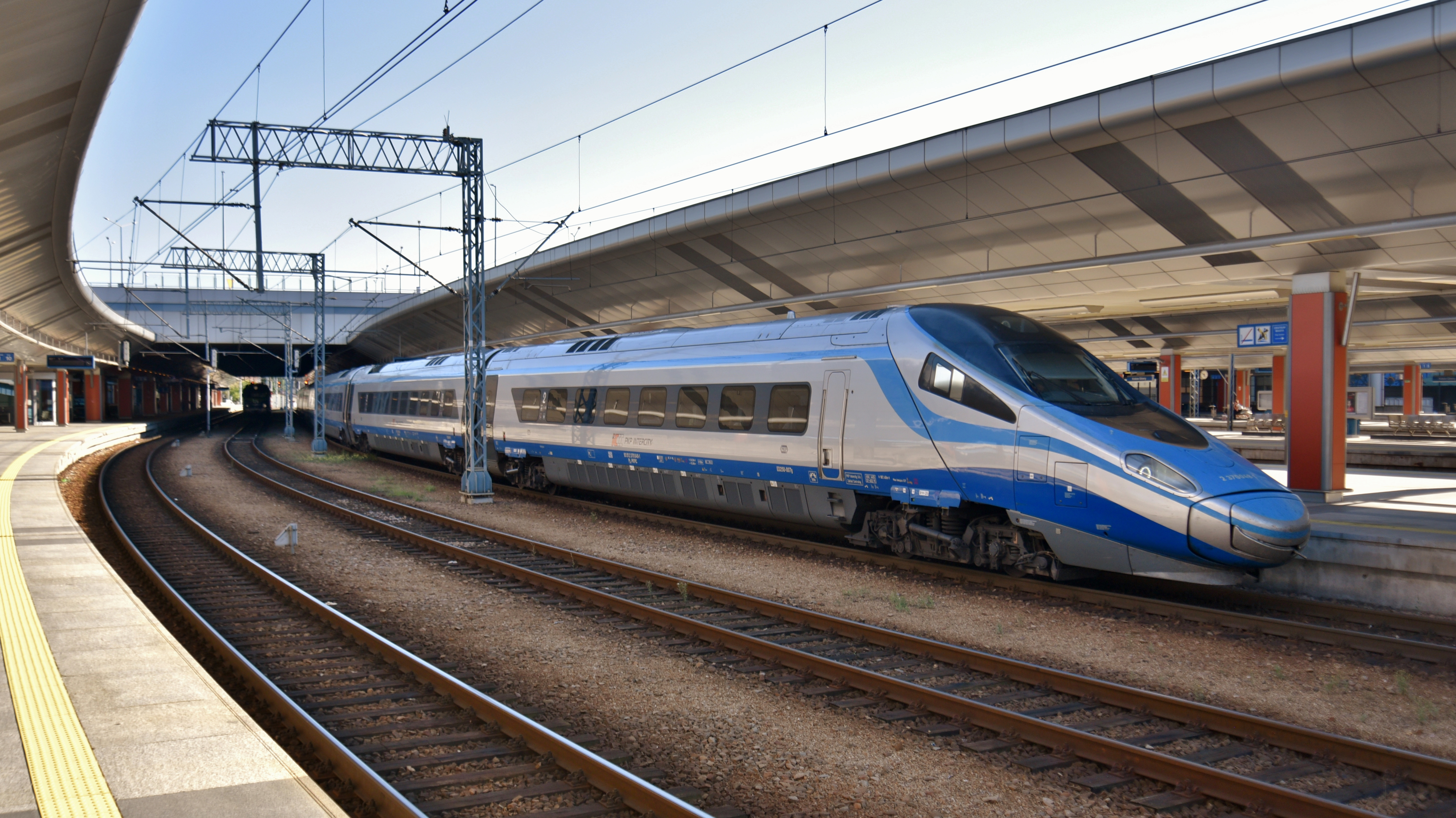
Pendolino PKP Intercity at the station

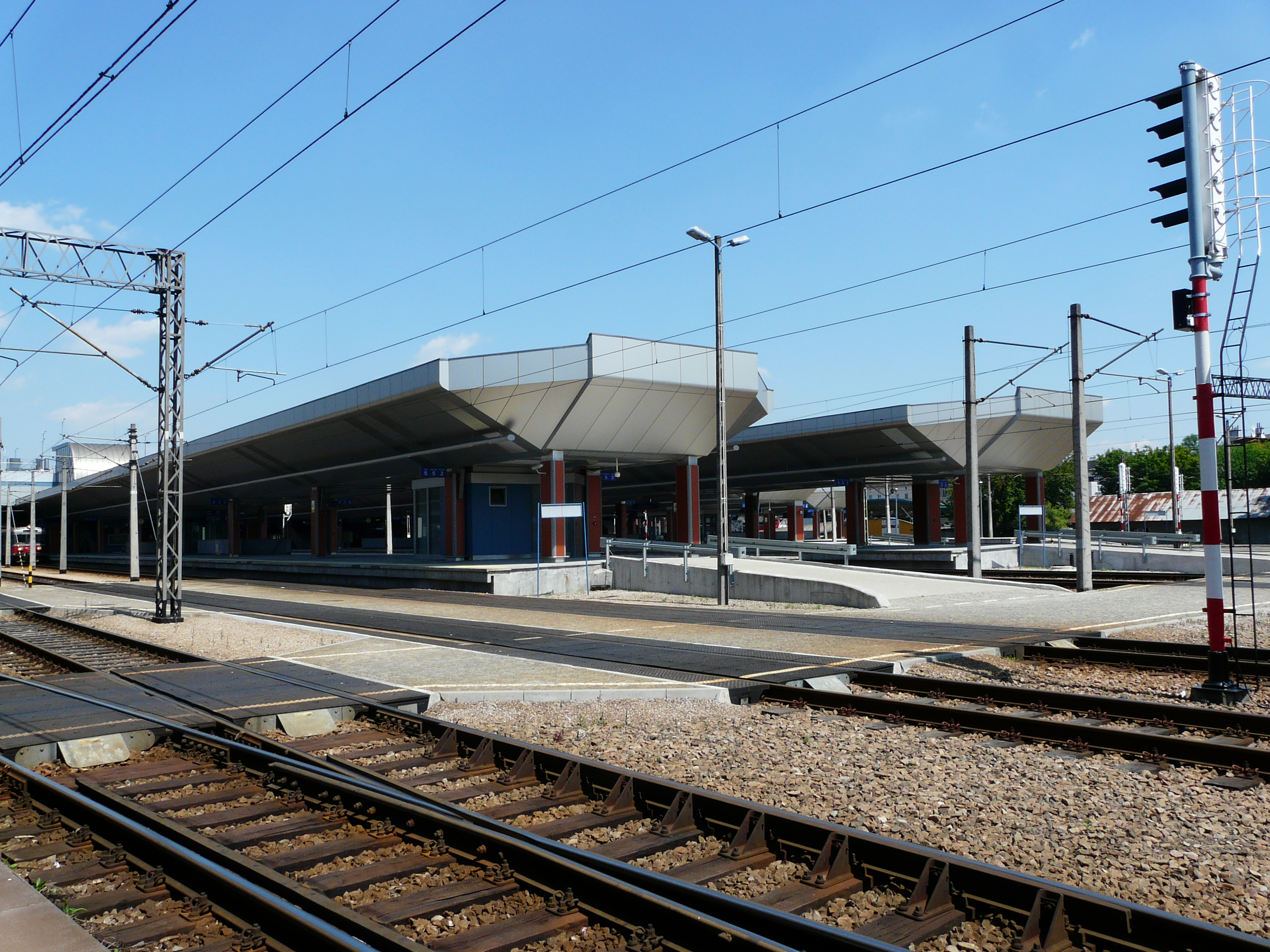
The Station island platforms

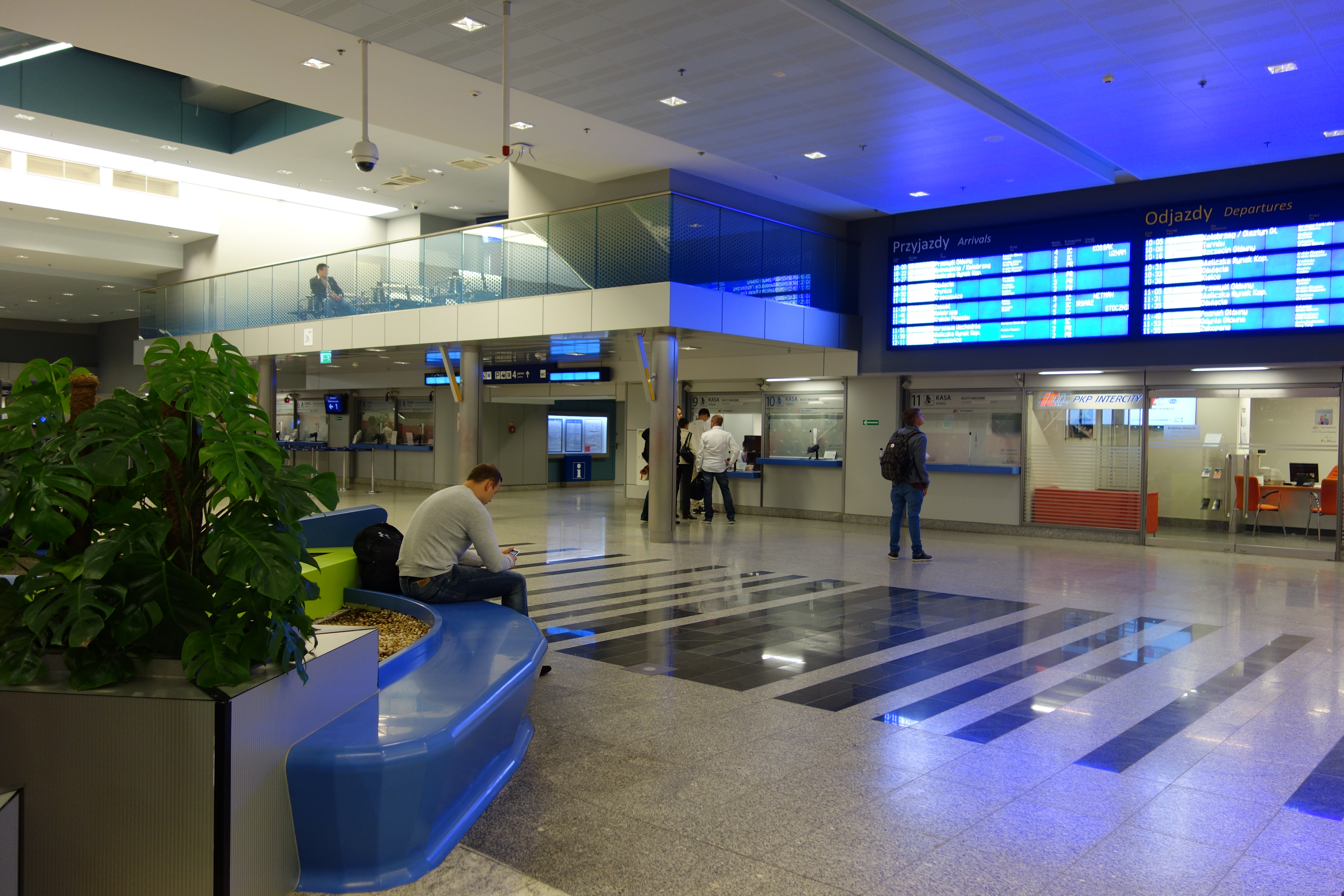
Departures. Interior

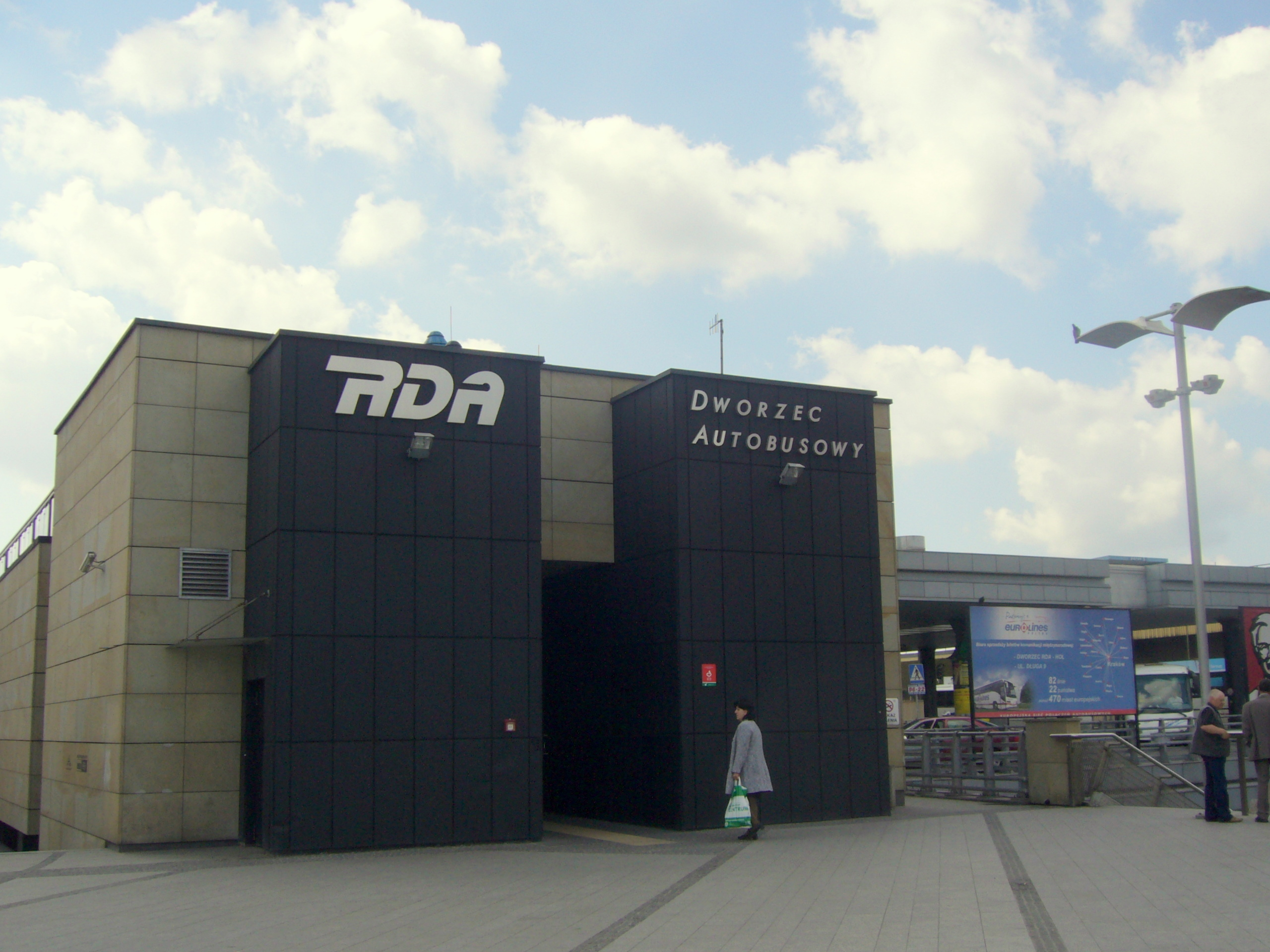
Long-distance bus terminal

== See also ==
- Dworzec Główny Tunel
