= Żory railway station =

Railway station in Żory, Poland

Żory
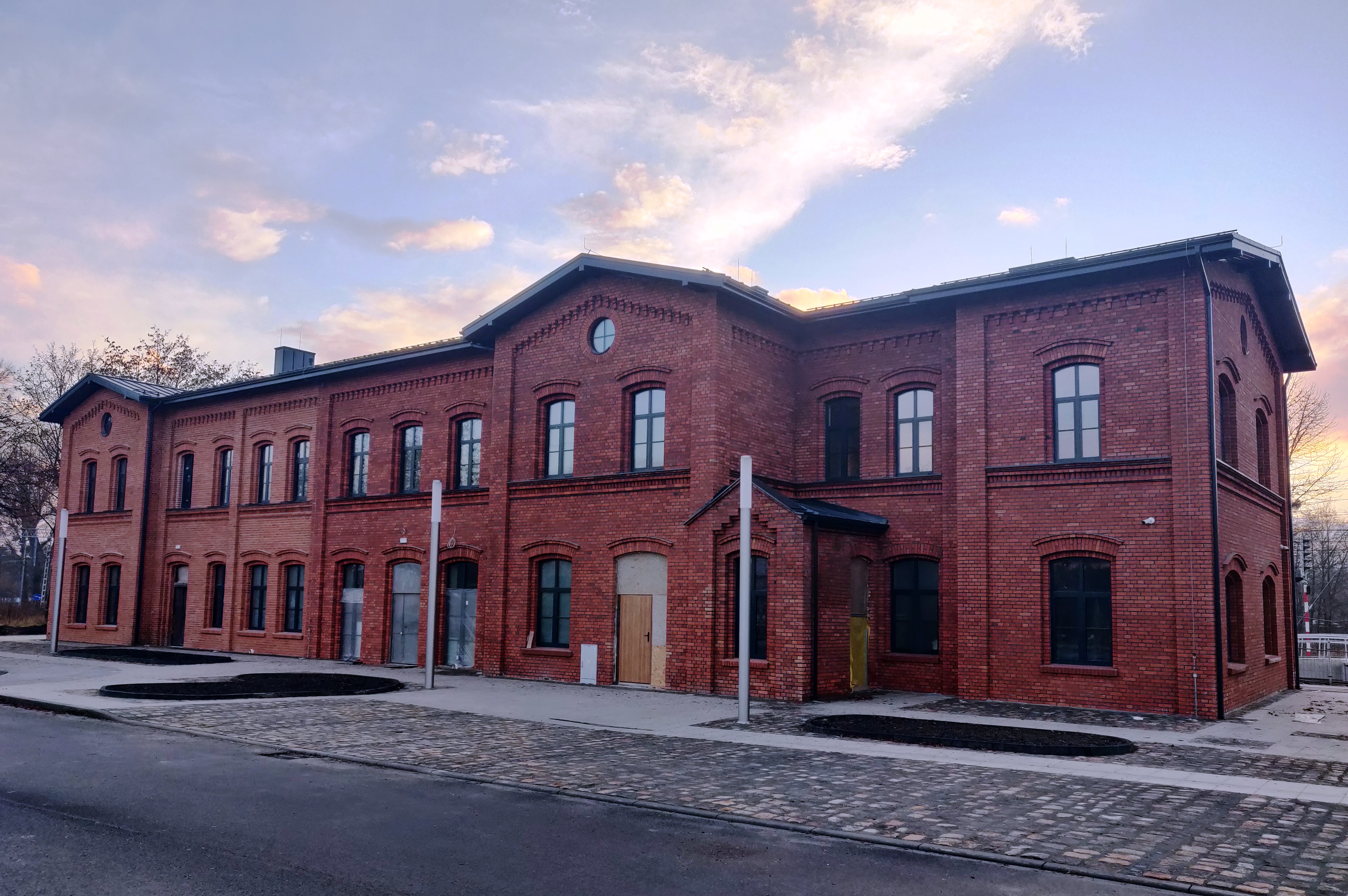

General information
- Location: Żory, Silesian; Poland
- Coordinates: 50°02′53″N 18°42′16″E
- Owner: Polskie Koleje Państwowe S.A.
- Platforms: 3
- Tracks: 5
- Train operators: PKP Intercity, Silesian Railways
- Bus routes: 03, 04, 06

Construction
- Structure type: Building: Yes

History
- Opened: 1884
- Former names: Sohrau

Services
Preceding station	PKP Intercity	Following station
Rybnik towards Ustka	IC	Czechowice-Dziedzice towards Bielsko-Biała Główna
Rybnik towards Bydgoszcz Główna	IC	Czechowice-Dziedzice towards Zakopane
Rybnik towards Graz	IC	Czechowice-Dziedzice towards Przemyśl Główny
Rybnik towards Świnoujście	TLK	Czechowice-Dziedzice towards Bielsko-Biała Główna
Rybnik towards Kołobrzeg	TLK	Czechowice-Dziedzice towards Bielsko-Biała Główna
Preceding station	KŚ	Following station
Szczejkowice towards Rybnik	S72	Suszec Rudziczka towards Pszczyna
Rybnik towards Gliwice	S75	Warszowice towards Zwardoń
Rybnik towards Gliwice	S76	Warszowice towards Wisła Głębce
Location

Żory railway station is a railway station in Żory, Poland. As of 2012, it is served by PKP Intercity (TLK and InterCity) and Silesian Railways (local services).

== Train services ==
The station is served by the following services:

- Intercity services (IC Szyndzielnia) Ustka - Koszalin - Poznań - Wrocław - Opole - Bielsko-Biała
- Intercity services (IC Halny) Bydgoszcz - Poznań - Leszno - Wrocław - Opole - Rybnik - Bielsko-Biała - Zakopane
- Intercity services (IC Porta Moravica) Graz - Vienna - Ostrava - Żory - Kraków - Przemyśl
- seasonal Intercity services (TLK Wolin) Świnoujście - Szczecin - Zielona Góra - Wrocław - Opole - Żory - Bielsko-Biała
- seasonal Intercity services (TLK Pirat) Kołobrzeg - Poznań - Gliwice - Żory - Bielsko-Biała
- Regional Service (KŚ) S72 Rybnik - Żory - Pszczyna
- Regional services (KŚ) S75 Rybnik - Żory - Czechowice-Dziedzice - Bielsko-Biała - Żywiec
- Regional services (KŚ) S76 Gliwice – Knurów – Rybnik – Żory– Chybie – Skoczów – Ustron – Wisła
