= Express InterCity Premium =

Highest-ranking category of trains operated by PKP Intercity

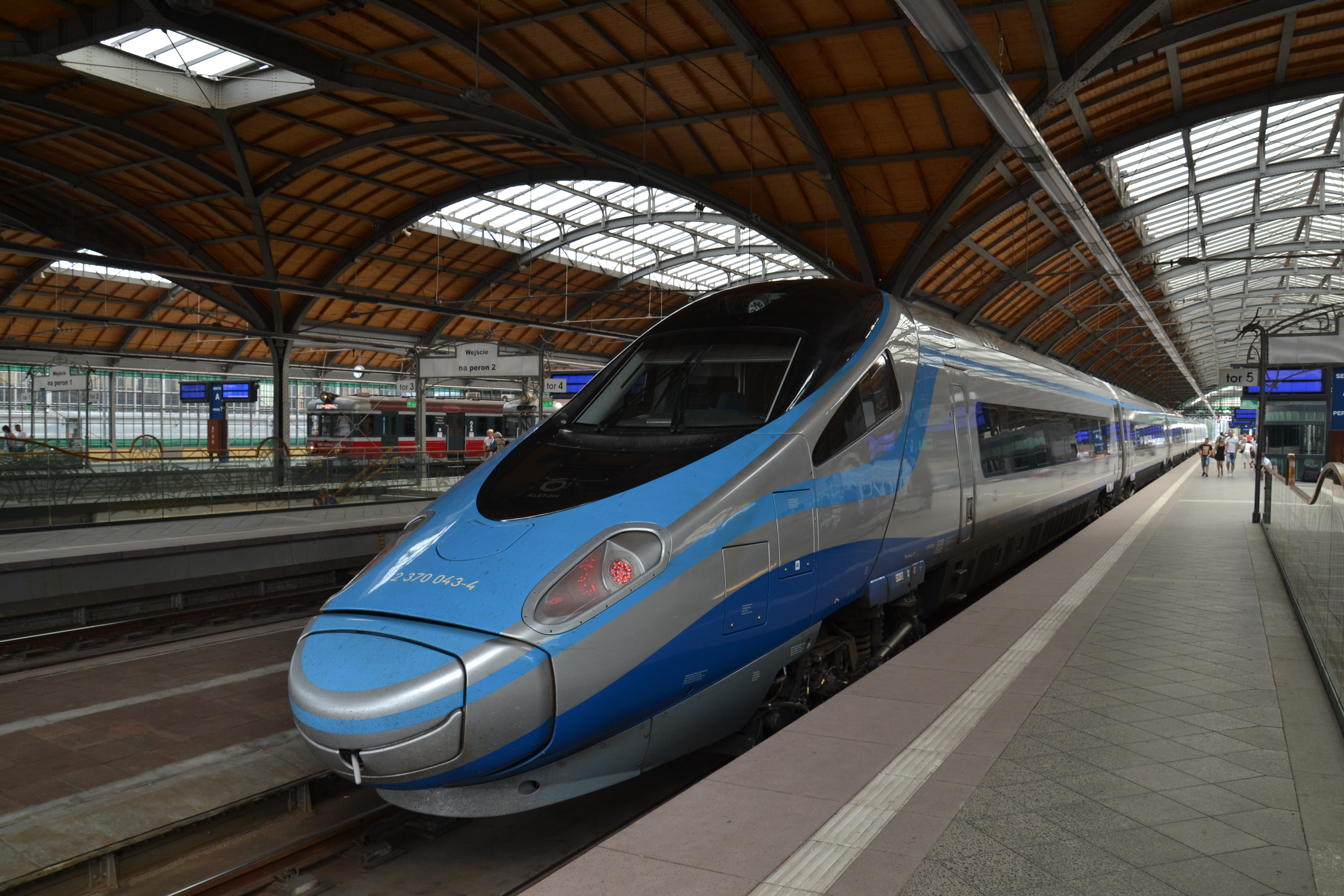
ED250 Pendolino at the Wrocław Główny railway station

Express InterCity Premium (EIP) is the highest-ranking category of trains operated by PKP Intercity.

Trains of the Express InterCity Premium category have been in service since 14 December 2014. They are operated using ED250 Pendolino electric multiple units and serve routes connecting Warsaw with Bielsko-Biała, Gliwice, Gdynia, Katowice, Kołobrzeg, Kraków, Rzeszów, Szczecin, and Wrocław.

The maximum speed of EIP trains is 200 km/h, making it the highest speed achieved in Poland during regular passenger operations. This speed is reached on approximately 140 kilometers of Grodzisk Mazowiecki–Zawiercie railway and 113 kilometers of Warsaw–Gdańsk railway.

== Name of the category and individual connections ==
On 28 May 2013, during a conference about the Alstom EMU250 trains produced for PKP Intercity at the Kazimierz Górski National Stadium in Warsaw, the new category of trains – Express InterCity Premium (EIP) – was first announced. The creation of this new category was aimed at distinguishing Pendolino-operated trains from other connections.

Most of the EIP connections replaced the earlier Intercity services, though they did not inherit their names, instead being assigned new numbers. Due to promotional activities, some connections were given temporary names. For example, in May 2015, one of the connections from Kraków to Gdynia was named EIP Radiowa Trójka, and in May 2016, one of the connections from Warsaw to Wrocław received the name EIP Teleexpress.

== Connections ==
Routes of trains from 2014 to 2025 since 14 December 2014 since 13 December 2015 since 29 April 2016 since 15 December 2024 since 14 December 2025

When EIP trains were launched on 14 December 2014, the following connections were established from Warsaw (with stops at Warszawa Zachodnia, Warszawa Centralna, and Warszawa Wschodnia):

- Gdynia Główna (with stops at Iława Główna, Malbork, Tczew, Gdańsk Główny, Gdańsk Wrzeszcz, Gdańsk Oliwa, and Sopot)
- Kraków Główny
- Katowice (with stops at Włoszczowa Północ and Sosnowiec Główny)
- Wrocław Główny (with stops at Częstochowa Stradom, Lubliniec, and Opole Główne)

Due to delays in the delivery of ED250 Pendolino units, fewer EIP connections were launched than originally planned, and instead of most cancelled EIP services, Express InterCity connections were operated with conventional train sets.

During the annual timetable change on 13 December 2015, some connections were extended to:

- Bielsko-Biała Główna (extension of the connection to Katowice with additional stops in Tychy, Pszczyna, and Czechowice-Dziedzice)
- Gliwice (extension of the connection to Katowice with an additional stop in Zabrze)
- Rzeszów Główny (extension of the connection to Kraków with additional stops in Kraków Płaszów, Tarnów, and Dębica)

Additionally, extra stops were added for some connections in Ciechanów, Działdowo, and Zawiercie.

On 13 March 2016 some connections to Wrocław were temporarily rerouted from Grodzisk Mazowiecki–Zawiercie railway to Warszawa Zachodnia-Katowice line, which resulted in longer travel times and a stop at Częstochowa instead of Częstochowa Stradom due to repair works on Grodzisk Mazowiecki–Zawiercie railway.

On 29 April 2016 the connection network was expanded for the second time, introducing new connections to:

- Jelenia Góra (extension of the connection to Wrocław with an additional stop in Wałbrzych Miasto)
- Kołobrzeg (extension of the connection to Gdynia with additional stops in Lębork, Słupsk, and Koszalin)

Between 6 and 11 August 2016, due to repair work at Biała Rawska railway station, train traffic between Grodzisk Mazowiecki and Idzikowice was completely suspended, with trains rerouted via Koluszki, Tomaszów Mazowiecki, and Idzikowice to Kraków, and via Skierniewice, Koluszki, and Częstochowa to Katowice.

On 11 December 2016, during another timetable change, a new stop was added in Bochnia for trains to and from Rzeszów.

On 7 April 2017, a truck collided with one of the EIP trains running on the single-track section between Opole and Częstochowa, requiring the EIP trains to be rerouted through Strzelce Opolskie, bypassing Lubliniec and adding a stop in Kochanowice.

Between 10 July and 10 August 2017, due to a 24-hour closure on the Grodzisk Mazowiecki–Zawiercie railway between Opoczno Południe and Włoszczowa Północ/Knapówka, most EIP trains were rerouted via Skierniewice and Częstochowa. Additionally, two EIP connections from Warsaw to Jelenia Góra ran via Łódź Widzew.

In the second half of March 2020, due to the COVID-19 pandemic, EIP train services were temporarily suspended.

With the new timetable on 15 December 2024, EIP trains began operating on a new route from Warszawa Wschodnia to Szczecin Główny (with additional stops at Poznań Główny, Krzyż, Stargard, and Szczecin Dąbie). At the same time, these trains were withdrawn from the Wrocław Główny to Jelenia Góra route, and all stops in Ciechanów and Włoszczowa Północ were discontinued.

On 14 December 2025, EIP introduced a regular connection between Gdynia and Zakopane.

== Rolling stock ==
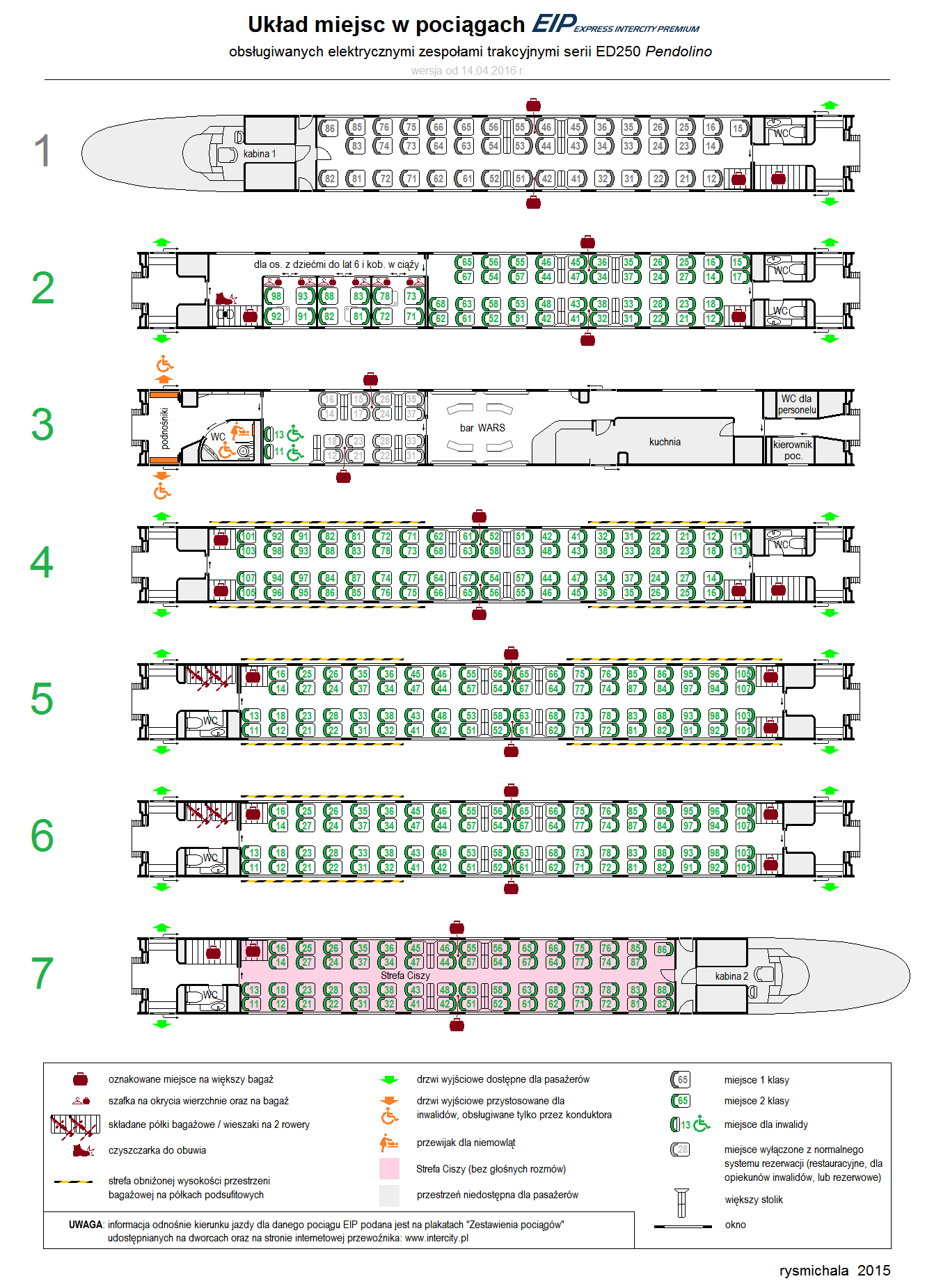
Seating layout in EIP trains

The EIP services are operated by 20 ED250 Pendolino units, which were produced by the Alstom company. The purchase agreement, valued at 665 million euros (2.64 billion PLN), was signed on 30 May 2011 and also included the construction of technical facilities and the maintenance of the trains for up to 17 years.

Each ED250 train consists of 7 carriages, with a total of 402 seats: 341 in 2nd class, 45 in 1st class, 2 seats for disabled passengers, and 14 in the bar area. The trains are air-conditioned, allow for bicycle transport, feature a bar area, a quiet zone, and provide free refreshments.

== Maximum speed ==
The maximum operational speed of the ED250 trains is 250 km/h; however, in regular passenger service, they do not exceed 200 km/h, as there are no railway lines in Poland adapted for higher speeds. EIP-category trains are the first in Eastern Central Europe to operate at this speed in regular passenger service.

On the launch date of the EIP category (14 December 2014), the maximum speed of 200 km/h was introduced on a section of Grodzisk Mazowiecki–Zawiercie railway from km 125.200 to km 212.200 (between Olszamowice and Zawiercie), excluding km 151.900–155.430 (Włoszczowa Północ railway station) and km 142.850–149.500 (where level crossings are located). The total length of sections with a permitted speed of 200 km/h was 76.820 km. On 12 March 2017, modernization work began at the Olszamowice and Włoszczowa Północ railway stations, reducing the length of the 200 km/h section to 58.304 km (km 156.496–214.800).

On 10 December 2017, a speed limit of 200 km/h was introduced on the Grodzisk Mazowiecki–Idzikowice section (80 km).

On 13 December 2020, the speed was increased to 200 km/h on sections of Warsaw–Gdańsk railway, totaling 113 km, while speeds between 170 and 190 km/h became possible on sections measuring 47 km in total.

== Transport results ==
In early March 2015, EIP trains reached a milestone of one million kilometers with passengers. On 19 May, the one-millionth passenger was transported, and on 7 August, the two-millionth passenger was carried. During the first year of operation, 3.56 million passengers were transported, and the trains traveled 6.32 million kilometers.

On 25 June 2016, EIP trains reached a total of 10 million kilometers, with 5.7 million passengers transported on board.
