= Tychy railway station =

Railway station in Tychy, Poland

Tychy
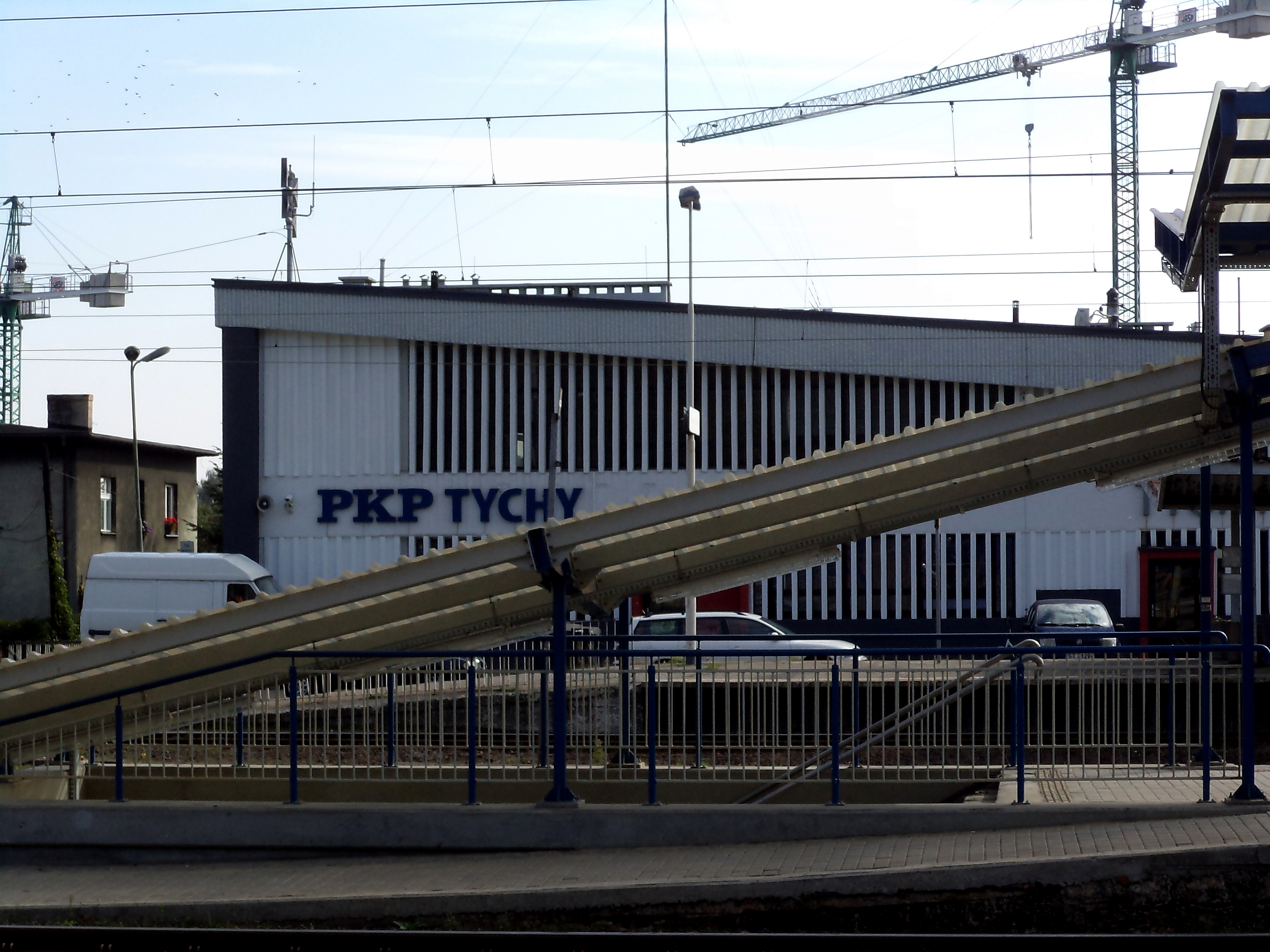

General information
- Location: Tychy, Silesian; Poland
- Coordinates: 50°08′11″N 18°57′51″E
- Owner: Polskie Koleje Państwowe S.A.
- Platforms: 3
- Tracks: 6

Construction
- Structure type: Building: Yes

History
- Opened: 1868
- Former names: Tichau

Services
Preceding station	PKP Intercity	Following station
Katowice towards Gdynia Główna	EIP	Pszczyna towards Bielsko-Biała Główna
Katowice towards Warszawa Wschodnia	EIP	Pszczyna towards Bielsko-Biała Główna
Katowice towards Warszawa Wschodnia or Białystok	IC	Pszczyna towards Bielsko-Biała Główna
Pszczyna towards Bielsko-Biała Główna	IC	Katowice towards Olsztyn Główny
Preceding station	KŚ	Following station
Tychy Zachodnie towards Tychy Lodowisko	S4	Katowice Podlesie towards Katowice
Tychy Zachodnie towards Tychy Lodowisko	S41	Katowice Podlesie towards Częstochowa
Katowice Podlesie towards Katowice	S5	Tychy Żwaków towards Zwardoń
Katowice Podlesie towards Katowice	S51	Tychy Żwaków towards Zakopane
Katowice Piotrowice towards Katowice	S6	Pszczyna towards Wisła Głębce
Location
- Location within Poland

Tychy railway station is a railway station in Tychy, Poland. As of 2012, it is served by PKP Intercity (Ekspres and TLK services), Polregio (local and InterRegio services) and Silesian Railways. The station was opened in 1868

== Train services ==
The station is served by the following service(s):

- Express Intercity Premium services (EIP) Warsaw - Katowice - Bielsko-Biała
- Express Intercity Premium services (EIP) Gdynia - Warsaw - Katowice - Gliwice/Bielsko-Biała
- Intercity services (IC) Warszawa - Częstochowa - Katowice - Bielsko-Biała
- Intercity services (IC) Białystok - Warszawa - Częstochowa - Katowice - Bielsko-Biała
- Intercity services (IC) Olsztyn - Warszawa - Skierniewice - Częstochowa - Katowice - Bielsko-Biała
- Regional services (KŚ) S4 Tychy Lodowisko - Katowice
- Regional services (KŚ) S41 Tychy Lodowisko - Katowice - Sosnowiec Główny - Dąbrowa Górnicza Ząbkowice - Zawiercie
- Regional Service (KŚ) S5 Katowice - Pszczyna - Czechowice-Dziedzice - Bielsko-Biała Gł. - Żywiec - Zwardoń
- Regional services (KŚ) S51 Katowice - Pszczyna - Bielsko-Biała Gł - Żywiec - Nowy Targ - Zakopane
- Regional Service (KŚ) S6 Katowice - Pszczyna - Skoczów - Ustroń - Wisła Głębce
