= Pesa Gama =

Family of locomotives

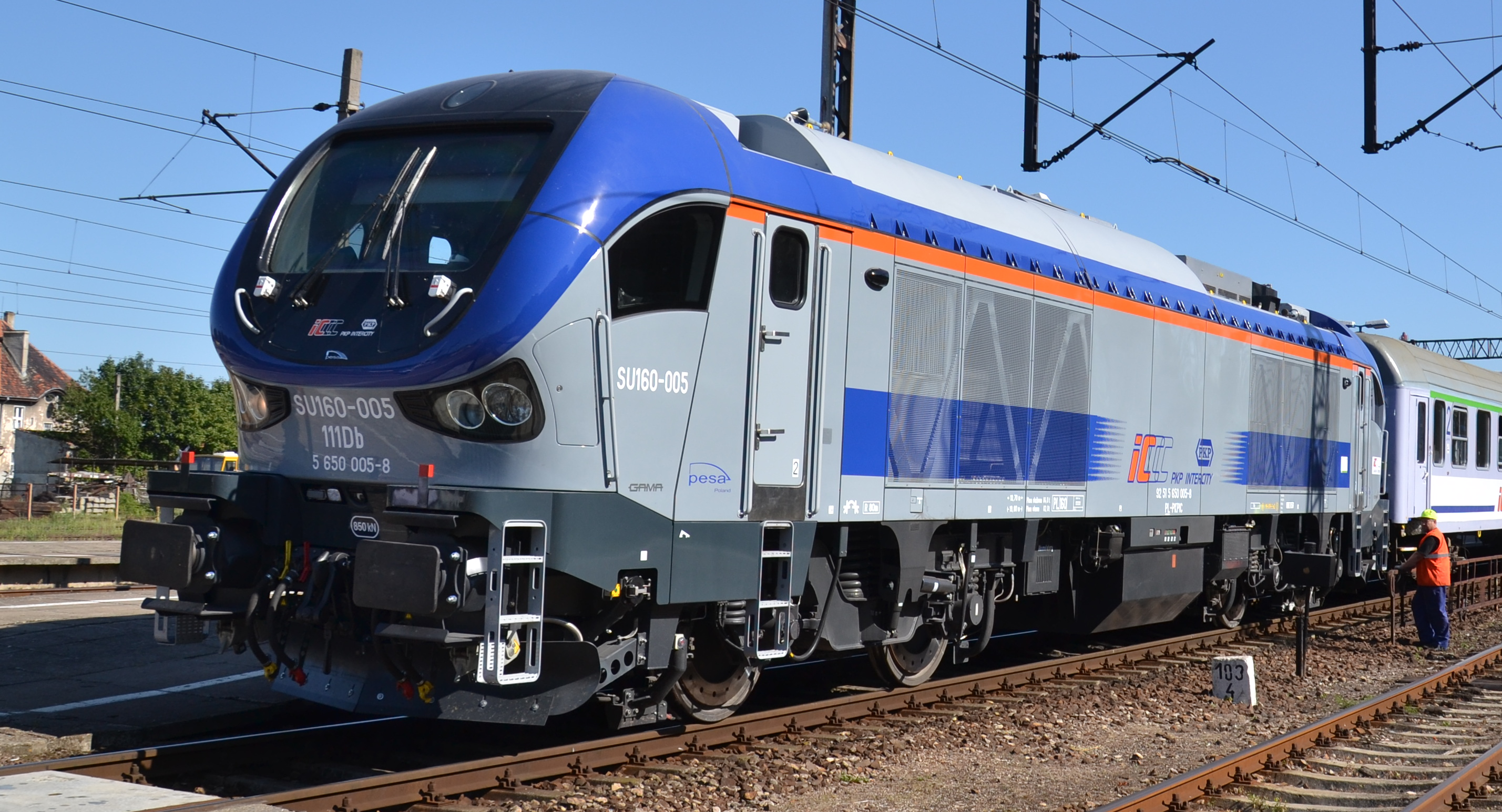
- SU160-005 in Ełk
Type and origin
- Power type: Electric; Diesel; Bi-mode
- Builder: Pesa SA
- Build date: 2012–present
- Total produced: 137
- Website: Locomotive specs
Specifications
- Configuration
  - UIC: Bo'Bo'
- Gauge: 1,435 mm (4 ft 8 1/2 in)
- Length: 19.8 metres (65 ft 0 in)
- Width: 3.0 metres (9 ft 10 in)
- Fuel type: Diesel
- Electric system/s: 3 kV DC; 1.5 kV DC; 15 kV AC; 25 kV AC; (any one or more in combination)
- Prime mover: Diesel: MTU 16V 4000 R84; Bi-mode: Caterpillar C15 ACERT
- Aspiration: Turbocharger
- Traction motors: 4 x
- Cylinders: 16
- Transmission: Electro-diesel
- MU working: Yes
- Loco brake: Air brake
- Train brakes: Air brake
- Safety systems: SHP, DSD
Performance figures
- Maximum speed: 160 km/h (100 mph)
- Power output: Electric: 5,600 kW (7,500 hp); Diesel: 2,400 kW (3,200 hp); Bi-mode diesel: 403 kW (540 hp)
- Tractive effort
  - Starting: 320 kN (72,000 lb_{f})
Career
- Operators: PKP Intercity; Masovian Railways; various
- Class: PKP IC: SU160

Pesa Gama is a family of diesel and electric locomotives built from 2012 by Pesa SA company.

== History ==
=== Origin ===
In 2001, Pesa announced that it would change its main focus from repairing locomotives to building its own locomotives. Initially, only two units were built: the first was a mixed-traffic electric locomotive with an additional diesel engine; the second was a pure diesel locomotive. Since then, a variety of diesel- and electric-powered locomotives have been built. As of June 2025, there are 137 locomotives in service in four different versions.

=== The Gama Marathon ===
The first model of the family was the 111Ed Marathon locomotive. Its construction began in early 2012, and premiered on September 18 at the InnoTrans Trade Fair 2012 in Berlin. The first test drive took place in October 2012 in Bydgoszcz Wschód Station, and later on the railway lines to Inowrocław, Poznań and Zduńska Wola Karsznice. The behavior of the locomotive was tested working goods trains with different loads until 25 November 2012. From 27 November 2012 to 3 December 2012 the locomotive had been tested on the test track in Żmigród, reaching top speed of 173 km/h, After this, the locomotive was issued with temporary certification to work passenger trains on Polish railway network at speeds up to 160 km/h, and goods trains at speeds up to 140 km/h. In order to become permanently certified for operation, the locomotive had to be tested by railway operators. On 11 January 2013 the locomotive began test service with Lotos Kolej, and later also with PKP Intercity, Pol-Miedz Trans and Orlen KolTrans. After the test service was successfully concluded, the RTO has issued the final, permanent certificate for the 111Ed (with variants 111E, 111Eb, 111Ec) locomotive on 10 July 2014.

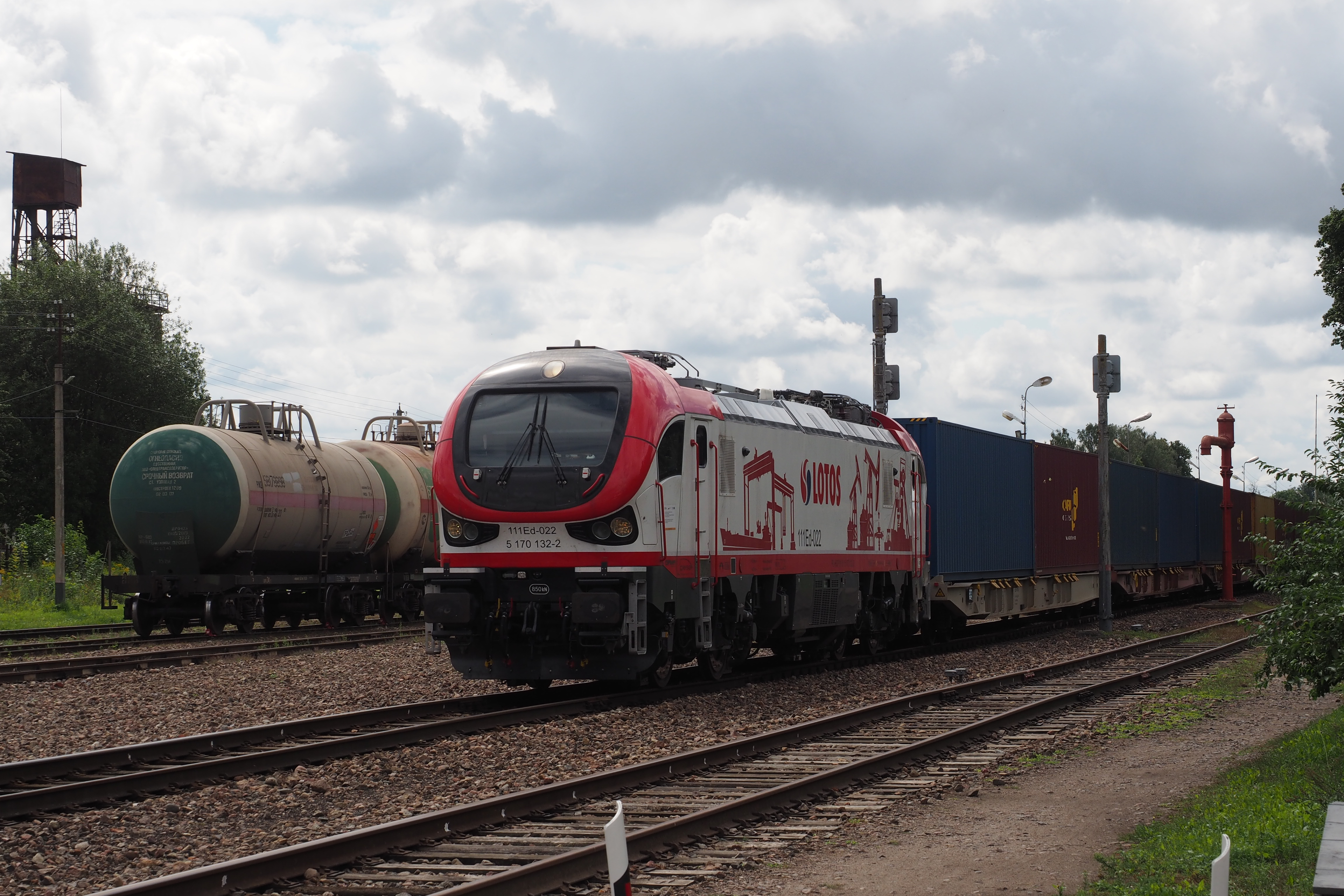
Electric locomotive 111Ed-022 equipped with a diesel last mile generator in Kaliningrad oblast (2021)

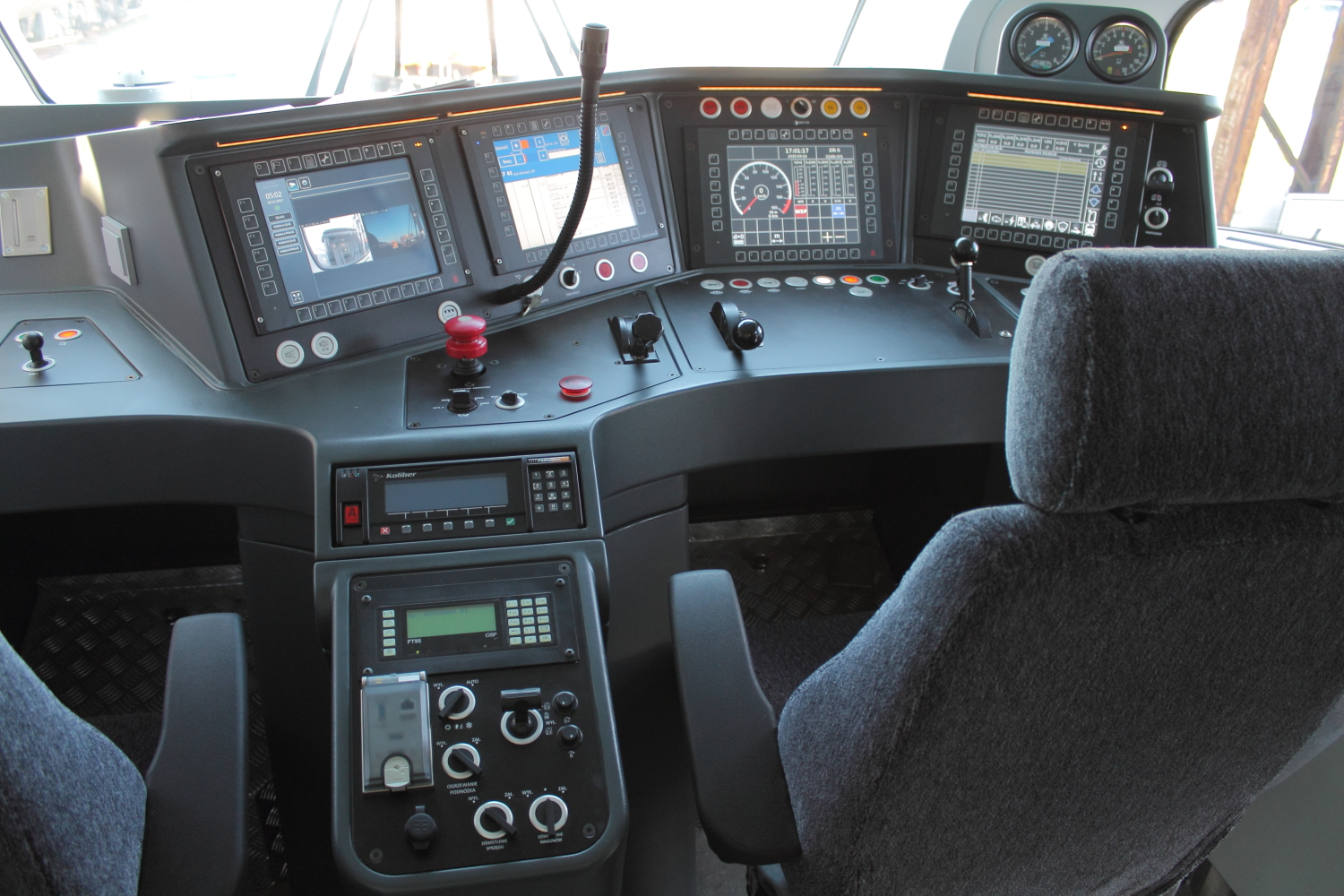
Driver's cab of 111Eb

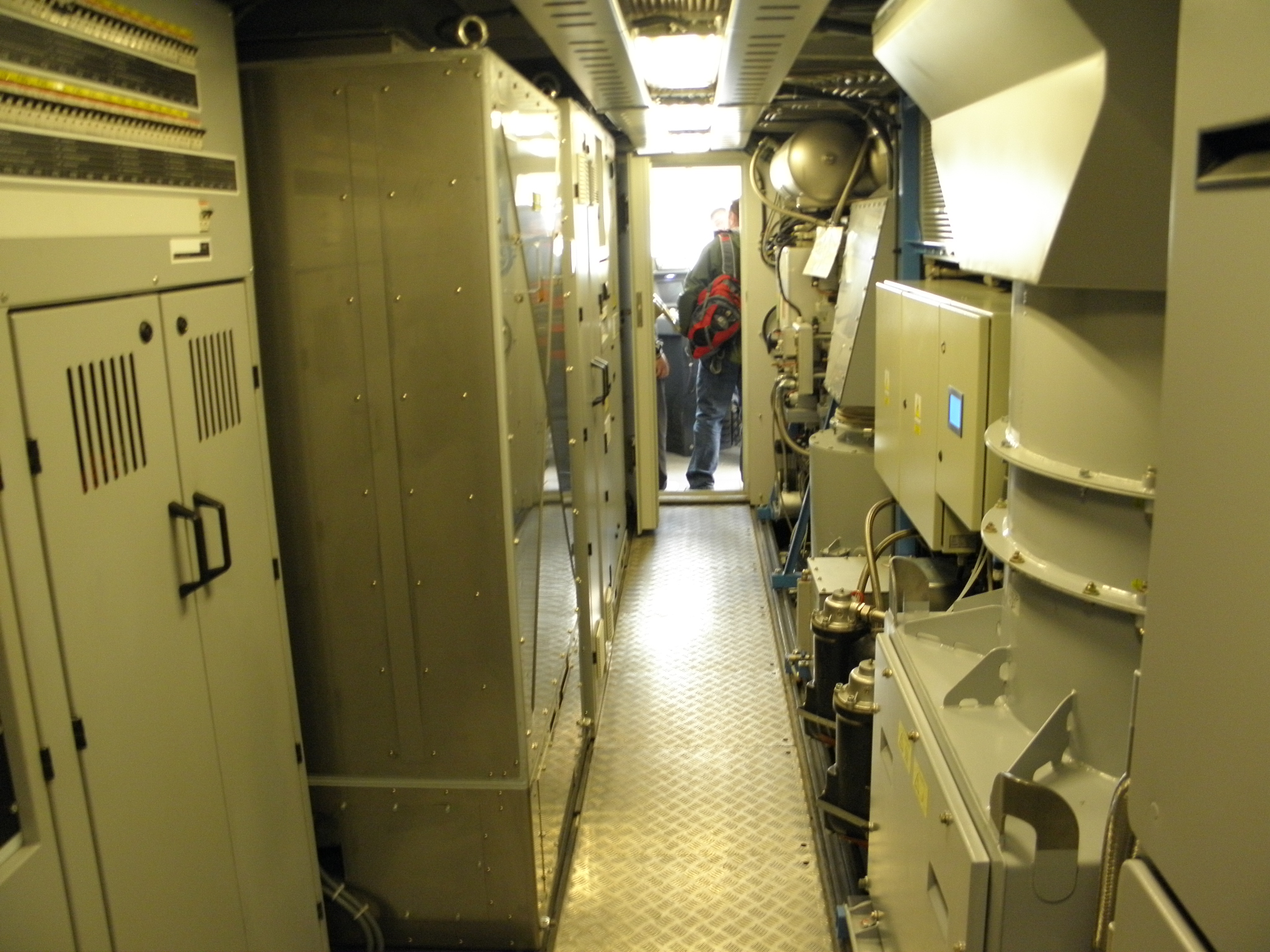
Machine room of 111Ed

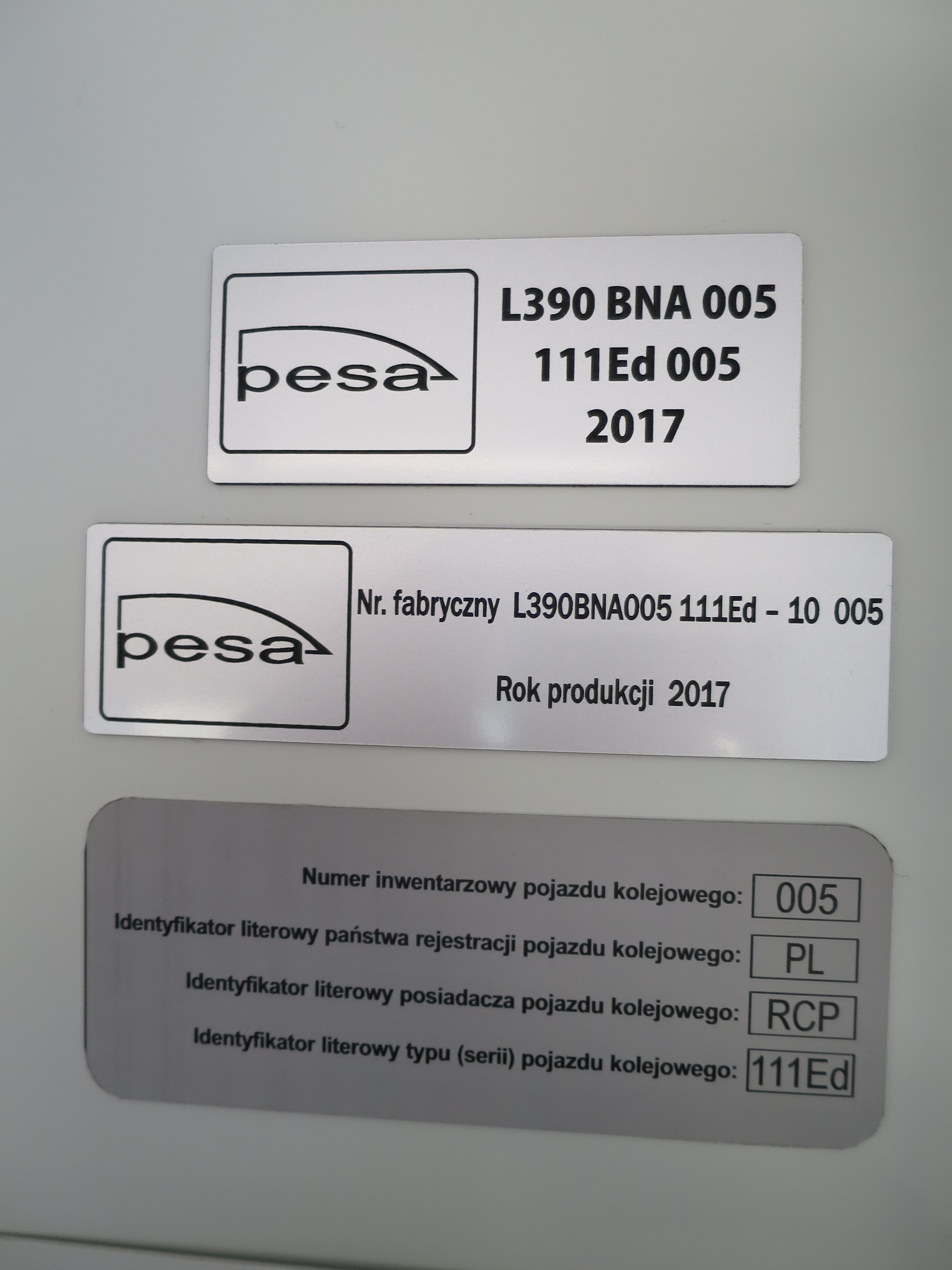
Builder's plate of 111Ed-005

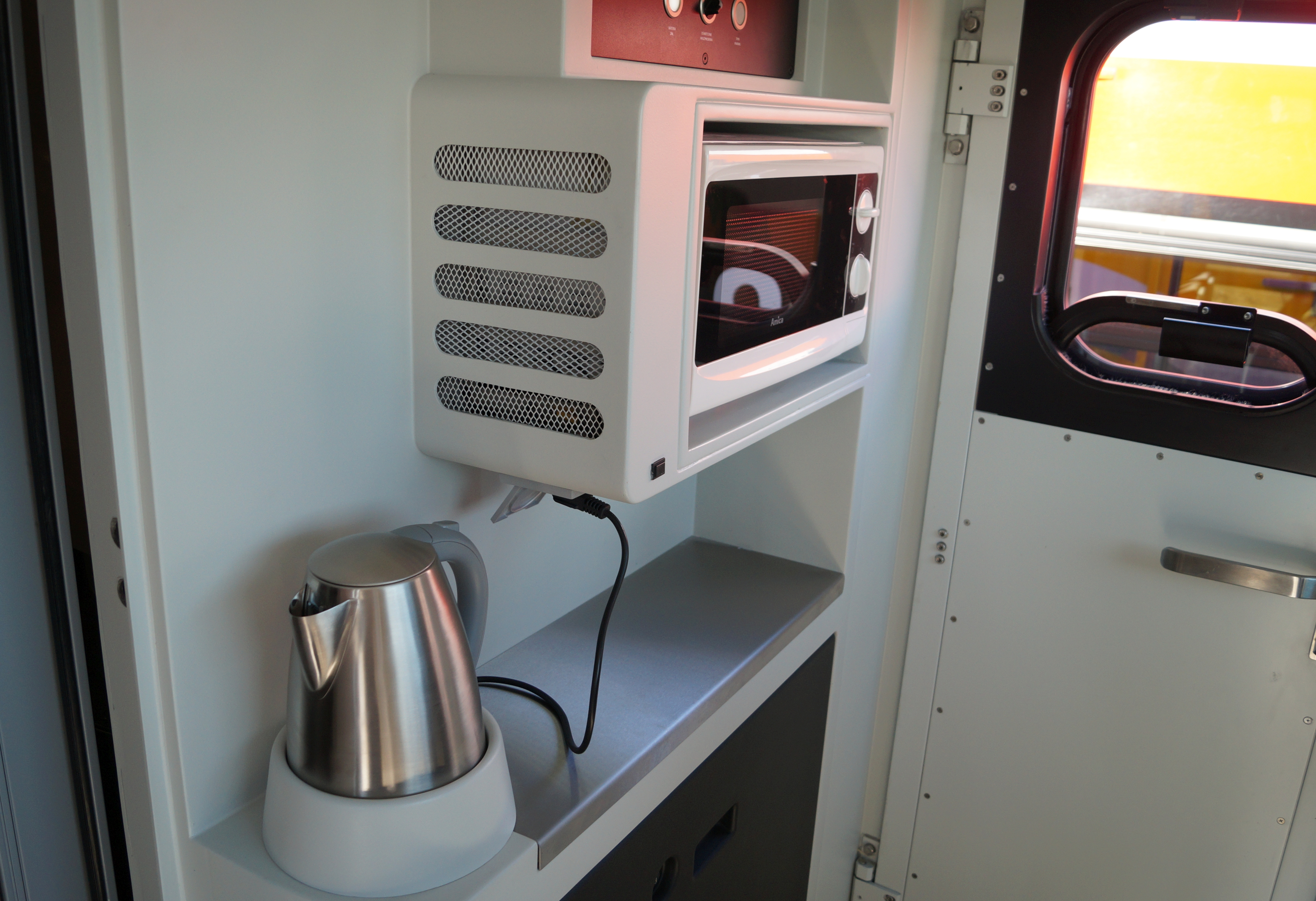
Break room of 111Eb

=== Diesel-powered Gama ===
In July 2014, the company built the first diesel-powered Gama, presented in September at InnoTrans. In mid-October, the locomotive began to be tested by IPS Tabor on the Rokietnica – Szamotuły railway line. Since then, PKP Intercity has ordered 10 units.

=== Full dual-mode Gama ===
As of 2021, Pesa, together with IPS Tabor, works on a bi-mode Gama (111DE) with a more powerful diesel engine that would enable it to be used as a mainline locomotive on both electrified and unelectrified railway lines.

=== PKP Intercity ===
Polish long-distance passenger transport company PKP Intercity has taken delivery of 10 diesel locomotives (111Db), They have been classified as SU160.
