= Pszczyna railway station =

Railway station in Silesia, Poland

Pszczyna
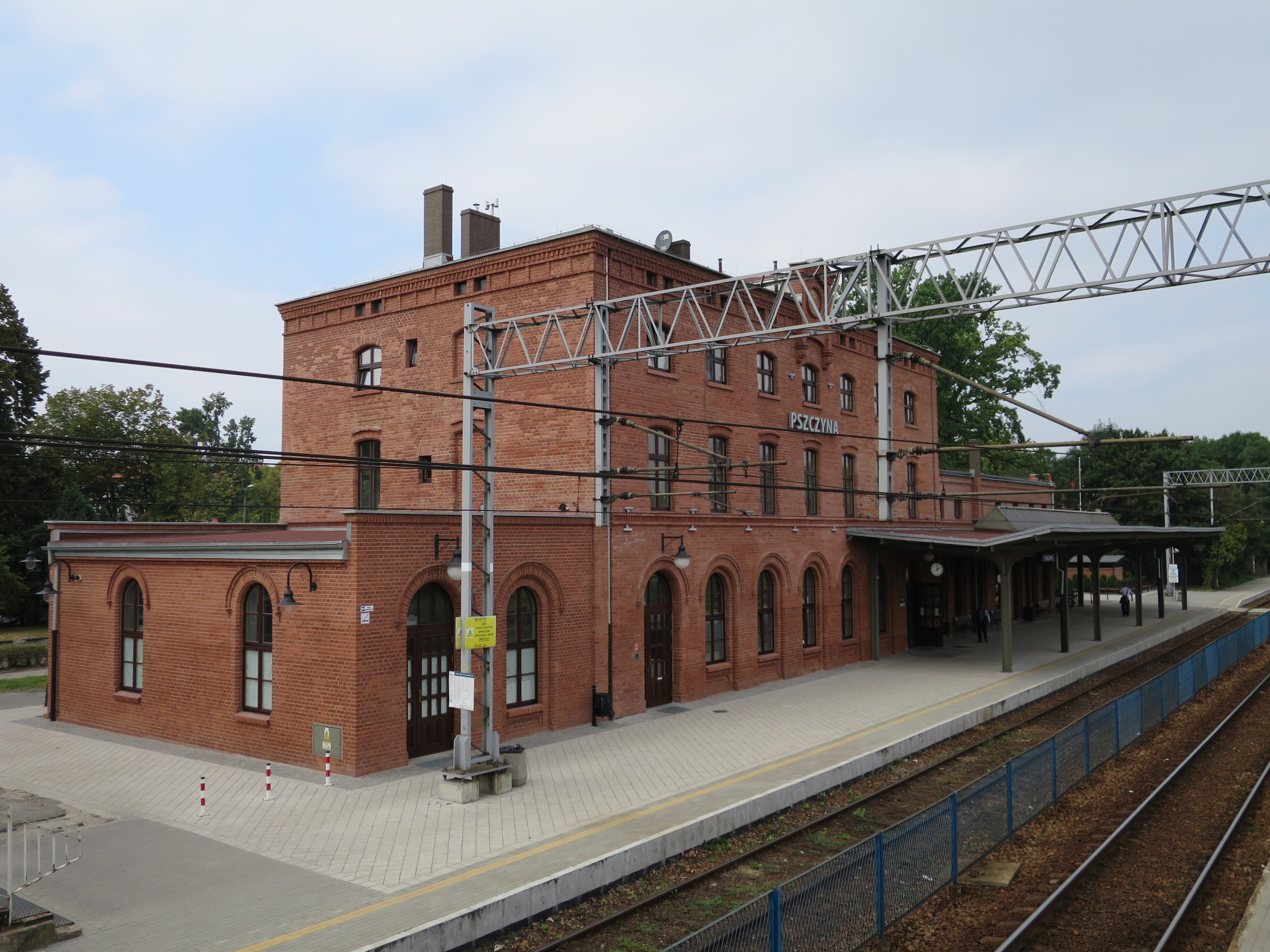

General information
- Location: Pszczyna, Silesia; Poland
- Coordinates: 49°58′31″N 18°57′11″E
- Owner: Polskie Koleje Państwowe S.A.
- Lines: 139: Katowice – Zwardoń; 148: Pszczyna – Rybnik
- Platforms: 2
- Tracks: 3

Construction
- Structure type: Building: Yes

History
- Opened: 1868
- Former names: Pless 1868-1901 Pleß 1901-1922 Pleß 1939-1945
Location

Pszczyna railway station is a railway station in Pszczyna, Poland. As of 2012, it is served by Silesian Railways (Silesian Voivodeship Railways) and PKP Intercity (EIP, InterCity, and TLK services). The station was opened in 1868.

== Train services ==
The station is served by the following services:

- Express Intercity Premium services (EIP) Warsaw - Katowice - Bielsko-Biała
- Express Intercity Premium services (EIP) Gdynia - Warsaw - Katowice - Bielsko-Biała
- Intercity services (IC) Warszawa - Częstochowa - Katowice - Bielsko-Biała
- Intercity services (IC) Białystok - Warszawa - Częstochowa - Katowice - Bielsko-Biała
- Intercity services (IC) Olsztyn - Warszawa - Skierniewice - Częstochowa - Katowice - Bielsko-Biała
- Regional Service (KŚ) S5 Katowice - Pszczyna - Czechowice-Dziedzice - Bielsko-Biała Gł. - Żywiec - Zwardoń
- Regional services (KŚ) S51 Katowice - Pszczyna - Bielsko-Biała Gł - Żywiec - Nowy Targ - Zakopane
- Regional Service (KŚ) S6 Katowice - Pszczyna - Skoczów - Ustroń - Wisła Głębce
- Regional Service (KŚ) S72 Rybnik - Żory - Pszczyna

Preceding station	PKP Intercity	Following station
Tychy towards Warszawa Wschodnia	EIP	Czechowice-Dziedzice towards Bielsko-Biała Główna
Tychy towards Gdynia Główna	EIP	Czechowice-Dziedzice towards Bielsko-Biała Główna
Tychy towards Warszawa Wschodnia or Białystok	IC	Czechowice-Dziedzice towards Bielsko-Biała Główna
Czechowice-Dziedzice towards Bielsko-Biała Główna	IC	Tychy towards Olsztyn Główny
Preceding station	KŚ	Following station
Piasek towards Katowice	S5	Goczałkowice towards Zwardoń
Piasek towards Katowice	S51	Goczałkowice towards Zakopane
Tychy towards Katowice	S6	Goczałkowice towards Wisła Głębce
Pszczyna Czarków towards Rybnik	S72	Terminus
