= Czechowice-Dziedzice railway station =

Railway station in Silesia, Poland

Czechowice-Dziedzice
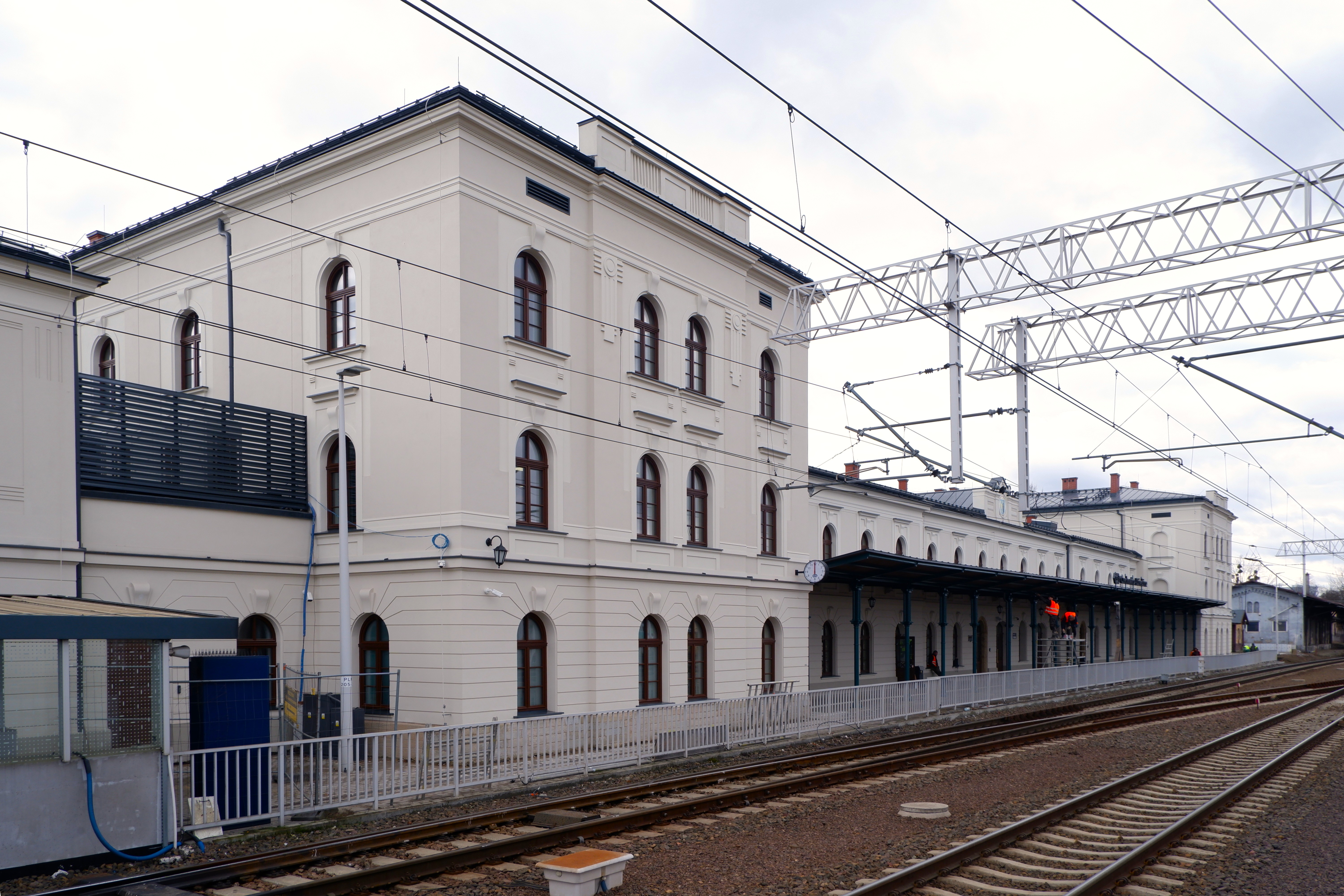
- View of the station

General information
- Location: Czechowice-Dziedzice, Silesia; Poland
- Coordinates: 49.9148543°N 19.0028932°E
- Owner: Polskie Koleje Państwowe S.A.
- Lines: 93: Trzebinia – Zebrzydowice; 139: Katowice – Zwardoń
- Platforms: 2
- Tracks: 4

Construction
- Structure type: Building: Yes

History
- Opened: 1855
- Former names: Dzieditz (1855-1921) Dziedzice (1921-1939); Dzieditz (1939-1945); Dziedzice (1945-1951) Czechowice Miasto (1951-1959)
Location

Czechowice-Dziedzice railway station is a railway station in Czechowice-Dziedzice (Silesian Voivodeship), Poland. As of 2026, it is served by Silesian Railways (Silesian Voivodeship Railways), Polregio and PKP Intercity (EIP, EIC, InterCity, and TLK services). It is also operated by a Czech-based operator, Leo Express.

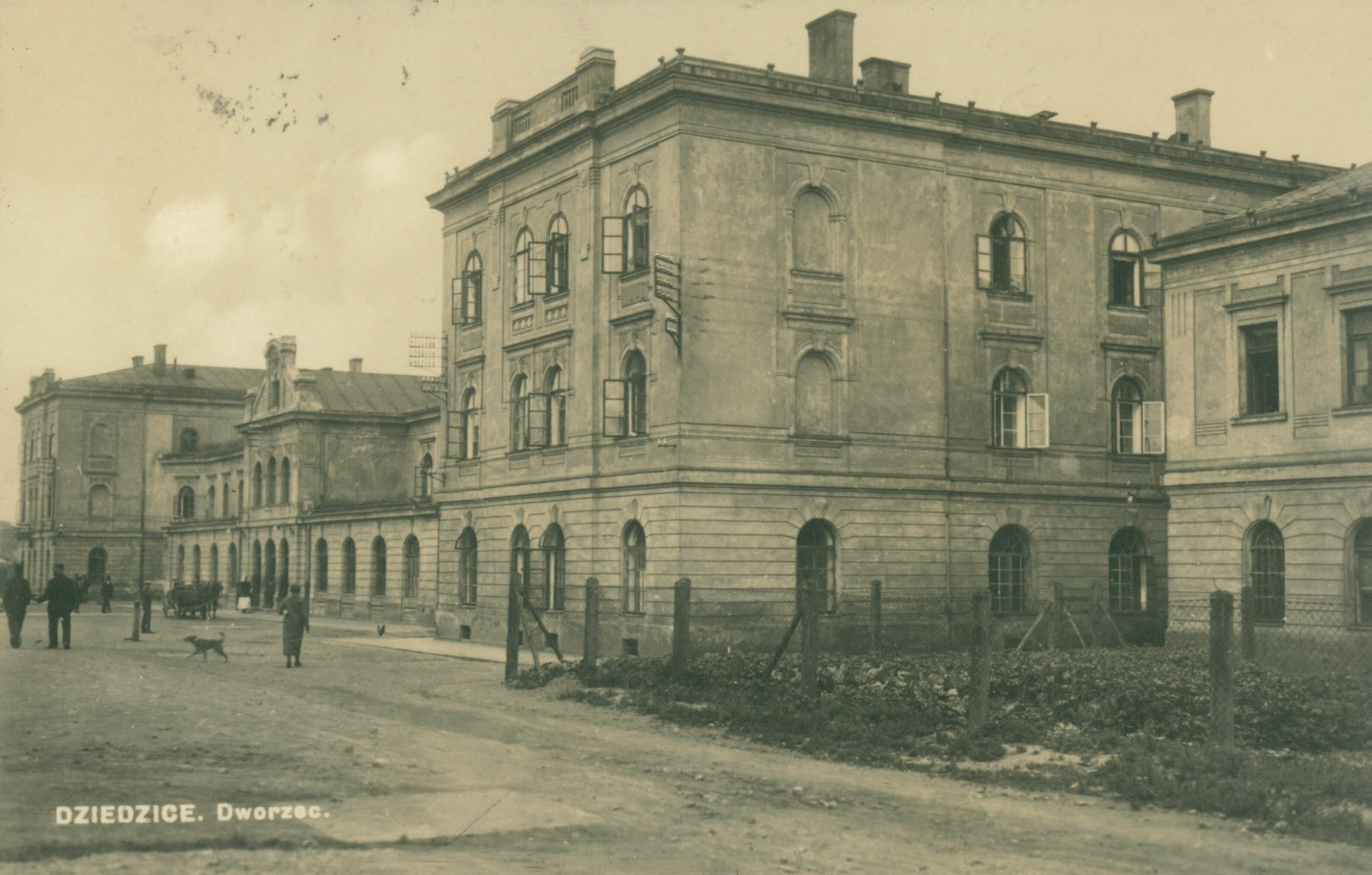
View of the station before 1939

== Train services ==
The station is served by the following services:

National services operated by PKP Intercity:

- EIP : Gdynia - Warsaw - Katowice - Bielsko-Biała
- EIP : Ustka - Gdynia - Warsaw - Katowice - Bielsko-Biała
- EIP : Warsaw - Katowice - Bielsko-Biała
- EIC Ondraszek: Warsaw - Katowice - Bielsko-Biała
- IC EC Comenius: Kraków - Trzebinia - Oświęcim - Zebrzydowice - Bohumin (Continuing as EC Silesia) - Ostrava - Olomouc - Prague
- IC EC Cracovia: Przemyśl - Rzeszów - Kraków - Trzebinia - Oświęcim - Czechowice-Dziedzice - Zebrzydowice - Bohumin - Ostrava - Olomouc - Prague
- IC EC Olza: Kraków - Trzebinia - Oświęcim - Zebrzydowice - Bohumin
- IC EC Prater: Vienna - Břeclav - Ostrava - Bohumin - Zebrzydowice - Czechowice-Dziedzice - Oświęcim - Trzebinia - Kraków
- IC EC Danubius: Vienna - Břeclav - Ostrava - Bohumin - Zebrzydowice - Czechowice-Dziedzice - Oświęcim - Trzebinia - Kraków
- IC EC Porta Moravica: Graz - Vienna - Břeclav - Ostrava - Bohumin - Zebrzydowice - Czechowice-Dziedzice - Oświęcim - Trzebinia - Kraków
- IC Pilecki: Warsaw - Częstochowa - Dąbrowa Górnicza - Tychy - Bielsko-Biała - Żywiec
- IC Żylica: Kraków - Trzebinia - Oświęcim - Czechowice-Dziedzice - Bielsko-Biała
- IC Dębowiec: Kraków - Trzebinia - Oświęcim - Czechowice-Dziedzice - Bielsko-Biała
- IC Baltazar: Kraków - Trzebinia - Oświęcim - Czechowice-Dziedzice - Bielsko-Biała
- IC Błatnia: Kraków - Trzebinia - Oświęcim - Czechowice-Dziedzice - Bielsko-Biała
- IC Heweliusz: Bielsko-Biała - Opole - Wrocław - Poznań - Bydgoszcz - Gdańsk - Gdynia
- IC Hutnik: Bielsko-Biała - Tychy - Katowice - Dąbrowa Górnicza - Częstochowa - Łódź - Toruń - Bydgoszcz - Gdańsk - Gdynia
- IC Heweliusz: Bielsko-Biała - Opole - Wrocław - Poznań - Bydgoszcz - Gdańsk - Gdynia - Hel
- IC Halny: Zakopane - Nowy Targ - Wadowice - Bielsko-Biała - Opole - Wrocław - Poznań
- TLK Planty: Kraków - Oświęcim - Opole - Wrocław
- TLK Pirat: Bielsko-Biała - Opole - Wrocław - (Poznań - Piła - Kołobrzeg)/((as TLK Wolin) Zielona Góra - Szczecin - Świnoujście)

Local services operated by Silesian Railways:

- S5 : Katowice - Pszczyna - Czechowice-Dziedzice - Bielsko-Biała - Żywiec - Zwardoń
- S51 : Częstochowa - Katowice - Pszczyna - Bielsko-Biała - Nowy Targ - Zakopane
- S61 : Czechowice-Dziedzice - Chybie - Zebrzydowice - Cieszyn
- S75 : Rybnik - Żory - Czechowice-Dziedzice - Bielsko-Biała - Żywiec - Zwardoń
- S6 (variants): Katowice - Mysłowice - Oświęcim - Czechowice-Dziedzice - Skoczów - Ustroń - Wisła

Regional services operated by Polregio:

- K32 : Kraków Gł. - Trzebinia - Oświęcim - Czechowice-Dziedzice

Preceding station	PKP Intercity	Following station
Pszczyna towards Gdynia Główna	EIP	Bielsko-Biała Główna Terminus
Pszczyna towards Warszawa Wschodnia	EIP	Bielsko-Biała Główna Terminus
Pszczyna towards Gdynia Główna	EIC	Bielsko-Biała Główna Terminus
Pszczyna towards Warszawa Wschodnia	EIC	Bielsko-Biała Główna Terminus
Oświęcim towards Warszawa Wschodnia	IC	Zebrzydowice towards München Hauptbahnhof
Pszczyna towards Gdynia Główna	IC	Bielsko-Biała Główna Terminus
Pszczyna towards Warszawa Wschodnia	IC	Bielsko-Biała Główna Terminus
Preceding station	KŚ	Following station
Goczałkowice-Zdrój towards Katowice	S5	Czechowice-Dziedzice Przystanek towards Zwardoń
Goczałkowice-Zdrój towards Katowice	S51	Czechowice-Dziedzice Przystanek towards Zakopane
Terminus	S61	Zabrzeg towards Cieszyn
Chybie towards Gliwice	S75	Bielsko-Biała Główna towards Zwardoń
Preceding station	Polregio	Following station
Terminus	K32	Kaniów towards Kraków Główny
