= Bielsko-Biała Główna railway station =

Railway station in Silesia, Poland

Bielsko-Biała Główna
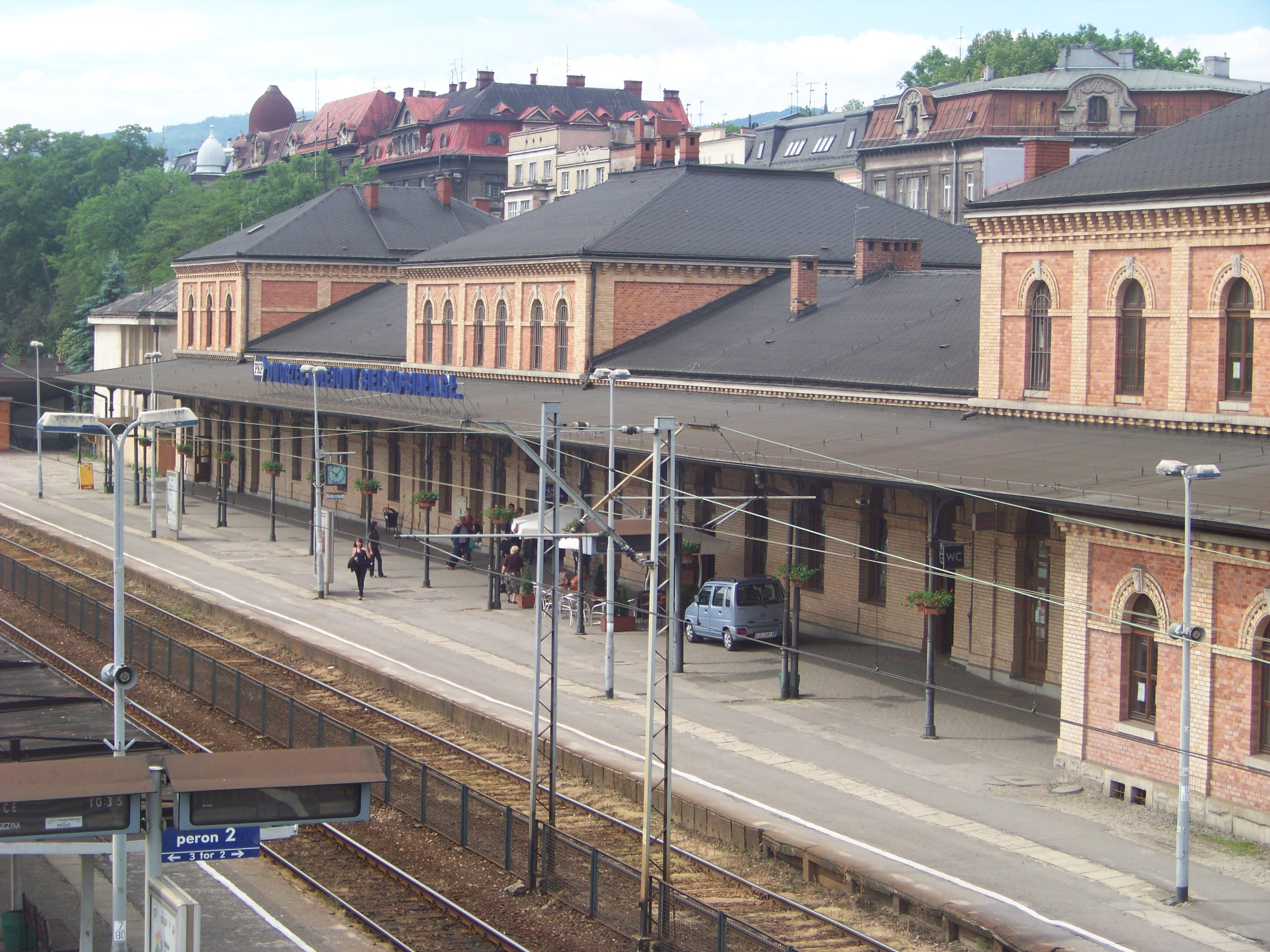

General information
- Location: Bielsko-Biała, Silesia; Poland
- Coordinates: 49.8297433°N 19.044846°E
- Owner: Polskie Koleje Państwowe S.A.
- Lines: 117: Kalwaria Zebrzydowska Lanckorona – Bielsko-Biała Główna; 139: Katowice – Zwardoń; 190: Bielsko-Biała Główna – Cieszyn
- Platforms: 3
- Tracks: 6

History
- Opened: 1855
- Former names: Bielitz (1855–1921) Bielsko (1921–1939); Bielitz (1939–1943); Bielitz Hauptbahnhof (1943–1945); Bielsko (1945–1956) Bielsko Biała Główna (1956–2015)
Location

Bielsko-Biała Główna railway station is a railway station in Bielsko-Biała (Silesian Voivodeship), Poland. As of 2022, it is served by Polregio (local and InterRegio services), Silesian Railways (local services) and PKP Intercity (EIP, InterCity, and TLK services). The station serves as a southern terminus of Express Intercity Premium (EIP) services, the highest speed rail services in Poland, connecting to Warsaw, as well as to Gdańsk-Gdynia.

== Train services ==
The station is served by the following services:

- Express Intercity Premium services (EIP) Warsaw - Katowice - Bielsko-Biała
- Express Intercity Premium services (EIP) Gdynia - Warsaw - Katowice - Bielsko-Biała
- Intercity services (IC) Warszawa - Częstochowa - Katowice - Bielsko-Biała
- Intercity services (IC) Białystok - Warszawa - Częstochowa - Katowice - Bielsko-Biała
- Intercity services (IC) Olsztyn - Warszawa - Skierniewice - Częstochowa - Katowice - Bielsko-Biała
- Intercity services (IC) Ustka - Koszalin - Poznań - Wrocław - Opole - Bielsko-Biała
- Intercity services (IC) Bydgoszcz - Poznań - Leszno - Wrocław - Opole - Rybnik - Bielsko-Biała - Zakopane
- Regional service (PR) Bielsko-Biała Główna — Wadowice
- Regional service (PR) Bielsko-Biała Główna — Wadowice - Kraków Główny
- Regional Service (KŚ) S5 Katowice - Pszczyna - Czechowice-Dziedzice - Bielsko-Biała Gł. - Żywiec - Zwardoń
- Regional services (KŚ) S51 Katowice - Pszczyna - Bielsko-Biała Gł - Żywiec - Nowy Targ - Zakopane
- Regional services (KŚ) S75 Rybnik - Żory - Czechowice-Dziedzice - Bielsko-Biała Gł - Żywiec

Preceding station	PKP Intercity	Following station
Czechowice-Dziedzice towards Warszawa Wschodnia	EIP	Terminus
Czechowice-Dziedzice towards Gdynia Główna	EIP	Terminus
Czechowice-Dziedzice towards Warszawa Wschodnia or Białystok	IC	Terminus
Terminus	IC	Czechowice-Dziedzice towards Olsztyn Główny
Czechowice-Dziedzice towards Ustka	IC	Terminus
Czechowice-Dziedzice towards Bydgoszcz Główna	IC	Żywiec towards Zakopane
Preceding station	Polregio	Following station
Terminus	PR	Bielsko-Biała Wschód towards Wadowice or Kraków Główny
Preceding station	KŚ	Following station
Bielsko-Biała Północ towards Katowice	S5	Bielsko-Biała Lipnik towards Zwardoń
Bielsko-Biała Północ towards Katowice	S51	Bielsko-Biała Lipnik towards Zakopane
Czechowice-Dziedzice towards Gliwice	S75	Bielsko-Biała Lipnik towards Zwardoń
