= PKP Intercity =

Polish transportation subsidiary

- Type: JSC
- Industry: Rail transport
- Founded: 1 September 2001
- Headquarters: Warsaw, Poland
- Key people: Janusz Malinowski; CEO; Dariusz Grajda; Chairman of the supervisory board
- Products: Express Intercity Premium (EIP); Express Intercity (EIC); Intercity (IC); Twoje Linie Kolejowe (TLK)
- Services: Long-range and international passenger transport
- Revenue: 2,950.5 million zł ▲ (2019)
- Operating income: 186.4 million zł ▼ (2019)
- Net income: 141.1 million zł ▼ (2019)
- Total assets: 5,992.6 million zł ▲ (2019)
- Number of employees: 8,936
- Website: Official website

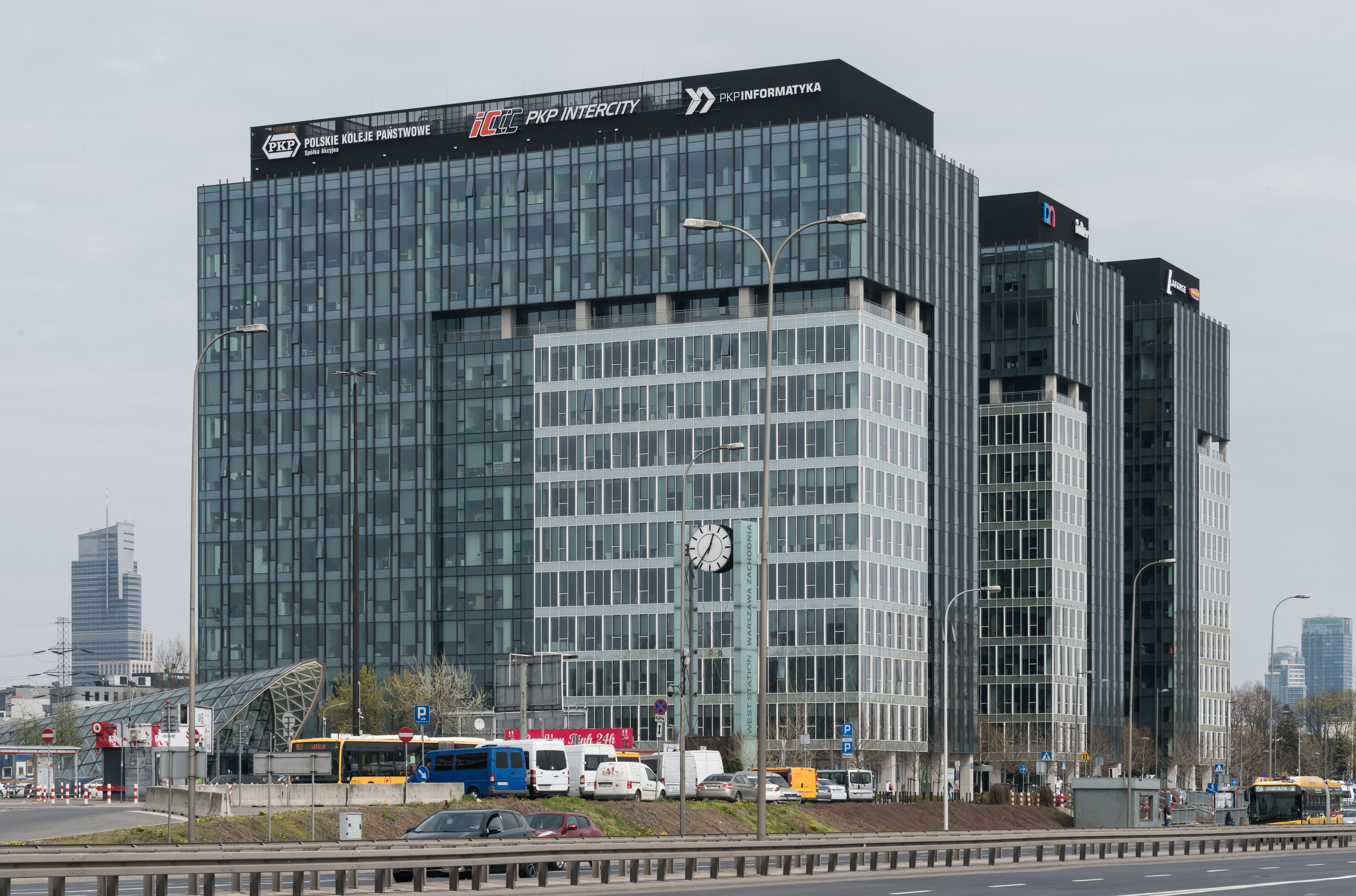
PKP Intercity HQ in West station Building, Warsaw

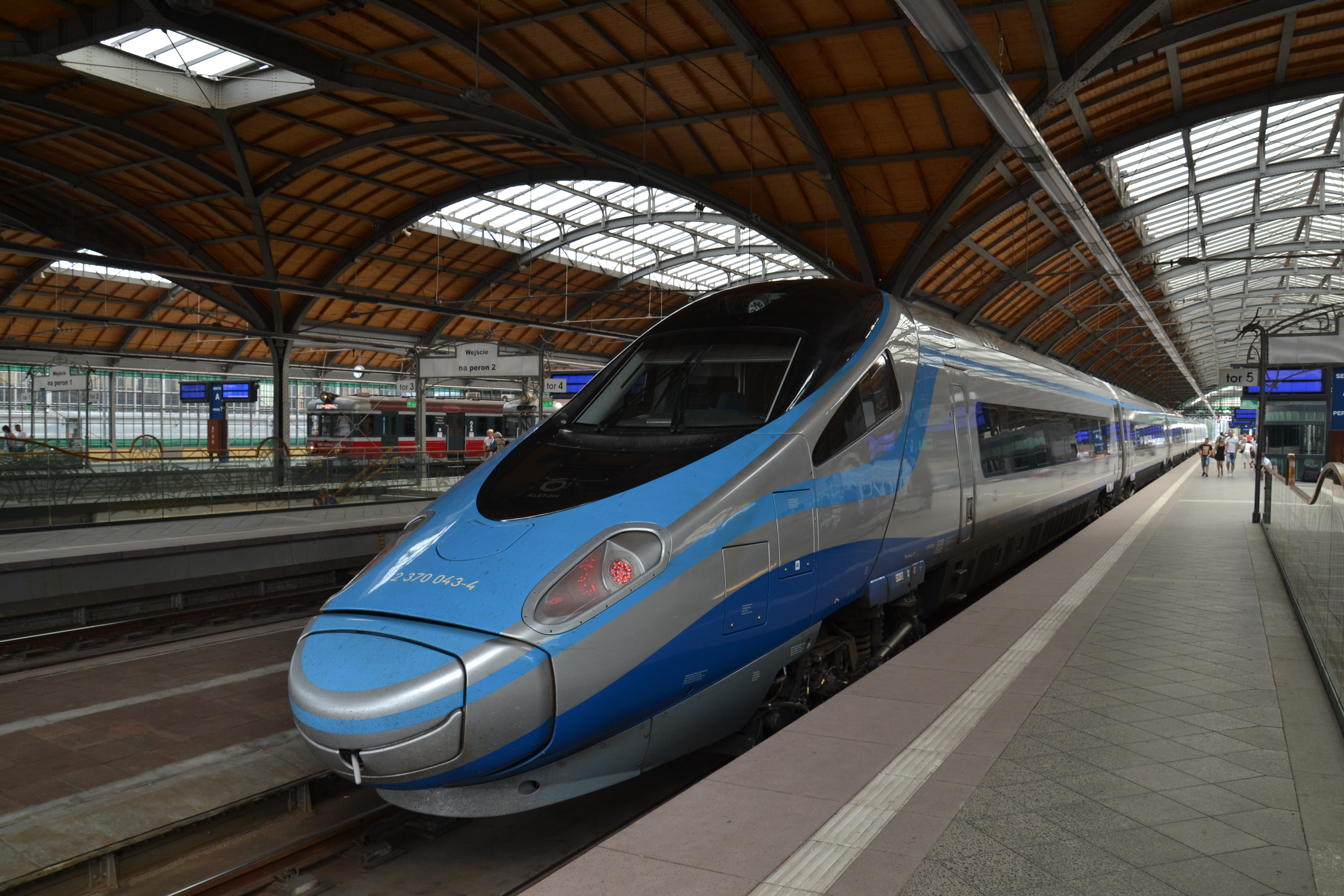
A PKP Intercity ED250 Pendolino at Wrocław Main station

PKP Intercity is the subsidiary of the PKP Group responsible for long-distance rail passenger transport in Poland. It operates around 350 trains daily, connecting large agglomerations and smaller towns in Poland. It offers its services under TLK, InterCity, Express Intercity and Express Intercity Premium brands. The company also provides most international rail connections to and from the country. In 2023, the company reported an 18.2% of market share in terms of total number of served passengers in the country.

== History ==
PKP Intercity came into existence as a result of a major restructuring of the state-owned Polish railway operator Polish State Railways (PKP) which, in 2001, was divided up into several different companies that were operated as independent entities on a commercial basis. This restructuring was aimed at separating railway operating activities from the management of Poland's railway infrastructure. PKP Intercity is a subsidiary of PKP Group, a state-owned holding company for various other railway-orientated subsidiaries.

PKP Intercity introduced a new standard of service in the Polish rail sector. Certain trains operated under the InterCity brand offer onboard snacks and most feature air conditioning. Over time, the range of services provided by PKP Intercity has expanded; in 2005, PKP Intercity launched the TLK (Lowcost Trains) brand, an alternative service level aimed at less affluent passengers.

In 2006, PKP Intercity inaugurated its first modern Customer Service Centre at Warsaw Central station; one year later, the second such facility was opened in Poznan. By the late 2000s, it operated the largest segment of passenger rail services in the country; in 2007, PKP Intercity transported 11.6 million passengers, up by almost one million from 10.7 million passengers in 2006. By 2007, it was drawing up plans to purchase new locomotives and to further upgrade existing rolling stock.

In May 2011, PKP Intercity awarded a contract valued at €665 million to the French rolling stock manufacturer Alstom covering the manufacture and supply of 20 ED250 New Pendolino high speed trains. It additionally covered the provision of all maintenance activities for up to 17 years and the construction of a new maintenance depot. These trainsets, each comprising seven cars, were built to PKP Intercity's individual specifications; whilst capable of attaining a maximum speed of 250 km/h, carrying up to 402 passengers, and incorporating various noise minimisation measures, they intentionally excluded the optional tilting mechanism.

On 17 November 2013, a new speed record for Polish railways was set when the Pendolino ED250 reached a speed of 291 km/h (181 mph). Furthermore, on 24 November 2013, the final day of tests on the CMK Central Rail Line, the Pendolino reached 293 km/h (182 mph). On 11 September 2014, Polands's Railway Transport Office (UTK) announced that the ED250 had been certified for operation at up to 250km/h in accordance with the relevant Technical Specifications for Interoperability (TSI). They are operated on existing conventional lines between major city groups such as Warsaw-Gdansk-Gdynia, Warsaw-Krakow, and Warsaw-Katowice, delivering significantly shortened journey times over traditional rolling stock, traversing the route between Warsaw and Gdansk in two and a half hours. In the 2020/21 timetable, ED250 routinely operated at a scheduled speed of up to 200 km/h (124 mph) along selected stretches of the Warszawa - Gdynia and Central Rail Line routes.

Various other schemes were underway during the late 2010s, such as the retrofitting of Wi-Fi apparatus throughout the various types of rolling stock to provide passengers with mobile internet access, having completed work on 171 PKP Intercity cars and 40 combined sets by August 2018. One year later, a contract valued at €247 million was issued by PKP Intercity to the Swiss rolling stock manufacturer Stadler Rail for the manufacture and delivery of 12 Stadler Flirt electric multiple units in an eight-car long configuration as well as a 15-year maintenance period; these feature both first class and second class compartments along with an onboard lounge bar area and accessibility adaptions for persons of reduced mobility.

In 2024, PKP Intercity signed a contract with H. Cegielski – FPS for the delivery of 300 modern railroad carriages. The contract with the Polish rolling stock manufacturer is worth PLN 4.2 billion (ca. EUR 1 billion). It also covers an option for the production of additional 150 carriages, which would increase the total value of the deal to PLN 6.35 billion (EUR 1.47 billion). The new carriages will be designed to reach the speeds of 200 km/h and are expected to be delivered in 2028. They will also be authorised for operation in Austria, Czech Republic, Germany, Hungary, Lithuania and Slovakia.

In July 2026, the operator announced that it had served over 44.7 million passengers in the first half of 2026; marking a significant increase from prior years. On average, 274 thousand passengers where served every day, making it a 45% increase from 2023, which was measured in the same time period (January–June).

On 12 October 2026, PKP Intercity announced its services would operate on fixed, numbered routes at regular intervals. In addition, for the first time, the operator had an official transit map. The new system is based on lines, each with a specific number, route, and frequency. For example, the "Ex" symbol indicates express services (EIP and EIC), followed by a number, such as 03, forming the Kraków to Tricity via Warsaw service. The new changes would ultimately make the "planning of passenger's journeys easier and ensure better coordination of interchanging between trains", said Rynek Kolejowy.

== Operations ==
The company runs the following train categories:

- Express InterCity Premium (EIP, EIC Premium) – domestic exclusive high-speed trains (ED250 New Pendolino) between major cities with obligatory reservation.
- Express InterCity (EIC) – high-standard express trains between major cities and popular tourist destinations:
- InterCity – affordable high-standard express trains and fast trains with obligatory reservation; higher standard and priority than TLK but the same fare. Exclusive high-standard express trains – Pesa Dart and Stadler Flirt also run under the InterCity brand.
  - EuroCity (EC) – international high-standard trains, reservation obligatory, on domestic routes runs under InterCity and Express InterCity brand,
  - EuroNight (EN) – international night trains with obligatory reservation.
- Twoje Linie Kolejowe (TLK, "Your Rail Lines"; formerly called Tanie Linie Kolejowe, "Cheap Rail Lines" from 2005 to 2011) – affordable fast trains with obligatory reservation (with some exceptions); lower standard than InterCity. Some overnight TLK trains such as Rozewie and Ustronie provide couchette and sleeper cars. A limited number of shorter-route TLK trains is 2nd-class only. Usually run by older locomotive-hauled rakes and more rarely Pesa Bydgostia EMUs or SN84 DMUs.
  - Międzynarodowy (M) – international fast train (lower standard than EuroCity)
  - Międzynarodowy nocny – international night train (lower standard than EuroNight)

== Rolling stock ==
=== Electric locomotives ===
Class	Number	Speed	Manufacturer	Modernized
EP05	1	160 km/h	Škoda	ZNTK Gdańsk
EU07	116	125 km/h	Pafawag / HCP	
EP07	116	125 km/h	Pafawag / HCP	ZNTKiM
EU07A	3	160 km/h	HCP	ZNTK Oleśnica/Olkol
EP08	9	140 km/h	Pafawag	
EP09	41	160 km/h	Pafawag	
EU44	10	230 km/h	Siemens	
EU160	96	160 km/h	Newag	
EU200	21 out of 110	200 km/h	Newag	

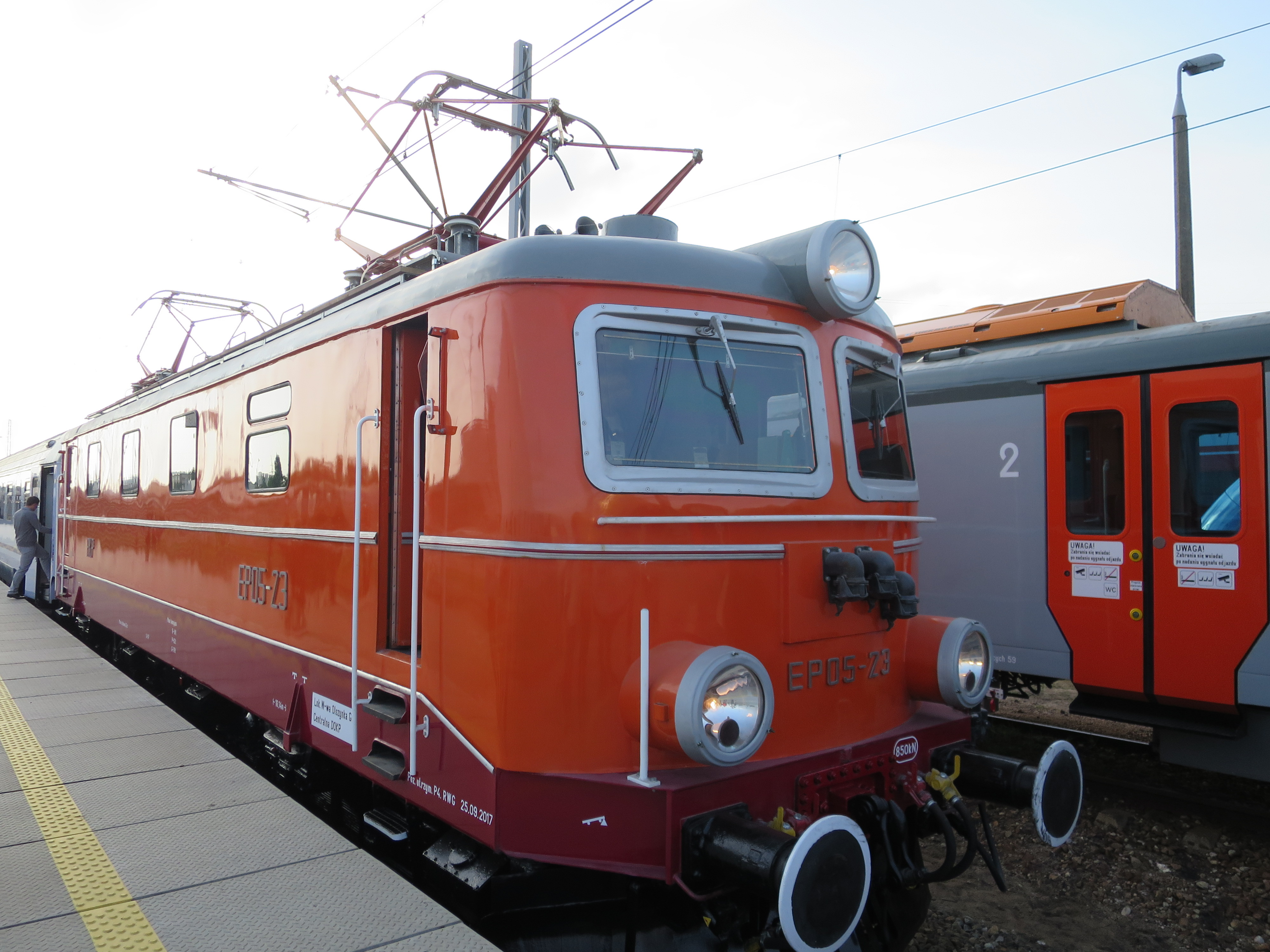
EP05

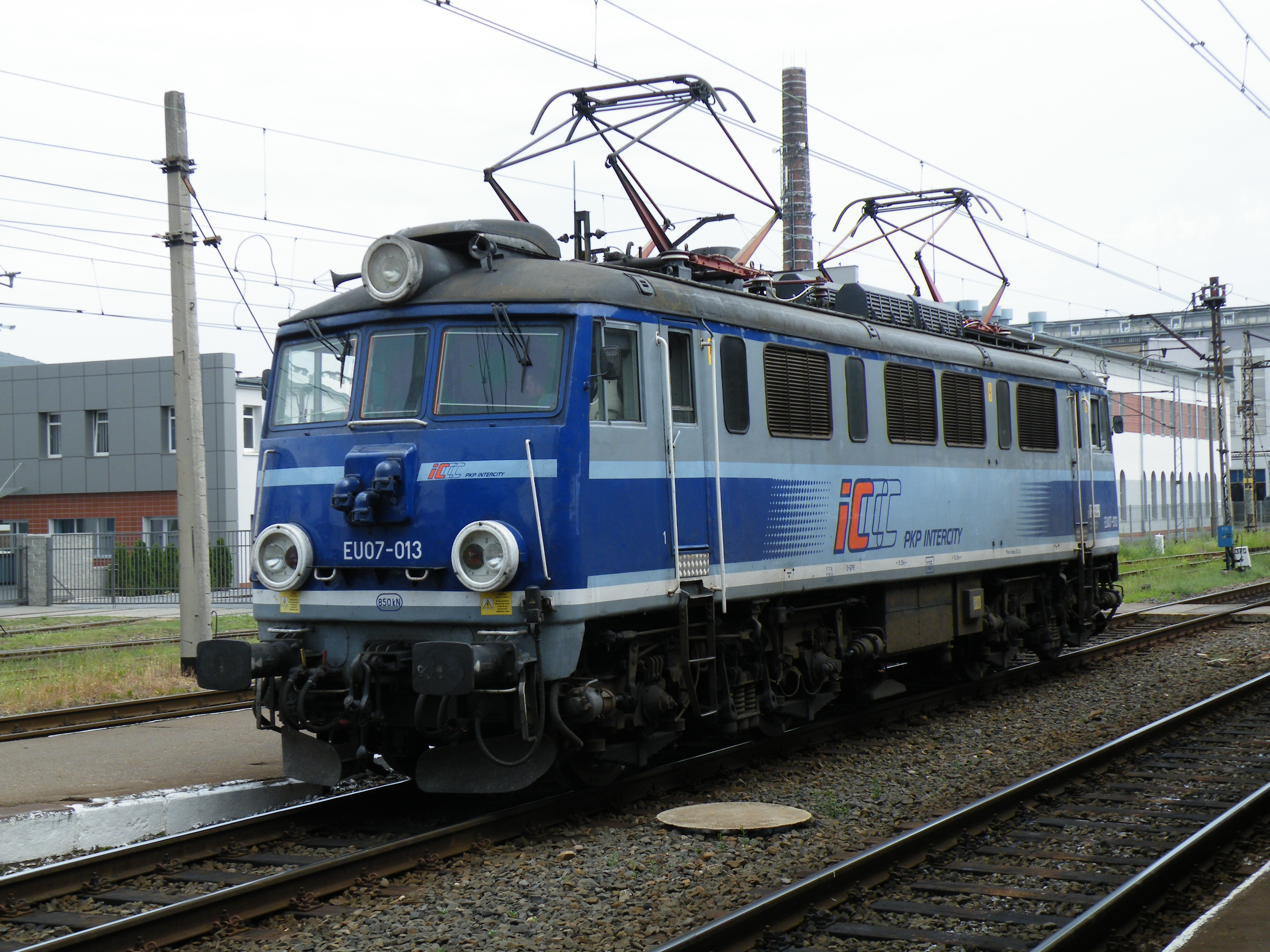
EU07

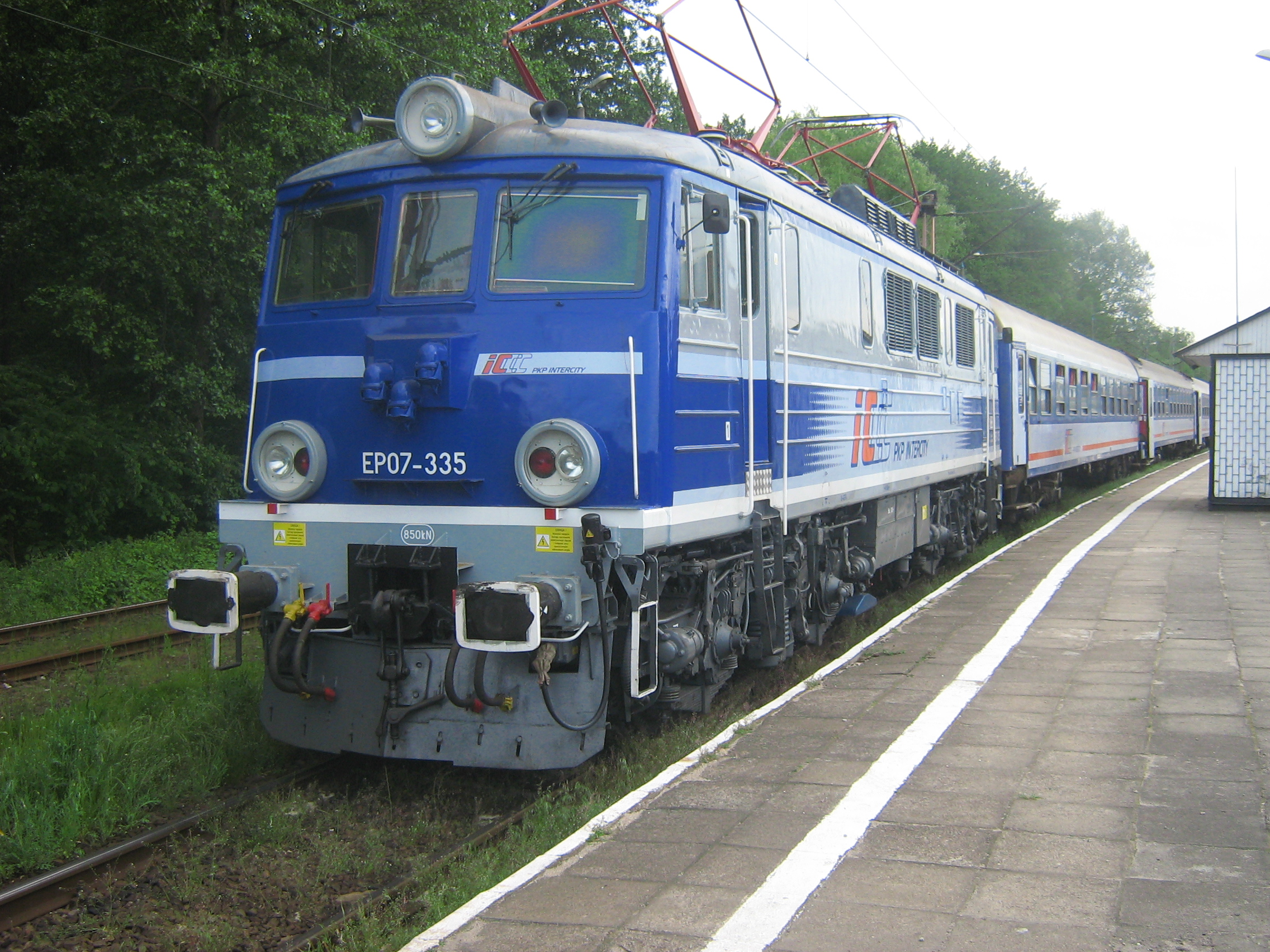
EP07

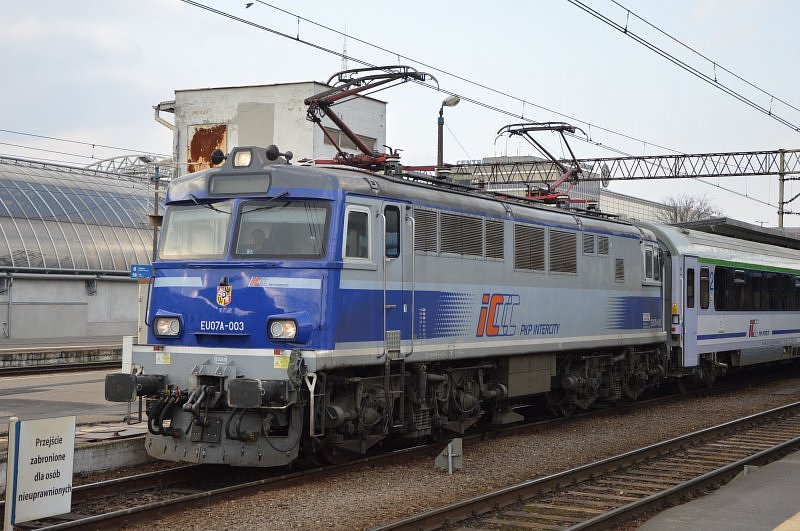
EU07A

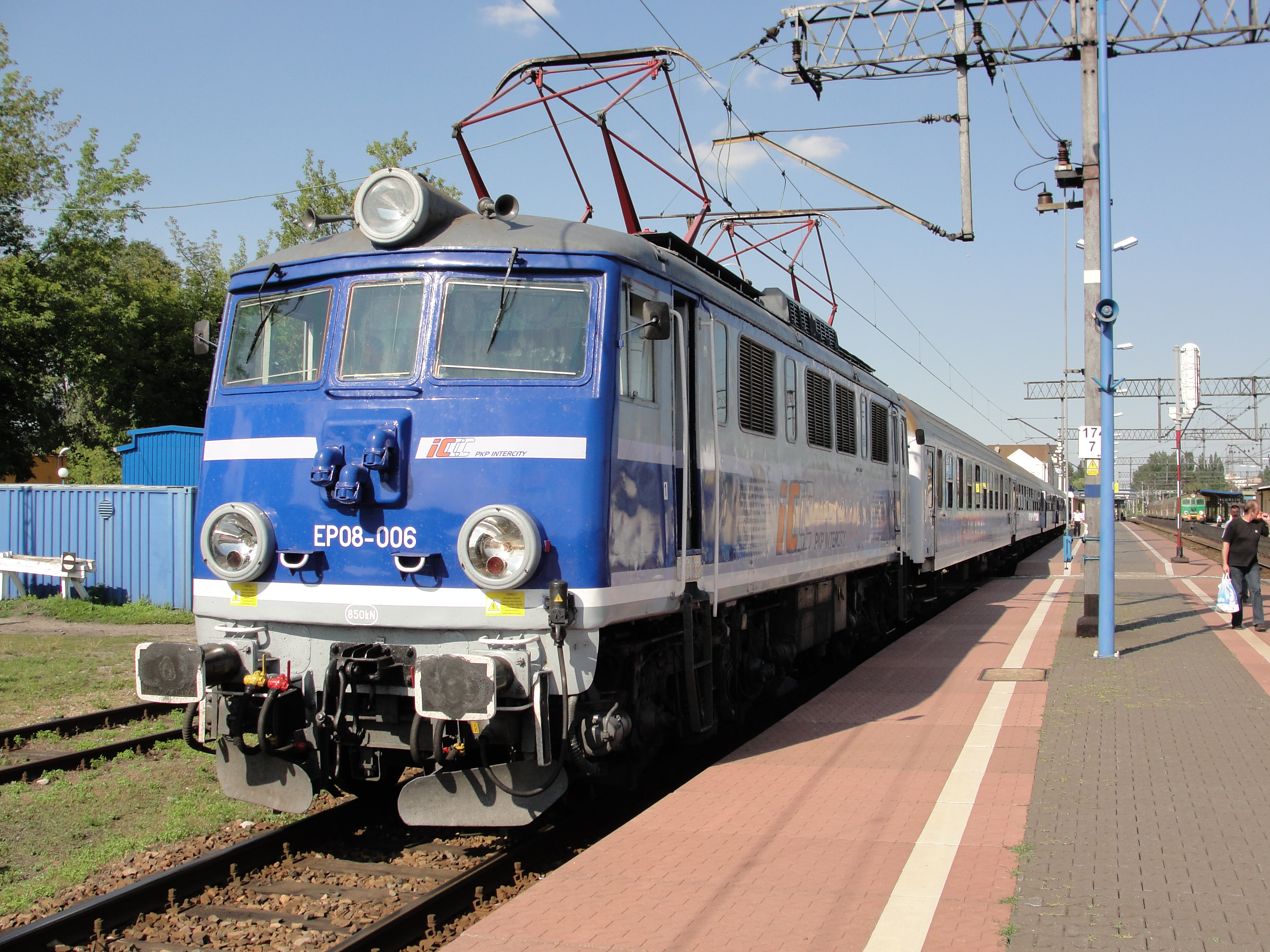
EP08

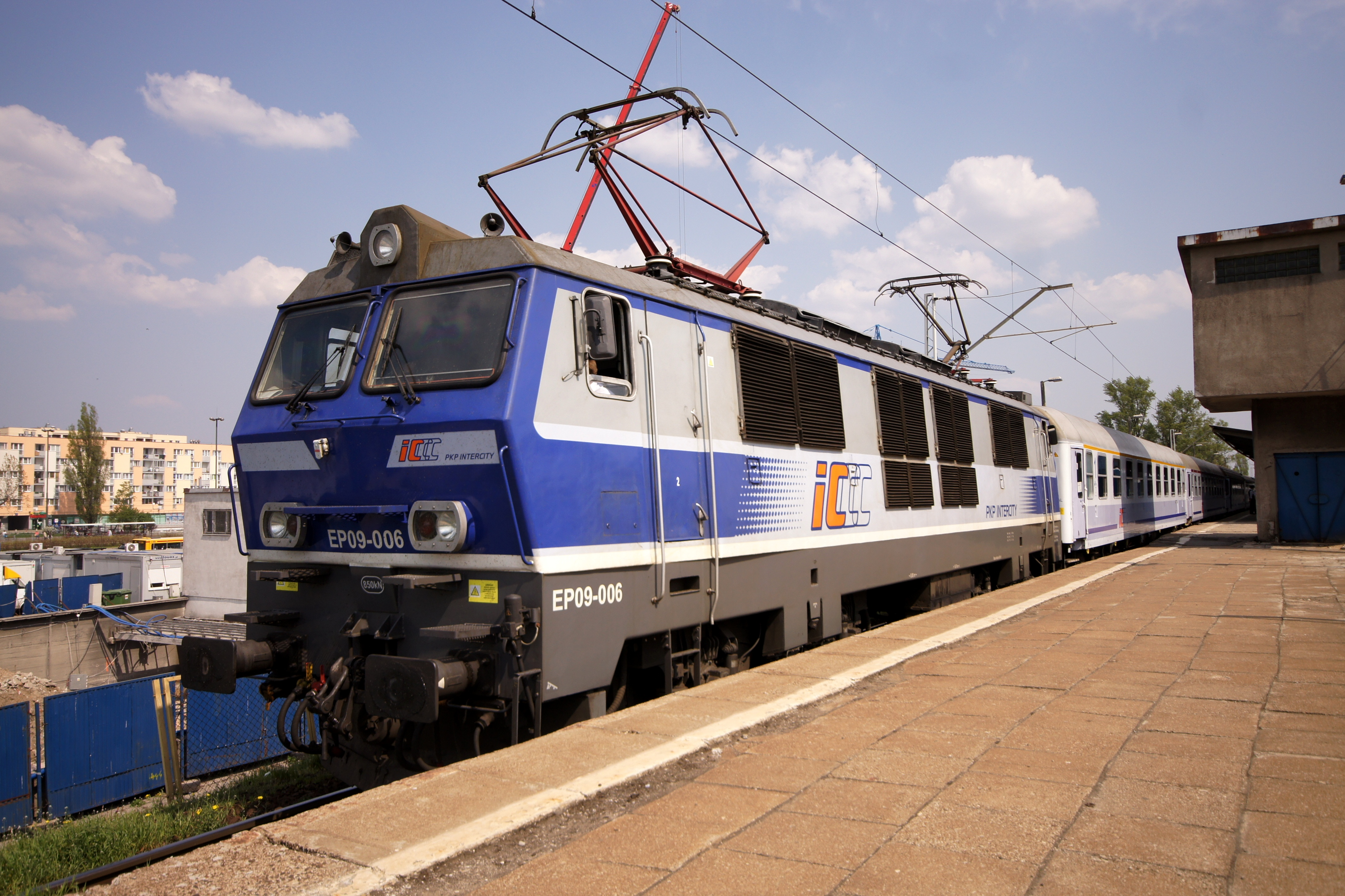
EP09

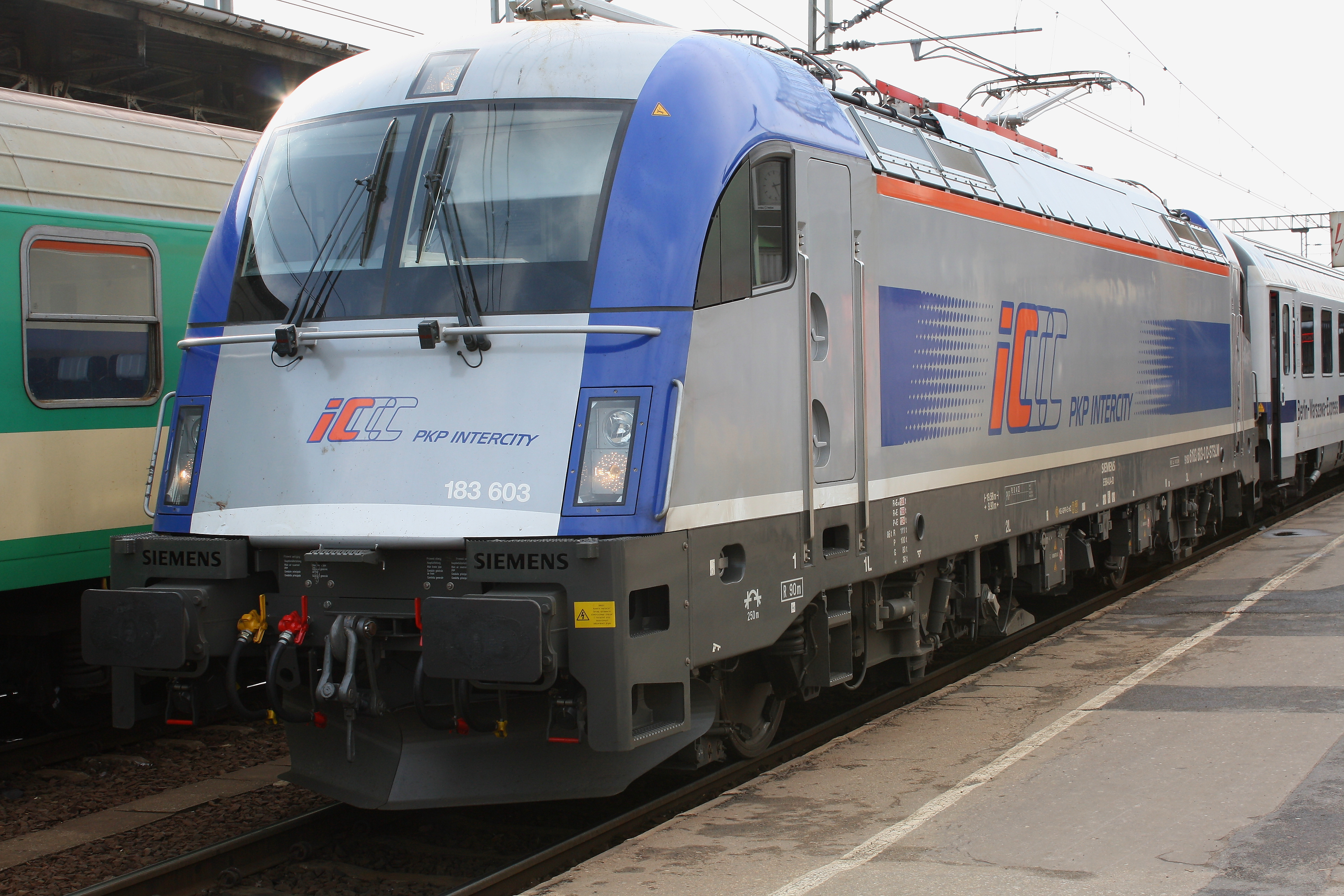
EU44 Husarz

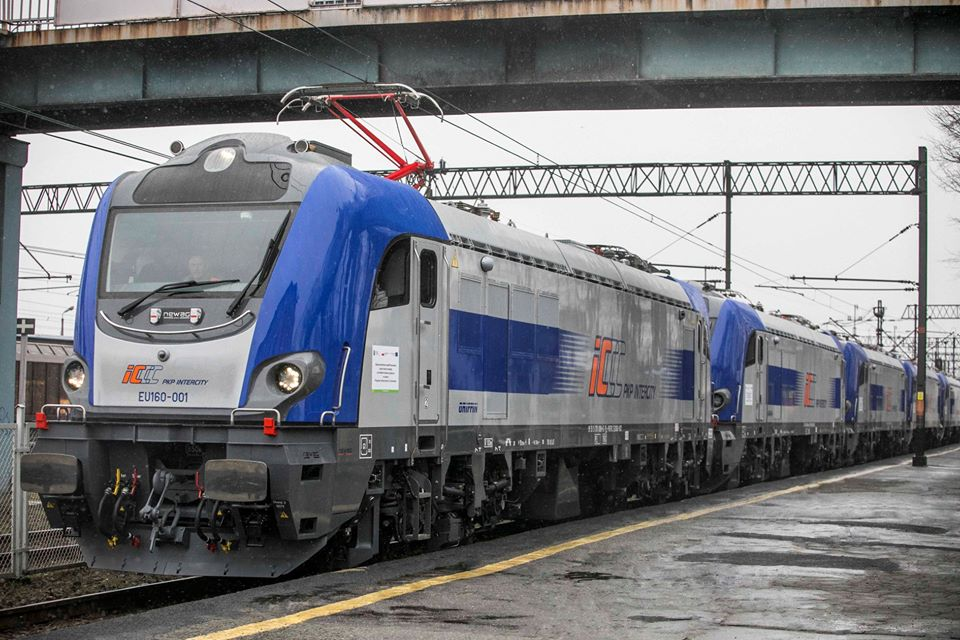
EU160 Griffin

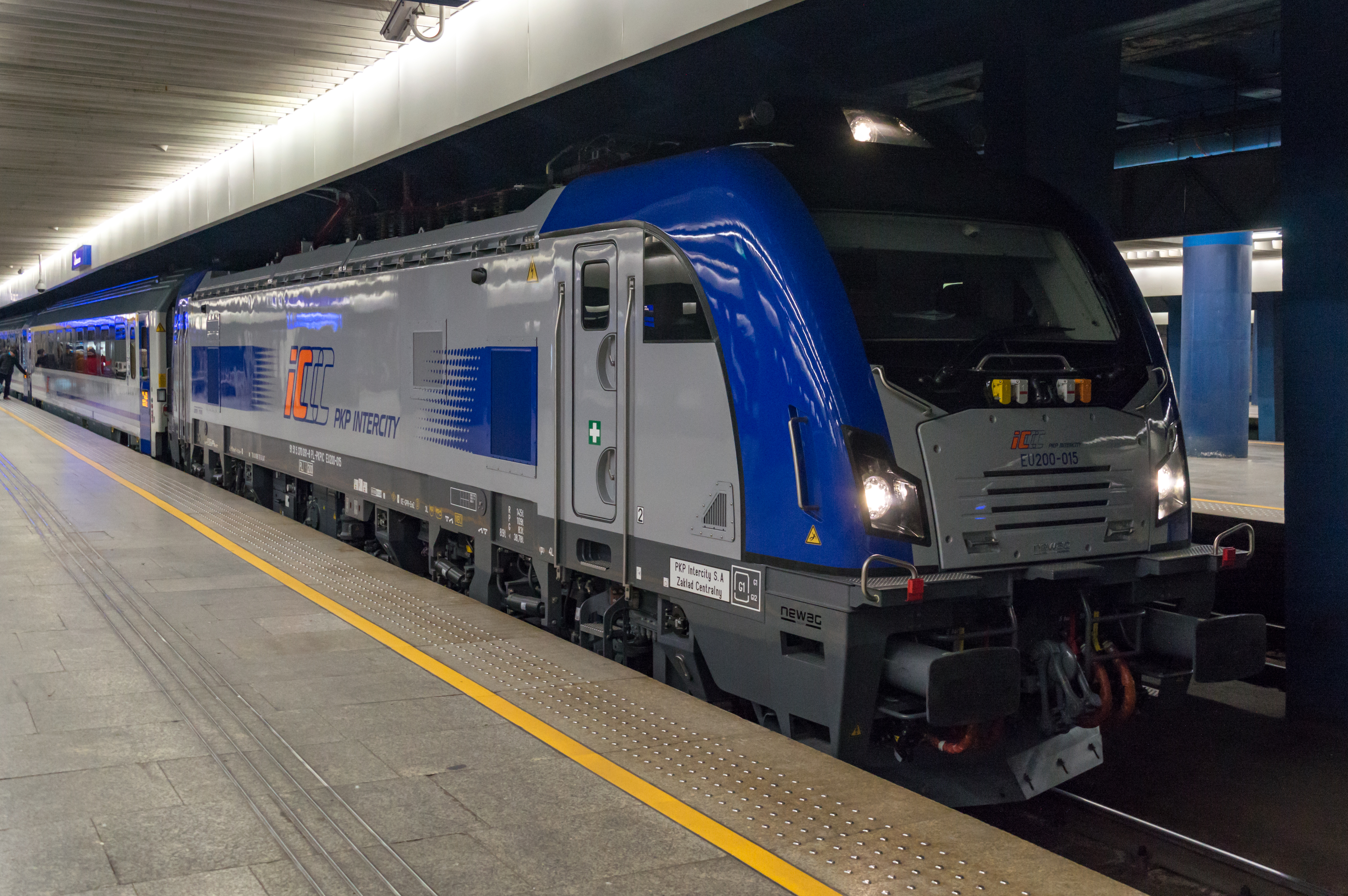
EU200 Griffin

=== Diesel locomotives ===
Series	Type	Number	Speed	Manufacturer	Modernized
SM42	6D	17	90 km/h	Fablok	
SM42	18D	10	90 km/h	Fablok	Newag
SU42	6Dl	10	90 km/h	Fablok	Newag
SU160	111Db	10	160 km/h	Pesa	
SM60	EffiShunter 300	10	60 km/h	CZ Loko	

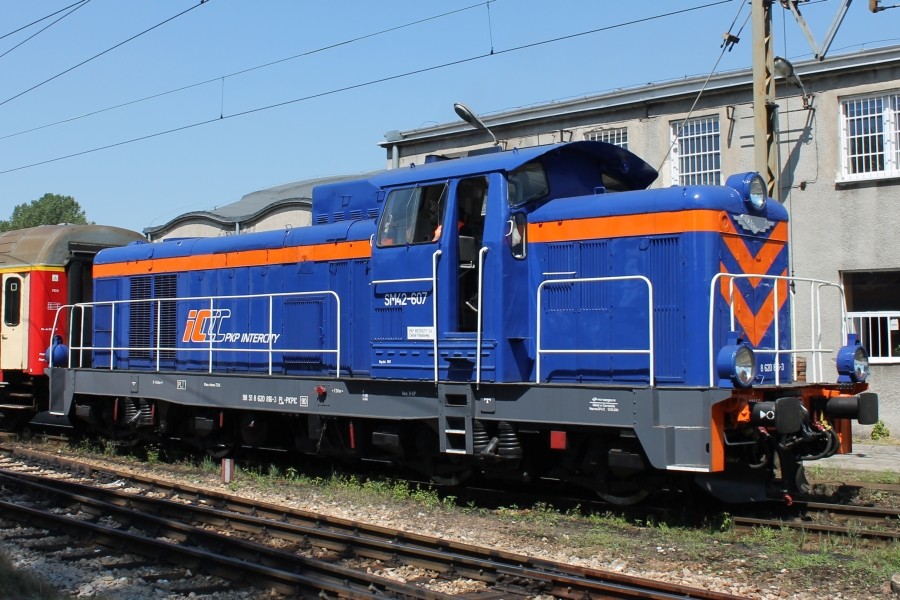
SM42 (6D)

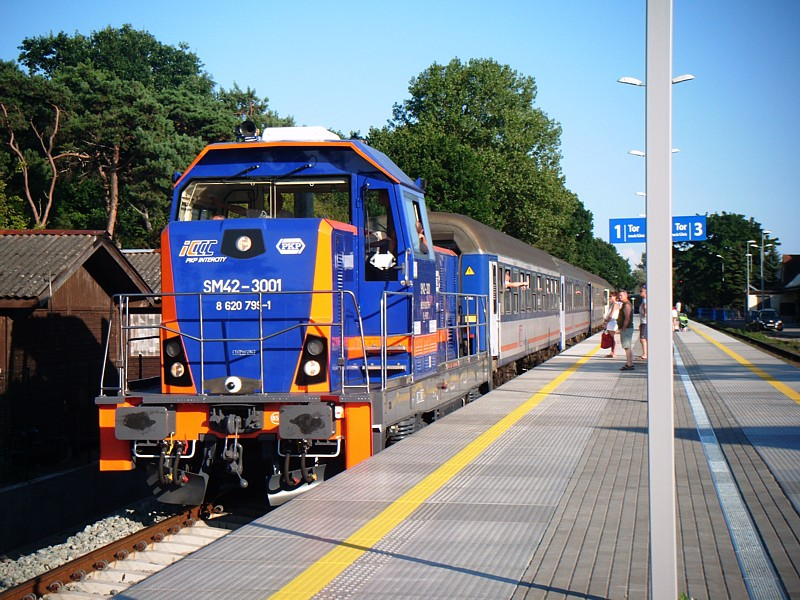
SM42 (18D)

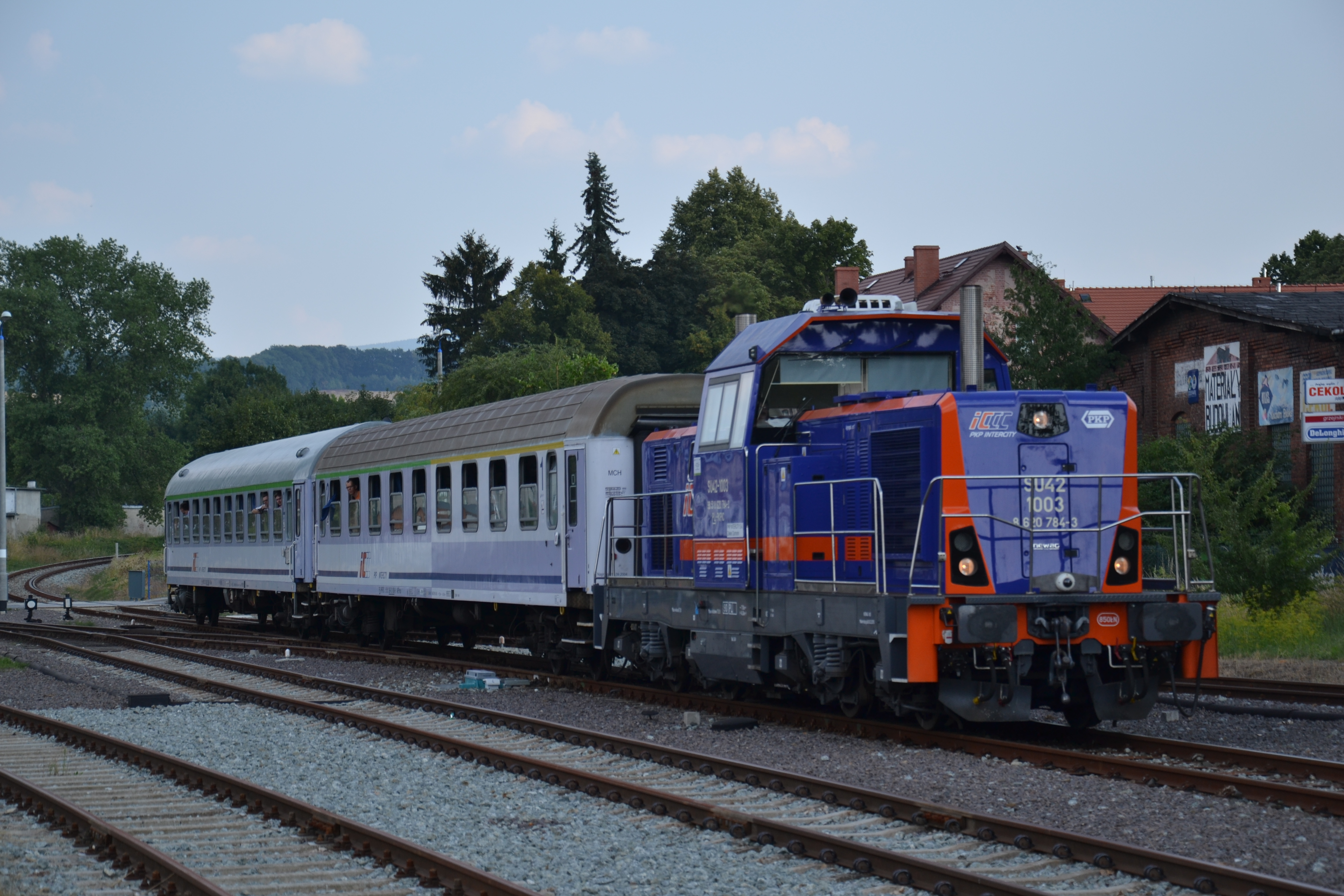
SU42

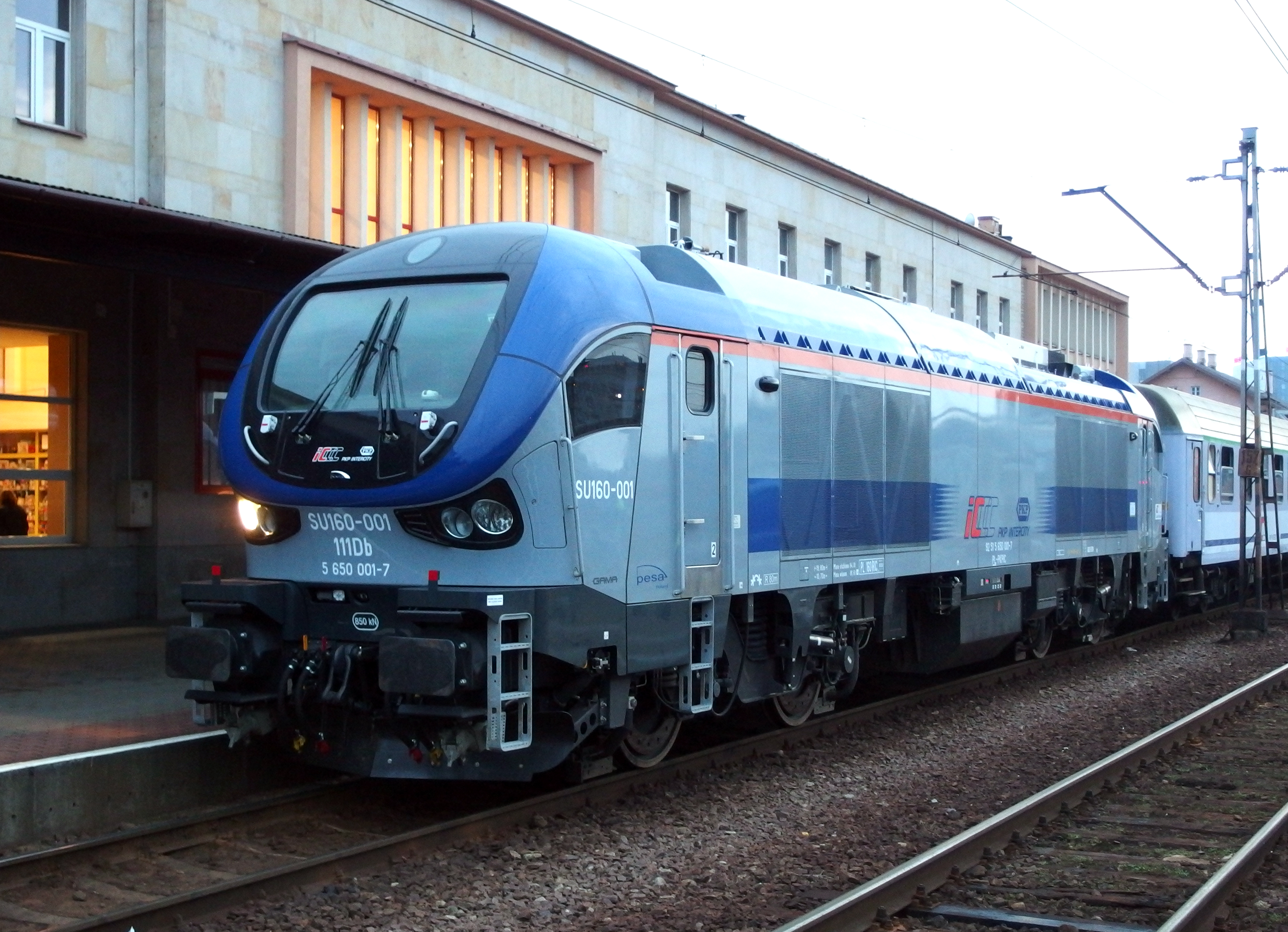
SU160 Gama

=== Electro-diesel locomotives ===
Series	Number	Speed	Manufacturer
111DEa Gama 3.0	0 out of 16	120 km/h diesel 160 km/h electric	Pesa

=== Electric multiple units ===
Series	Number	Number of units	Speed	Manufacturer
ED74	14	4	160 km/h	Pesa
ED160	32	8	160 km/h	Stadler Polska
ED161	20	8	160 km/h	Pesa
ED250	20	7	250 km/h	Alstom
Coradia Max	0 out of 42	6	200 km/h	Alstom

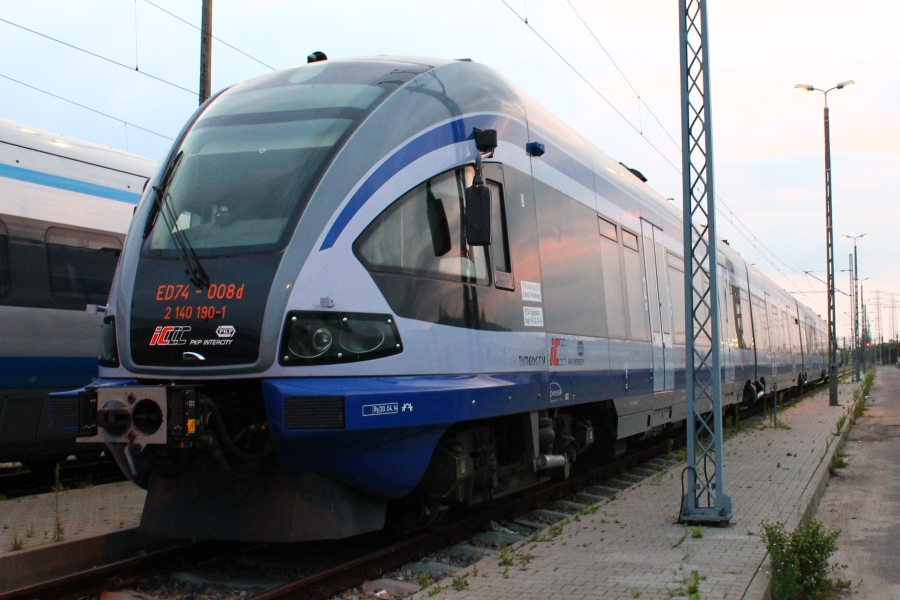
ED74 Bydgostia

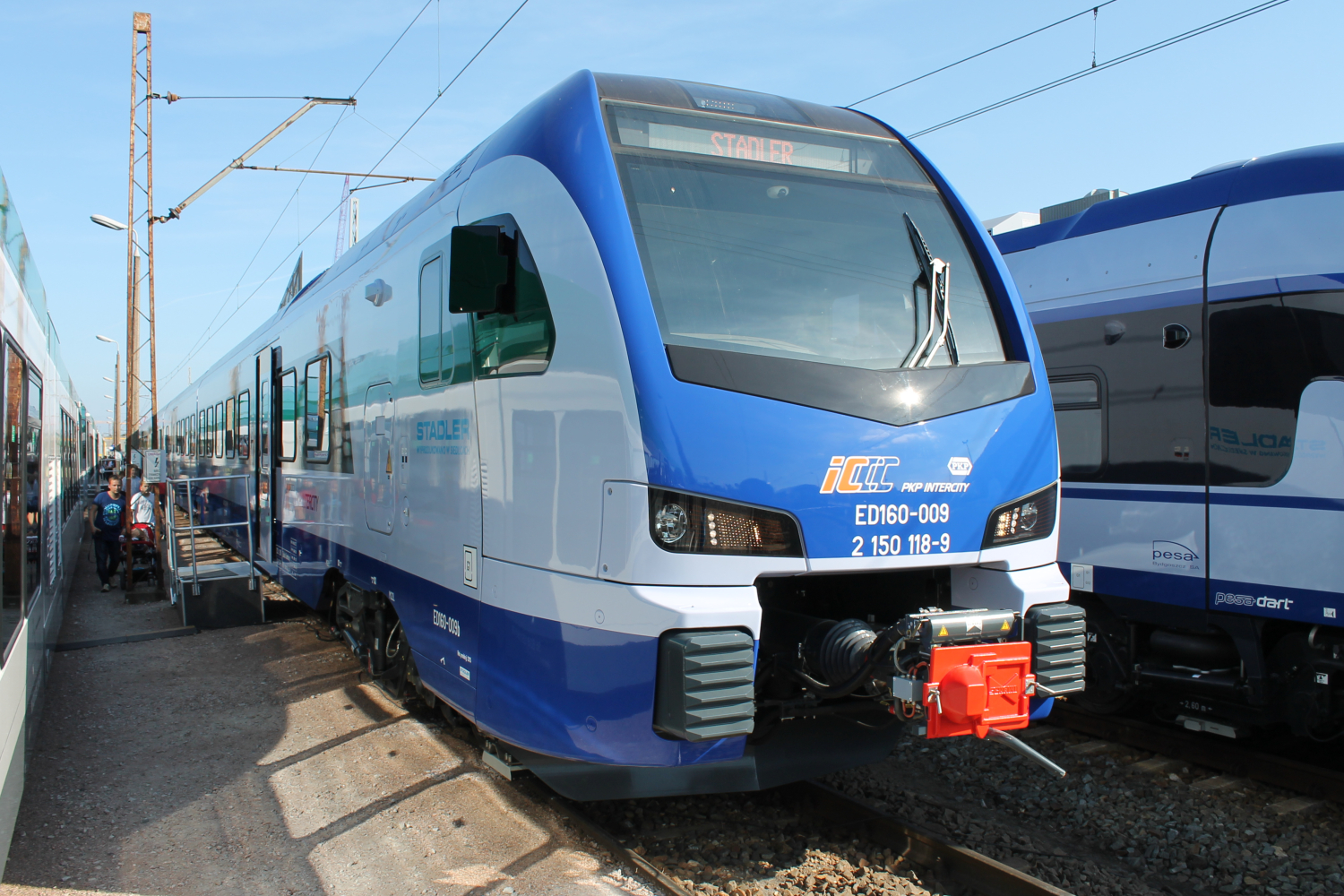
ED160 FLIRT^{3}

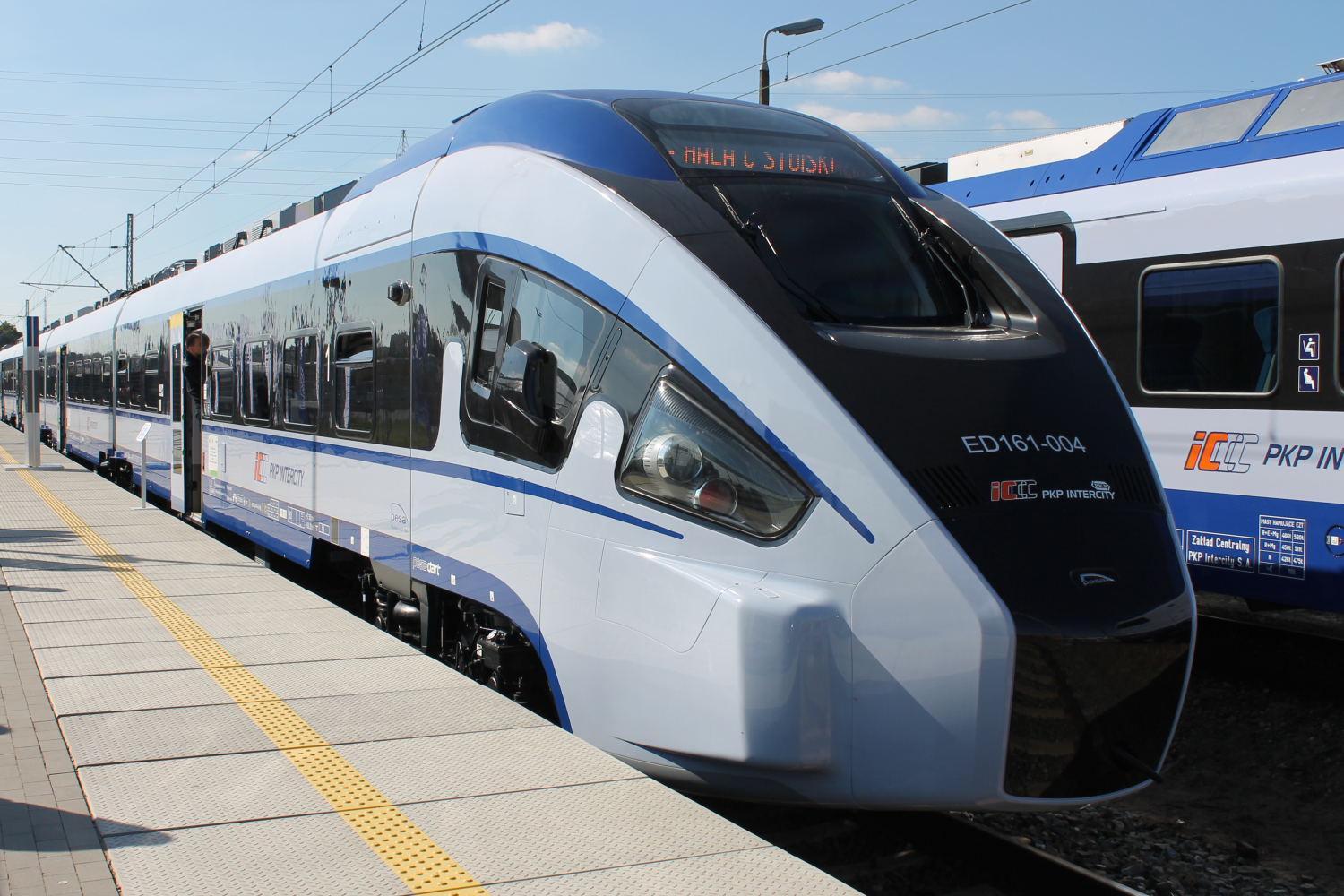
ED161 Dart

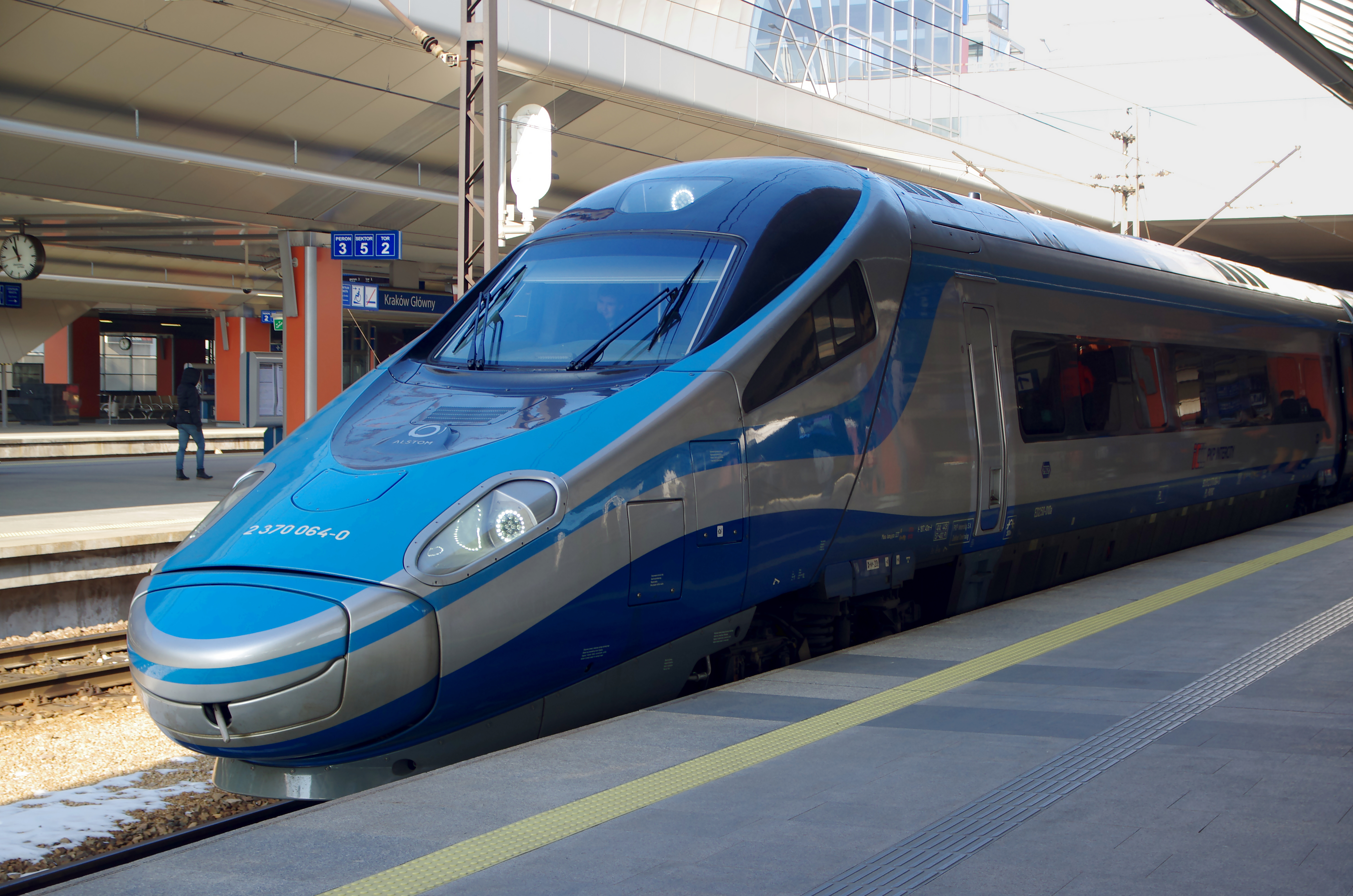
ED250 Pendolino

=== Electro-diesel multiple units ===
Series	Number	Number of units	Speed	Manufactured
ESD162 Impuls	0 out of 35	6	120 km/h diesel 160 km/h electric	Newag

== See also ==
- Polish locomotives designation
- Rail transport in Poland
