= Wind power in Poland =

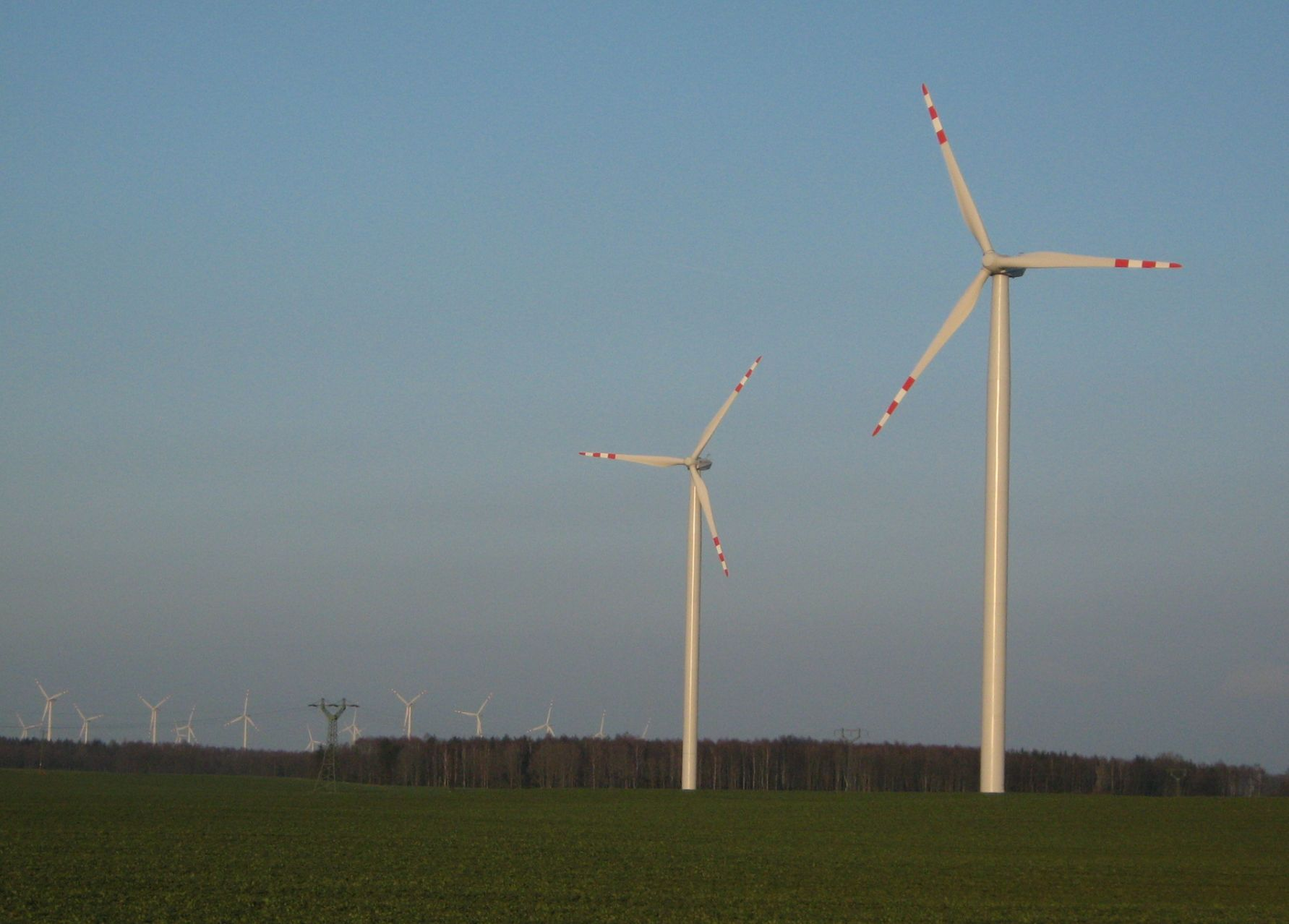
Karścino Wind Farm

Wind power generation in Poland

Wind power installed capacity in Poland

Wind power is a growing source of electricity in Poland. In 2019, wind was the second most important source of electricity produced in Poland, after coal, accounting for about 10% of the electricity production. The total wind power grid-connected capacity in Poland was 10,602 MW as of 2025.

== History ==
From 2012 to 2014 the Nowy Tomyśl Wind Turbines were the tallest wind turbines in the world with a pinnacle height of 210 metres (690 ft). They are still the tallest wind turbines installed on lattice towers.

In May 2018 state-owned PGE Polska Grupa Energetyczna decided to invest in offshore wind power pending delayed negotiations on building nuclear power plants in Poland. They aim to build 2.5 GW by 2030.

The total wind power grid-connected capacity in Poland was 11,005.7 MW as of May 31 2026. In September 2020, the government announced a 130 billion zloty (£26.5 billion) plan to invest in offshore wind. According to Poland's Supreme Audit Office, the Polish areas of the Baltic Sea could generate up to 28 GW in offshore wind power. The Polish government's energy development plan aims for an installation of 5.9GW of offshore wind power by 2030 and 11GW by 2040. A 1.5 GW offshore wind farm is currently being built near Słupsk, and a 1.2 GW near Leba.

== Capacity and production ==
Cumulative wind capacity in Poland
Year	2001	2002	2003	2004	2005	2006	2007	2008	2009	2010	2011	2012	2013	2014	2015	2016	2017	2018	2019	2020	2021	2022	2023	2024	2025
Installed capacity (MW)	0	27	63	63	83	153	276	544	725	1,180	1,616	2,497	3,390	3,834	4,886	5,747	5,759	5,766	5,838	6,298	6,967	8,150	9,343	10,152	10,602
Generation (GWh)					132	234	506	796	1,051	1,843	2,745	4,435	5,822	7,184	10,858	11,623	14,685	15,800							
% of electricity production					0.1%	0.2%	0.3%	0.6%	0.8%	1.3%	1.8%	2.74%	3.53%	4.59%	*6.6%	7.1%	9.8%	10.0%							
*Provisional estimate

As of the end of 2015, total installed capacity was 5.1 gigawatts (GW), which provided 10,858 gigawatt-hours (GW·h) — around 6.22% of the electricity consumed in the country. By year end 2016 total installed capacity had risen to 5,782 MW.

Energy production sources are also registered by the state Energy Regulatory Office (URE).

=== Comparison to European Union wind power ===
EU and Poland wind energy capacity (MW)
No	Country	2023	2022	2021	2016	2015	2014	2013	2012	2011	2010	2005	2000
-	EU-27	220,253	204,499	188,892	142,042	128,751	117,384	105,696	93,957	84,074	74,767	34,383	9,678
9	Poland	9,428	8,256	7,306	5,782	5,100	3,834	3,390	2,497	1,616	1,107	83	0

== List of Polish wind farms ==
Some of the points of production are:

Place	Voivodeship	Installed capacity (MW)	Commissioned
Potęgowo	Pomerania	219	2020
Margonin	Greater Poland	120	2010
Marszewo I & II	West Pomerania	100	
Kopaniewo (FW Lotnisko)	Pomerania	94.5	2015
Resko I & II	West Pomerania	90.3	
Karścino Wind Farm	West Pomerania	90	2008
Żuromin	Masovia	61.2	2012
Nekla	Greater Poland	52.5	2010
Tymień Wind Farm	West Pomerania	50	
Banie-Kozielice	West Pomerania	50	2015
Pelplin	Pomerania	49	2012
Gawłowice	Kuyavian-Pomeranian	48.3	2014
Łosino near Słupsk	Pomerania	48	
Gołdap	Warmia-Masuria	48	2011
Mycielin	Lubusz	46	2015
Skurpie	Warmia-Masuria	43.7	2015
Płaszewo-Lulemino	Pomerania	41.4	2011
Suwałki	Podlaskie	41	2009
Kisielice I & II	Warmia-Masuria	53.6	
Karwice	West Pomerania	40	2015
Wicko	Pomerania	40	
Jagniątkowo (Lake Ostrowo)	West Pomerania	34.2	
Łukaszów	Lower Silesian	34	2012
Śniatowo	West Pomerania	32	
Kamieńsk	Łódź	31.2	
Karnice I	West Pomerania	29.9	2009
Zagórze	West Pomerania	30	2003
Wojciechowo	Pomerania	28.3	2014
Rajgród	Podlaskie	25.3	2014
Modlikowice	Lower Silesian	24	2012
Puck	Pomerania	22	2007
Cisowo	West Pomerania	18	2001
Lisewo	Pomerania	10.8	2007
Lubawa (Elektrownia Wiatrowa "Rożental")	Warmia-Mazuria	8	2013
Barzowice	West Pomerania	5.1	2001
BC-Wind	Pomerania	390	TBD

== See also ==
- Renewable energy in Poland
- Solar power in Poland
- Renewable energy by country
