= Bolesławice, Pomeranian Voivodeship =

Part of the city of Słupsk, Poland

Bolesławice
- Village
- Location within Poland
- Coordinates: 54°26′N 16°57′E
- Country: Poland
- Voivodeship: Pomeranian
- County: Słupsk

Bolesławice (German: Ulrichsfelde, Kashubian: Bòlesławice) is a part of the city of Słupsk, Poland, and until December 31, 2025, a separate town in the Kobylnica commune, Słupsk County. It is located in the southwestern part of the city, at the Słupsk Zachód junction of the S6 expressway, north of railway line No. 202. It borders the city of Kobylnica, the villages of Widzino and Reblino in the Kobylnica commune, and the village of Redęcin in the Redzikowo commune.
