= Jerzy Snopek =

Polish literary historian

Prof. Jerzy Snopek
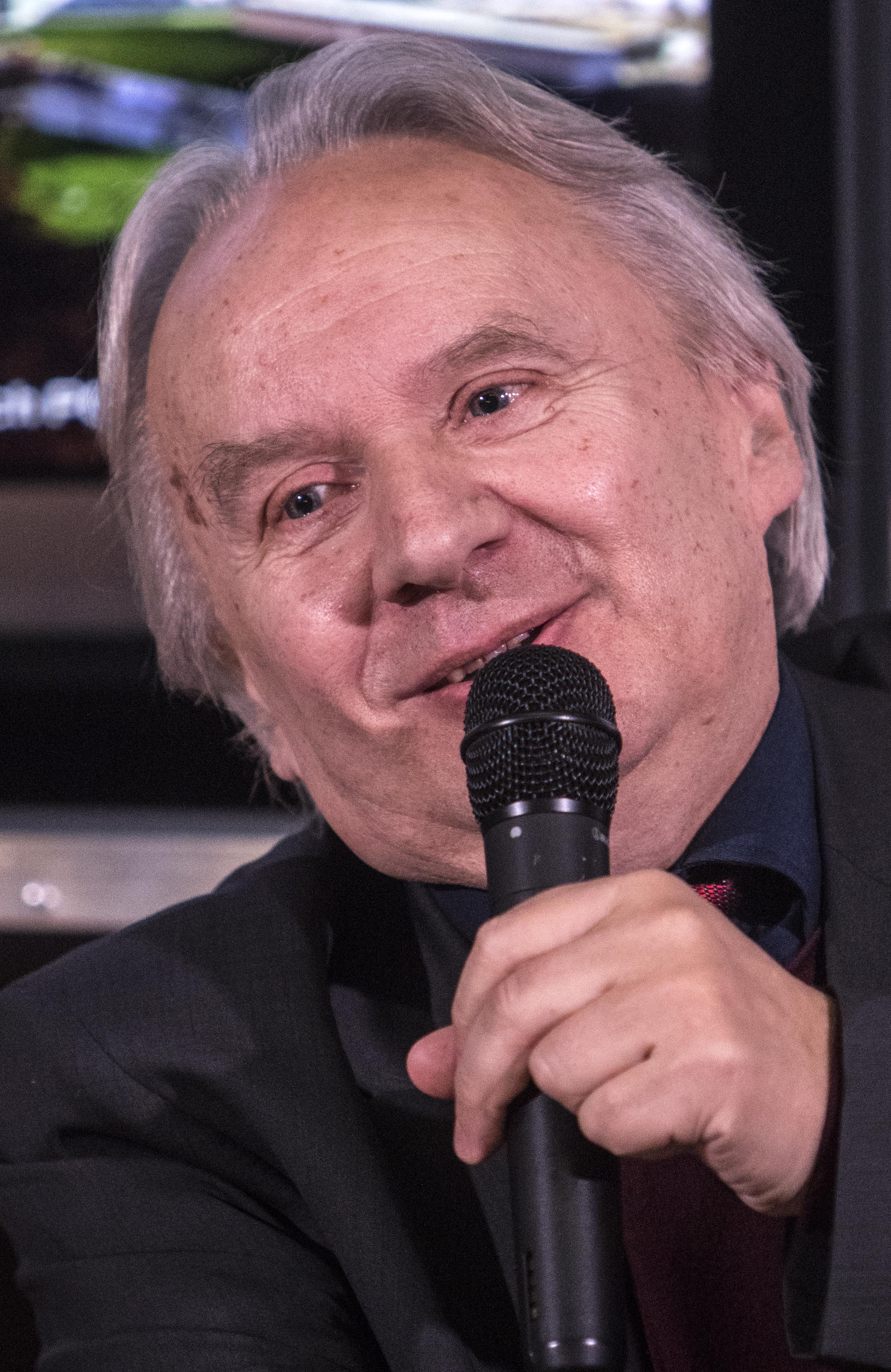

Poland Ambassador to Hungary
- In office 16 November 2016 – 31 March 2022
- Preceded by: Roman Kowalski
- Succeeded by: Sebastian Kęciek

Personal details
- Born: 3 August 1952 (age 74) Wrząca
- Spouse: Márta Gedeon
- Education: University of Warsaw
- Profession: Lecturer

Jerzy Snopek (born 3 August 1952, Wrząca) is a Polish literary historian and translator. He served as an ambassador to Hungary from 2016 to 2022.

== Life ==
Snopek graduated in Polish philology at the University of Warsaw. He also gained from there his doctoral degree. In 1993, he received his post-doctoral degree (habilitation) at the Institute of Literary Research of the Polish Academy of Sciences, presenting a dissertation on the literary life in the Kraków area from 1750 to 1815.

He worked as a Polish literature lecturer at the Faculty of Humanities of the Eötvös Loránd University in Budapest (1985–1990). He co-operated also with the Central European University at that time. Between 1991 and 1997, he was secretary at the Hungarian Cultural Institute in Warsaw, and between 1995 and 2006 he held the post of scientific director at the Institute of Literary Research of the Polish Academy of Sciences. He has been a visiting professor at the Pázmány Péter Catholic University in Hungary. In 2002, he was among the founders of the Warsaw University of Humanities where he lectured for the following ten years. Since 2002, he has been an active member of the Stefan Żeromski Heritage Foundation.

On 28 October 2016, Snopek was nominated to be the ambassador to Hungary, and was subsequently presented with his letter of credence on 23 November 2016. He ended his term on 31 March 2022.

He is married to Márta Gedeon.

== Works ==
Snopek wroteauthored over 400 articles and essays, and two books:

- Jerzy Snopek, Objawienie i oświecenie: z dziejów libertynizmu w Polsce, Polska Akademia Nauk. Instytut Badań Literackich, Wrocław 1986.
- Jerzy Snopek, Węgry: zarys dziejów i kultury, Jerzy Snopek, Warszawa 2002.

Translations

- Antoni Cetnarowicz, Csaba G. Kiss, István Kovács (ed.), Węgry – Polska w Europie Środkowej: historia – literatura: księga pamiątkowa ku czci profesora Wacława Felczaka, Kraków: Instytut Historii Uniwersytetu Jagiellońskiego, 1997.
- István Kovács, Polacy w węgierskiej Wiośnie Ludów 1848–1849 : „Byliśmy z Wami do końca”, Warszawa 1999.
- Csaba Gy. Kiss (ed.), Strażnik pamięci w czasach amnezji: Węgrzy o Herbercie, Warszawa 2008.

== Honours ==
- Literatura na Świecie prize of the year for the best poetic translation
- Order of Merit of the Kingdom of Hungary
- Teleki Medail (2018)
