= Paula Bonte =

German painter

- Born: 15 April 1840; Magdeburg, Germany
- Died: 21 September 1902 (aged 62); Berlin, Germany
- Known for: Painting

Paula Bonte (1840–1902) was a German landscape painter.

== Biography ==
Bonte was born on 15 April 1840 in Magdeburg, Germany. She studied with Eduard Pape and Otto von Kameke in Berlin. She exhibited her work at the Woman's Building at the 1893 World's Columbian Exposition in Chicago, Illinois. Bonte was a friend of fellow landscape painter Marie von Keudell, with whom she shared a studio.

Bonte died on 21 September 1902 in Berlin.

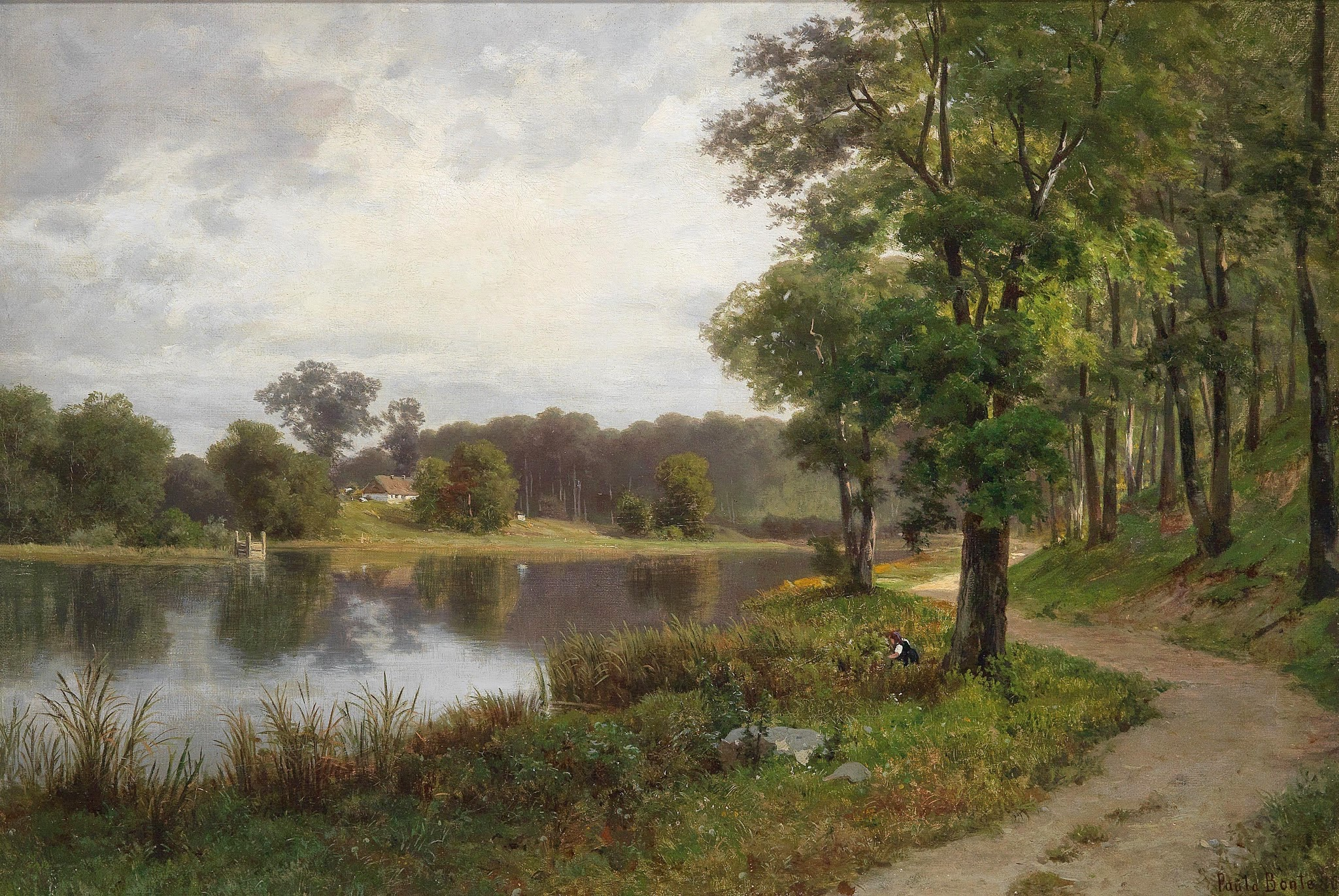
Landscape with Pond and Decorative Figures by Paula Bonte
