= Gieldon =

Gieldon may refer to:

- Giełdon, Chojnice County, Poland
- Giełdoń, Słupsk County, Poland
