= Widzino railway station =

Railway station in Widzino, Poland

Coordinates: 54.4286°N 16.9625°E

Widzino
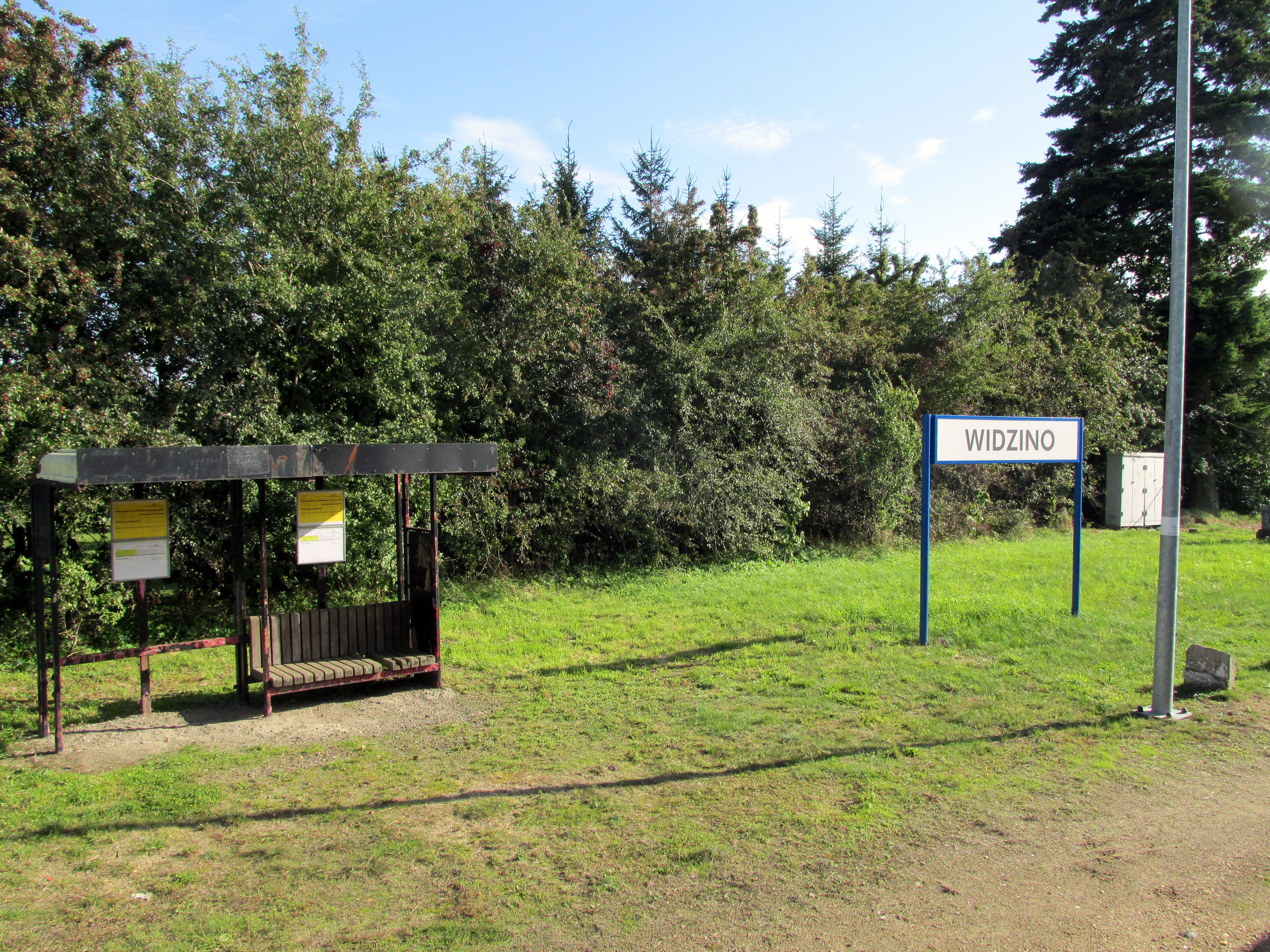

General information
- Location: Widzino; Poland
- Owner: Polskie Koleje Państwowe S.A.
- Line: 405: Piła Główna - Ustka Uroczysko

History
- Former names: Veddin

Services
Preceding station	Polregio	Following station
Słonowice towards Miastko, Szczecinek or Chojnice	PR	Kobylnica Słupska towards Słupsk
Location

Widzino is a Polskie Koleje Państwowe (PKP) railway station in Widzino (Pomeranian Voivodeship), Poland.

== Lines crossing the station ==
Start station	End station	Line type
Piła	Ustka	Passenger/Freight

== Train services ==
The station is served by the following services:

- Regional services (R) Słupsk — Miastko
- Regional services (R) Słupsk — Miastko — Szczecinek
- Regional services (R) Słupsk — Miastko — Szczecinek — Chojnice
