= Marie von Keudell =

German painter

- Born: 16 July 1838; Launicken, East Prussia
- Died: 1918 (aged 79–80); Berlin, Germany
- Known for: Painting

Marie von Keudell (1838–1918) was a German painter known for her landscape painting.

== Biography ==
Keudell was born on 16 July 1838 in Launicken, East Prussia. She studied with Adolf Dressler, Eduard Pape and Otto von Kameke in Berlin. Keudell exhibited her work at the Woman's Building at the 1893 World's Columbian Exposition in Chicago, Illinois. She also served as the chairwoman of the Art Commission of the German Art Department "Women" for the Exposition.

Keudell was a member of the Verein der Berliner Künstlerinnen (Association of Berlin Artists) from 1867 to 1916. She exhibited her paintings at the Große Berliner Kunstausstellung (Great Berlin Art Exhibitions) between 1893 and 1912. Keudell was a friend of fellow landscape painter Paula Bonte, with whom she shared a studio.

Keudell died in February 1918 in Berlin.

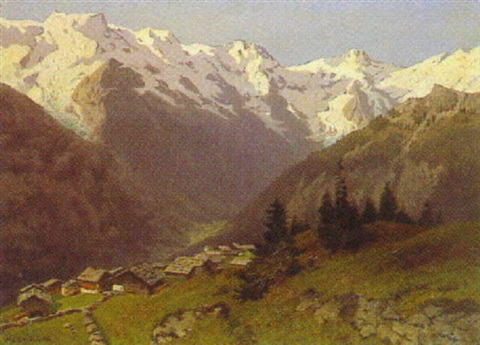
Alpenlandschaft bei Mürren im Berner Oberland by Maria Von Keudell, 1913
