= Trolleybuses in Słupsk =

Trolleybus system in Słupsk, Poland

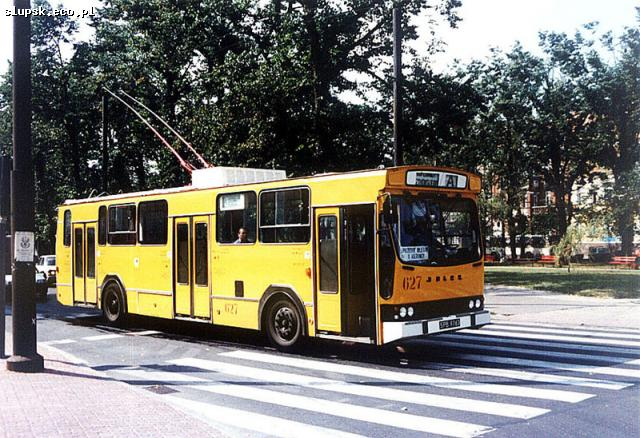
- Jelcz PR110E trolleybus, 1999

Overview
- Locale: Poland, Słupsk
- Transit type: trolleybus
- Number of lines: 3
- Line number: A-C
- Website: http://www.mzk.slupsk.pl

Operation
- Began operation: 21 July 1985
- Ended operation: 18 October 1999
- Operator(s): MZK Słupsk
- Number of vehicles: 5

Technical
- System length: 12 mi (19 km)
Trolleybus system in 1999

The Słupsk trolleybus system was a trolleybus network operated by MPK Słupsk in Słupsk, Poland, from 1985 to 1999. The system measured at the most 19.1 km on three lines.

== History ==
The first trolleybus projects in Słupsk date back to the 1930s, when one trolleybus line was planned. It was to connect Kobylnica with Brusków Wielki. This plan was not implemented.

At the end of the 1970s, the voivodeship transport company WPKM Słupsk developed a project of Słupsk trolleybus system. The plan assumed the construction of five trolleybus lines, including one to Ustka, 18 km away from Słupsk. First construction works began in April 1985.

The opening of the first line, marked with A, took place on 21 July 1985. The line was served by ten ZiU-9 trolleybuses purchased from the USSR. The next two lines were launched on 11 November 1986 (B) and 27 June 1987 (C). Bad economic situation does not allowed the opening of lines D and E.

In the early 1990s, eleven functional trolleybuses were scrapped. This caused rolling stock problems and forced trolleybuses to be supported by buses. However, three buses were converted into trolleybuses.

In July 1997, MZK Słupsk exchanged seven operational trolleybuses for seven buses from Tychy. The remaining vehicles were not enough to fully serve the system. The network's profitability has dropped dramatically. Until 1999, only seven trolleybuses were able to operate. It started first voice opinions about the network closure. Pro-decommission arguments were as follows:

- maintaining infrastructure for five vehicles is not cost-effective
- cables supplying the rectifier station should be replaced
- trolleybuses slow down the traffic
- the network is old and exploited
- rectifier stations produce too much electric energy

In May 1999 began dismantling of the overhead lines at Hubalczyków street, meaning the end of lines B and C. On 18 October 1999, the last A-line trolleybuses went into the streets.

== Lines ==
Lines as of 1987:

Scheme	Length	Routes
bezramki	4.7 km	Rzymowskiego – 11 Listopada – Szczecińska – Tuwima – Deotymy – 9 Marca – Sienkiewicza – Kopernika – Sienkiewicza – 9 Marca – Tuwima – Szczecińska – 11 Listopada – Rzymowskiego
bezramki	6.6 km	Rzymowskiego – 11 Listopada – Szczecińska – Tuwima – Deotymy – Wałowa – Zamkowa – Garncarska – Wiejska – Bohaterów Westerplatte – Hubalczyków – Bohaterów Westerplatte – Wiejska – Garncarska – Zamkowa – Jagiełły – 9 Marca – Tuwima – Szczecińska – 11 Listopada – Rzymowskiego
bezramki	7.8 km	Rzymowskiego – Piłsudskiego – Sobieskiego – 3 Maja – Wolności – Kopernika – Sienkiewicza – 9 Marca – Wałowa – Zamkowa – Garncarska – Wiejska – Bohaterów Westerplatte – Hubalczyków – Bohaterów Westerplatte – Wiejska – Garncarska – Zamkowa – Jagiełły – 9 Marca – Sienkiewicza – Kopernika – Wolności – 3 Maja – Sobieskiego – Piłsudskiego – Rzymowskiego
