= Barbara Deppert-Lippitz =

Dr. Dr. h.c. Barbara Deppert-Lippitz
- Born: Barbara Lippitz; October 3, 1939; Kublitz, farther Pomerania, German Empire
- Died: July 18, 2023 (aged 83); Frankfurt am Main, Germany
- Education: University of Frankfurt
- Occupation: Classical archaeology
- Spouse: Kurt Deppert (m.1972)

Barbara Deppert-Lippitz (née Lippitz; 3 October 1939 - 18 July 2023) was a German classical archeologist and expert witness for court cases concerning classical antiquities and the restitution of illegally acquired art and antiquities.

== Early life ==
Barbara Lippitz was born in Kublitz, farther Pomerania, the second child of Kurt Lippitz a landowner and farmer, and his wife Johanna (née Lange). Deppert-Lippitz grew up in her native village before being forced to flee to Denmark with her mother and siblings in 1945. She and her family lived in a refugee camp there from 1945 to 1947 before moving to Frankfurt. There she attended the Ziehenschule.

In 1961 she began studying classical archeology, provincial roman archeology and ancient history at the University of Frankfurt from which she graduated in 1969 with a doctorate. Her dissertation was written on the subject of ancient Roman golden jewellery.

== Career ==
In 1991 she qualified to be an expert witness for courts and private clients. In 2005 she became a court-appointed expert on the restitution of illicitly acquired cultural property.

In 2006 she began working with the office of the Romanian attorney-general at the court of Appeals in Alba Iulia, at the time under the leadership of the then-Attorney-General Augustin Lazăr, to bring looters of Romanian archeological artefacts (objects of Romania's cultural heritage) to justice and recover the stolen artefacts. The long-running investigations into the origins and whereabouts of a number of golden spiral-shaped arm-hoops from the Dacian peoples led to the arrest of 33 individuals. Of the 24 stolen artefacts that had been looted around the ancient Roman excavation site of Sarmizegetusa Regia, 13 were recovered and returned to Bucharest. The golden spirals were widely considered an archaeological marvel. They were first exhibited in the National History Museum of Romania in 2011 and became part of the permanent exhibition. Dr. Deppert-Lippitz's activism and expertise were considered crucial elements of the investigation and the characterisation and contextualisation of the artefacts' archeological importance and value.

From 2012 to her death Deppert-Lippitz was a board member of the Verein Freunde Frankfurts (Association of the Friends of Frankfurt), dedicated to the preservation of the city's cultural heritage. She first acted as Chief Executive, then Chair-Person and finally honorary Chair-Person of the organisation.

== Personal life ==
In 1972 Lippitz married the classical archeologist and dealer of antiquities Kurt Deppert (1926-1994). They had one son.

== Honours ==
In 2007 Deppert-Lippitz was awarded a Doctor Honoris Causa by the Universitatea "1 Decembrie 1918" Alba Iulia (University "1st December 1918" of Alba Iulia). The following year she was made an officer of the |"Ordinul Meritul Kultural" (National Cultural Order of Merit) of Romania. Both distinctions were awarded for "extraordinary services" in the restitution of illicitly acquired artefacts.

In 2024 an international conference at the Muzeul Național al Unirii din Alba Iulia was held in her honour under the title: "Patrimonium 2024". In memoriam Dr. h.c. Barbara Deppert-Lippitz.

== Publications (Selection) ==
- (under the name of Bärbel Pfeiler): Römischer Goldschmuck des ersten und zweiten Jahrhunderts n. Chr. nach datierten Funden. Zabern, Mainz 1970 (Dissertation).
- Goldschmuck der Römerzeit. Ausgewählte Stücke aus den Sammlungen des Römisch-Germanischen Zentralmuseums. Römisch-Germanisches Zentralmuseum. 1984.
- Die Münzprägung Milets vom vierten bis ersten Jahrhundert v. Chr. Typos. Sauerländer. 1984. ISBN 3-7941-2569-X.
- Goldschmuck der Römerzeit im Römisch-Germanischen Zentralmuseum. Kataloge vor- und frühgeschichtlicher Altertümer. Dr. Rudolf Habelt. 1985. ISBN 3-7749-2236-5.
- Griechischer Goldschmuck. Kulturgeschichte der antiken Welt. von Zabern. 1985. ISBN 3-8053-0479-X.
- Die Schraube zwischen Macht und Pracht: das Gewinde in der Antike. Thorbecke. 1995. ISBN 3-7995-3628-0.
- Ancient gold jewelry at the Dallas Museum of Art. Dallas Museum of Art in association with the University of Washington Press, Dallas 1996, ISBN 0-936227-19-2.
- The Gift of the Gods. Jewelry from the Ancient World. Fortuna Fine Arts, New York 1998 (Verkaufskatalog).
- Lazăr, Augustin; Deppert-Lipitz, Barbara; Ferri, Paolo Giorgio (2008). "Spirale dacice din aur din Munţii Orăştiei / The Dacian Gold Spirals from the Orăştiei Mountains / Dakische Goldspiralen aus den Orăştiei Bergen" (PDF). Proceedings of the International Conference on Combating the Criminality against the European Archaeological Heritage, Alba Iulia, 28–31 May 2007. Bucharest: Lumina lex: 203–288.
- Antike geschnittene Steine von Ägypten bis Afghanistan. Tauberverlag. 2015. ISBN 978-3-943462-12-8.
- ... mit unerbittlichem Enthusiasmus und Autorität. Zehn Aufsätze zu Frankfurt (überarbeitet von Barbara Deppert-Lippitz). Mäzene, Stifter, Stadtkultur. Frankfurter Bürgerstiftung im Holzhausenschlösschen. 2016. ISBN 978-3-934123-25-0.

== In popular culture ==
- Barbara Deppert-Lippitz. A Destiny under the Sign of Treasures. Vol. 10. 2023-11-26. doi:10.14795/j.v10i3.926. ISSN 2360-266X. (Nachruf, englisch)
- Augustin Lazăr, Sorin Alămoreanu, Marius M. Ciuta: In memoriam Dr. h.c. Barbara Deppert-Lippitz. Combaterea spalarii bunurilor culturale pe piata antichitatilor. Rolul expertului judiciar. Editura Universul Juridic, Bucuresti 2024, ISBN 978-606-39-1473-7.
- The Hunt for Transylvanian Gold, Rumänien 2017, Regie Andrei-Nicolae Teodorescu, 50 Minuten, (englisch/rumänisch). Eine deutsche Synchronfassung unter dem Namen Die Jagd nach den goldenen Armreifen wurde in ZDFinfo am 13. Juli 2019 erstausgestrahlt.
