= Zbyszewo, Pomeranian Voivodeship =

Zbyszewo
- Village
- Location within Poland
- Coordinates: 54°19′49″N 16°55′6″E
- Country: Poland
- Voivodeship: Pomeranian
- County: Słupsk
- Gmina: Kobylnica
- Population: 30

Zbyszewo [zbɨˈʂɛvɔ] is a village in the administrative district of Gmina Kobylnica, within Słupsk County, Pomeranian Voivodeship, in northern Poland.

For the history of the region, see History of Pomerania.
