= Żelki =

- Village
- Location within Poland
- Coordinates: 54°20′24″N 17°3′47″E
- Country: Poland
- Voivodeship: Pomeranian
- County: Słupsk
- Gmina: Kobylnica
- Population: 58

Żelki [ˈʐɛlki] (German: Groß Silkow) is a village in the administrative district of Gmina Kobylnica, within Słupsk County, Pomeranian Voivodeship, in northern Poland.

For the history of the region, see History of Pomerania.

== Notable residents ==
- Walter Neumann-Silkow (1894–1941), Wehrmacht general
