= Komiłowo =

- Village
- Location within Poland
- Coordinates: 54°21′24″N 17°02′47″E
- Country: Poland
- Voivodeship: Pomeranian
- County: Słupsk
- Gmina: Kobylnica
- Area: 0.89 km^{2} (0.34 sq mi)
  - Urban: 0.18 km^{2} (0.069 sq mi)

Komiłowo [kɔmiˈwɔvɔ] is a village in the administrative district of Gmina Kobylnica, within Słupsk County, Pomeranian Voivodeship, in northern Poland.

For the history of the region, see History of Pomerania.
