= Port of Władysławowo =

- The logo of Szkuner Sp. z o.o.

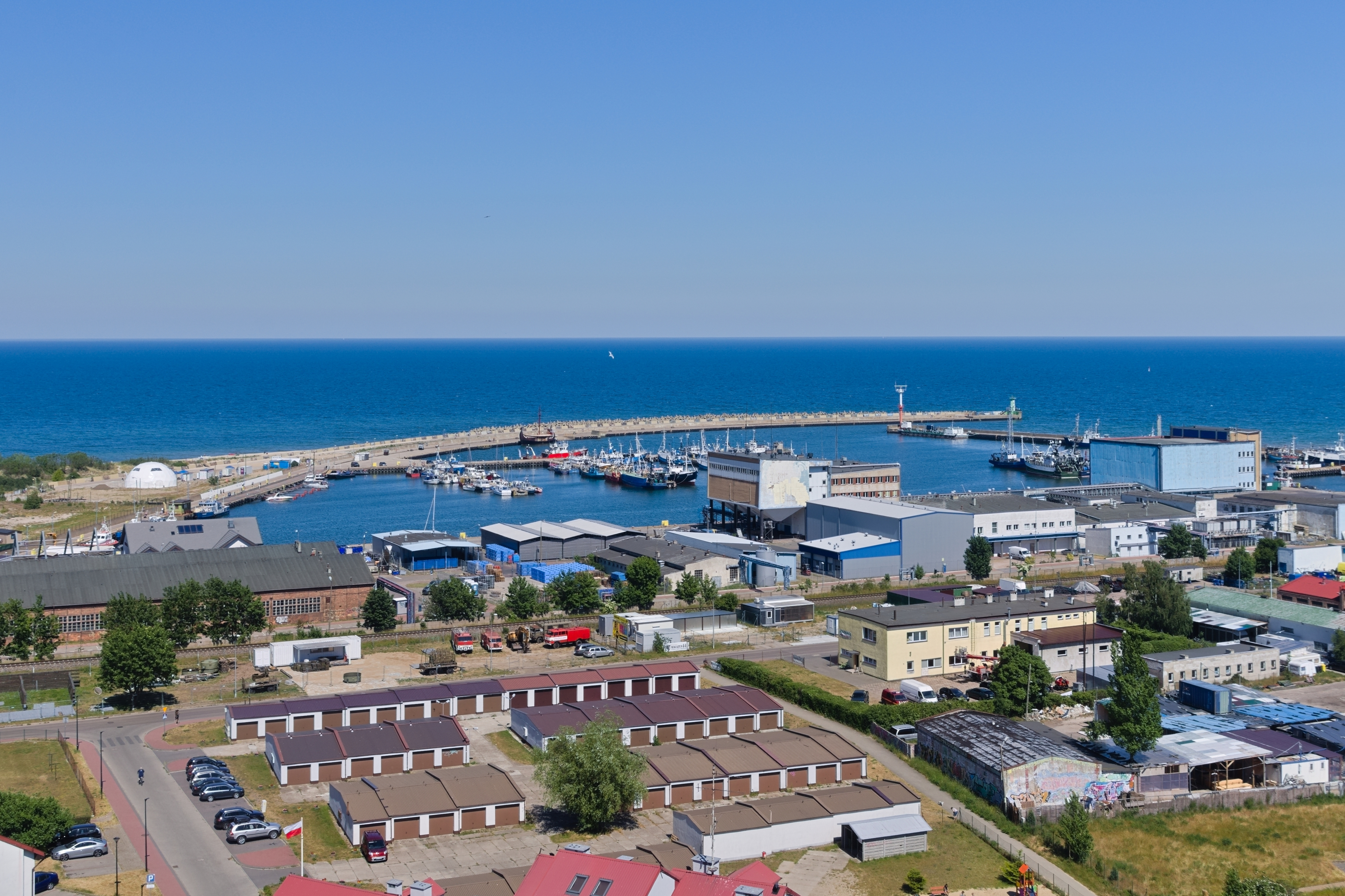
- An aerial view of the Port of Władysławowo (2022)
- Interactive map of Port of Władysławowo
- Location within Poland

Location
- Country: Poland
- Location: Władysławowo
- Coordinates: 54°47′45″N 18°25′00″E
- UN/LOCODE: PLWLA

Details
- Opened: 1938-05-06
- Operated by: Szkuner Sp. z o.o.
- Owned by: Puck County
- Type of Harbor: coastal breakwater
- No. of wharfs: 7
- No. of piers: 2
- Draft depth: 4 m, 4.5 m
- Ship length: 70 m, 80 m

Statistics
- Annual cargo tonnage: 27,869 (2018)
- Passenger traffic: 69,240 (2018)
- Website; Port - Szkuner Sp. z o.o.

The Port of Władysławowo [vwadɨswavɔvɔ] is a Polish seaport situated on the southern coast of the Baltic Sea within the northern region of Pomeranian Voivodeship, specifically in Puck County and the city of Władysławowo. It is the biggest fishing port of the country, hosting approximately 120 fishing boats and vessels.

The harbour includes a sailing and passenger marina and performs a small reloading service for goods in mainly domestic traffic. Facilities within the port encompass a shipyard, fish-processing plants, a shell ice factory and a fish meal factory. Additionally, the port serves as a coastal SAR (Search And Rescue) station and a sea border crossing.

Since 2025 the port has been designated to function as a service port for the BC-Wind offshore wind farm, which will be located about 36 kilometers away.

Lengths of wharfs, piers and docks
Wharf/pier/dock	Length [m]
Postojowe Wschodnie wharf	185
Stoczniowe wharf	105
Remontowy dock	52
Slipowy dock	106,5
Pasażerskie pier	135
Wyładunkowe wharf	340
Paliwowe wharf	120
Jachtowe wharf	90
Duńskie pier	185
Robocze wharf	61
Postojowe Północne wharf	150 + 250
Dock 1	101
Dock 2	101
Dock 3	86

== Gallery ==
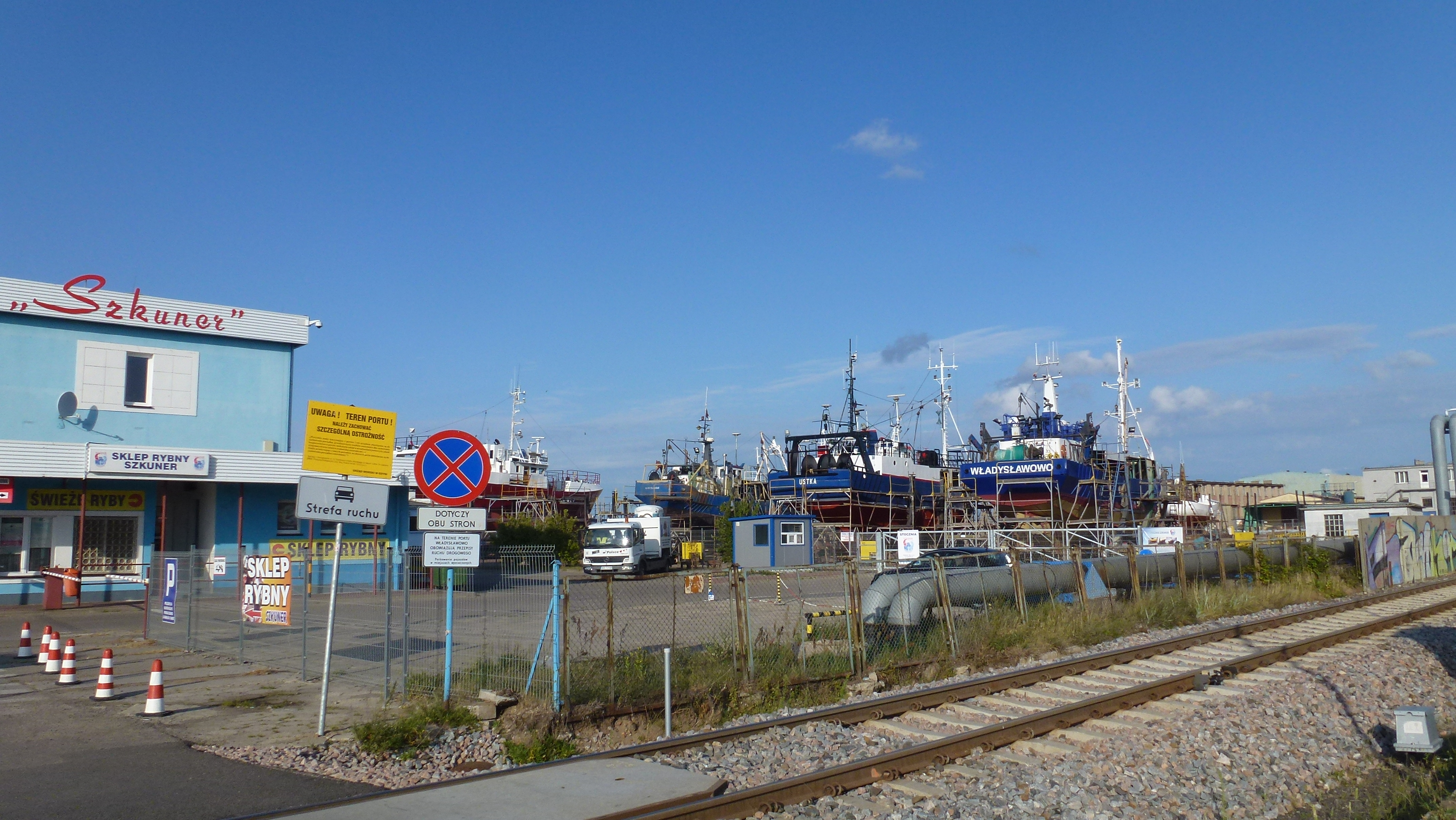
Entrance to the port

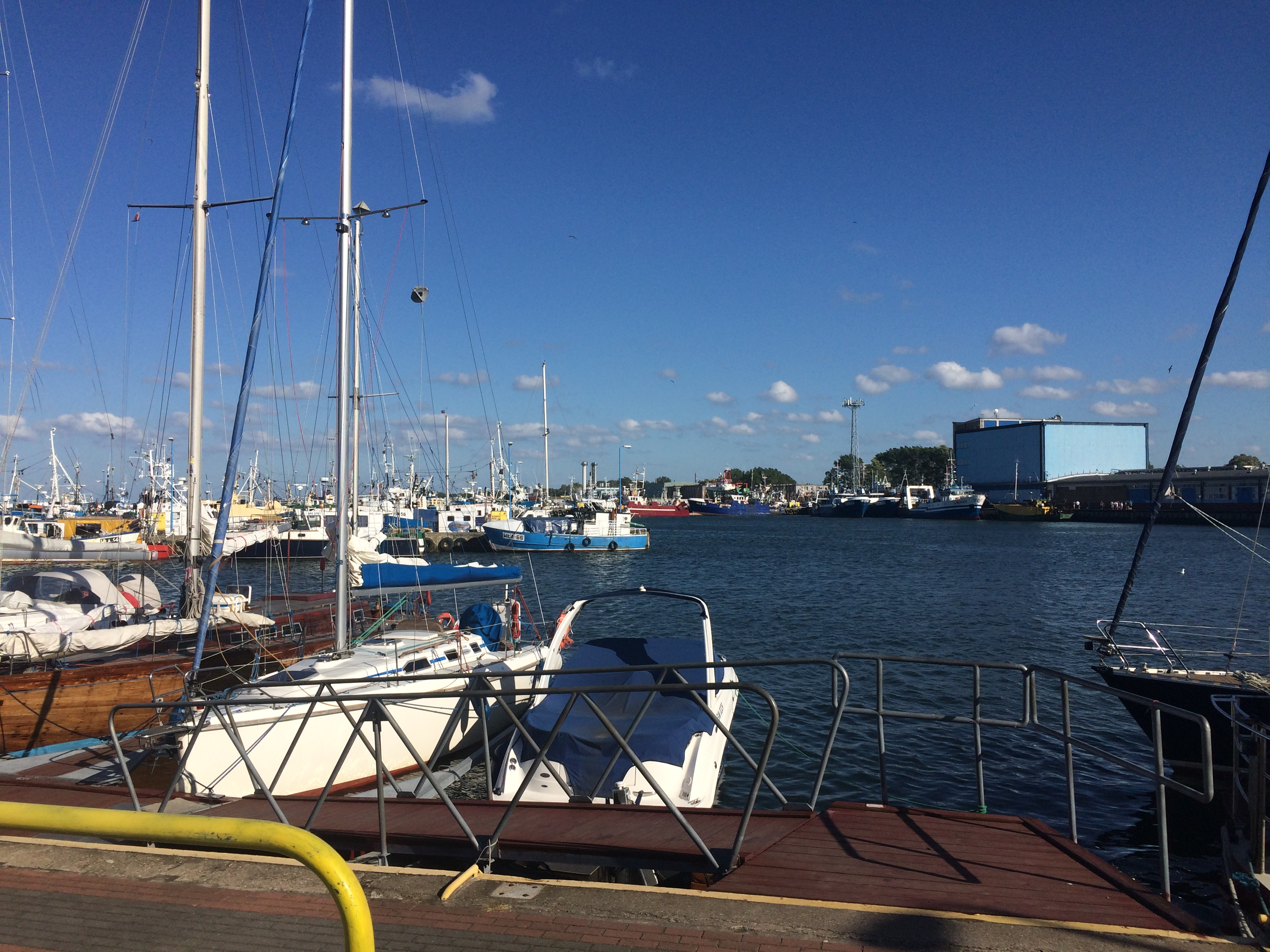

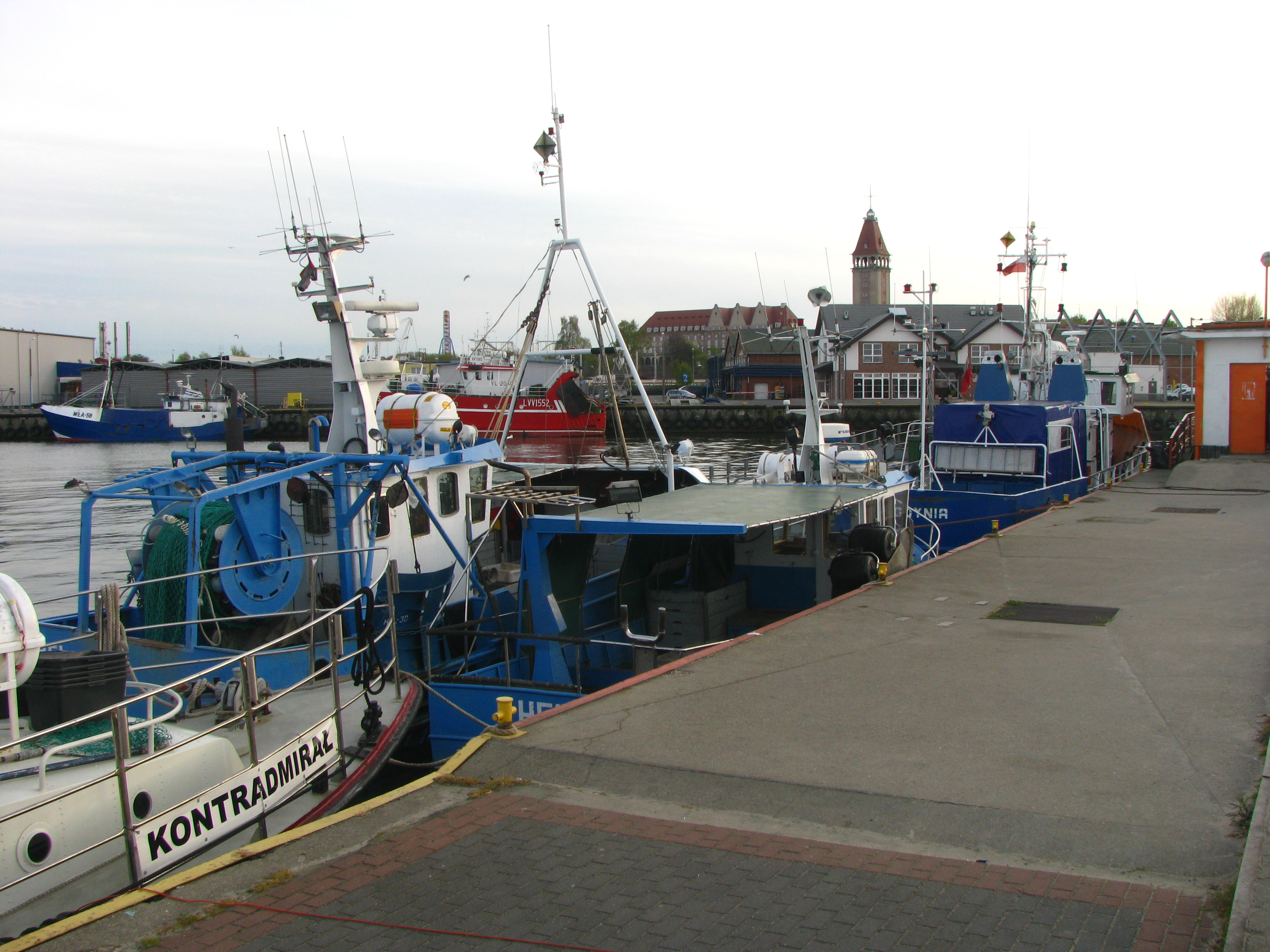

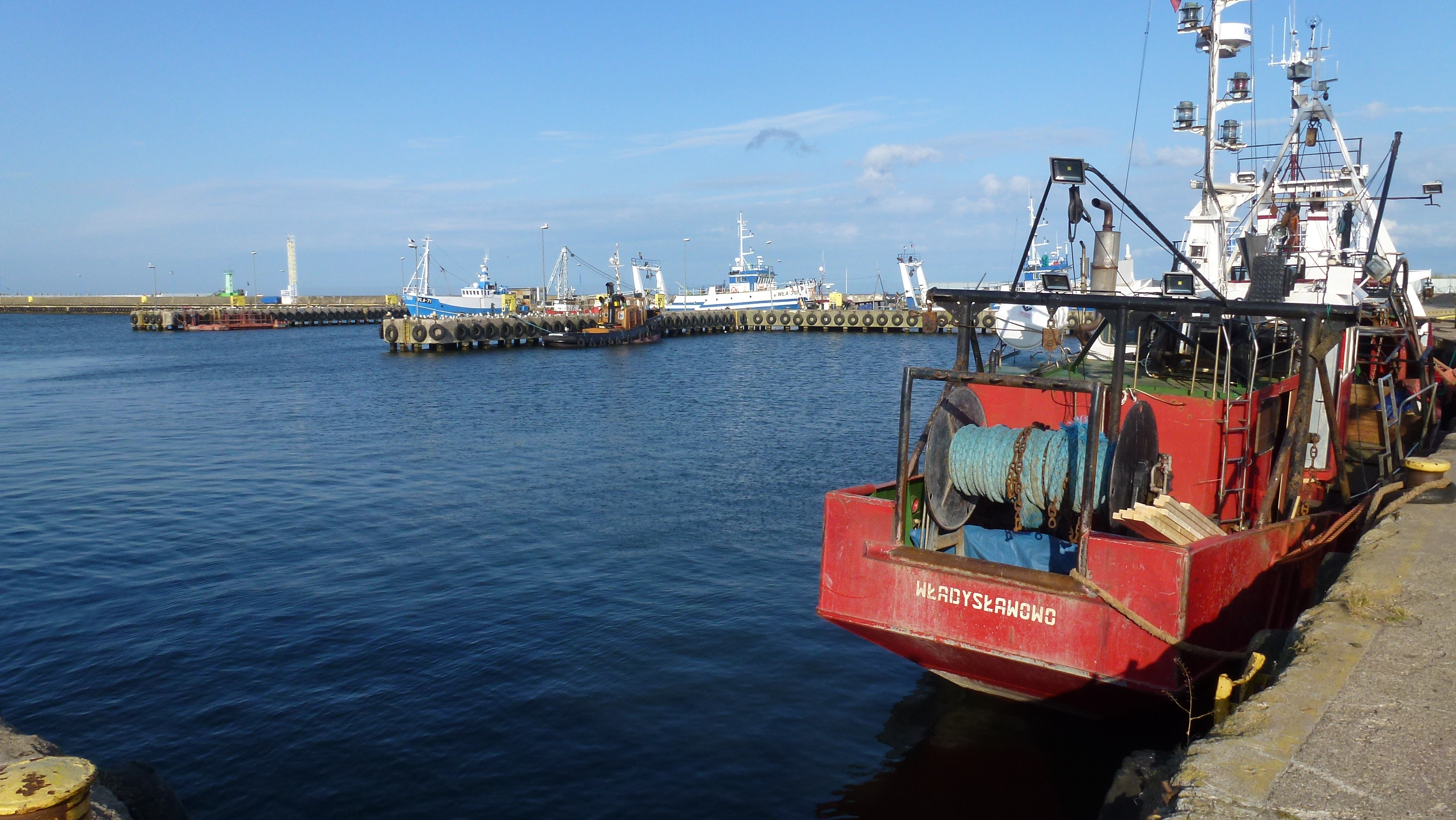

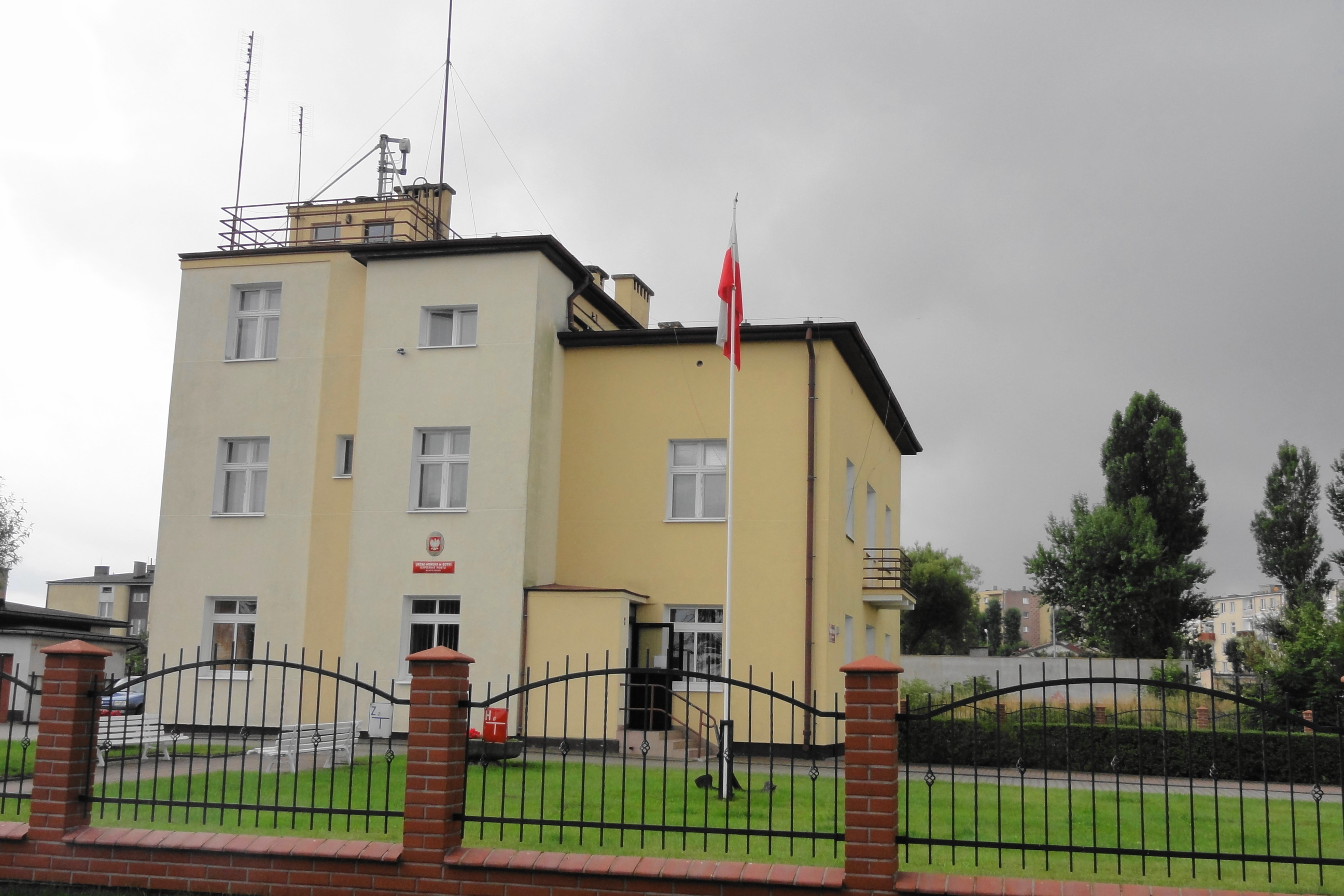
Harbour master's office

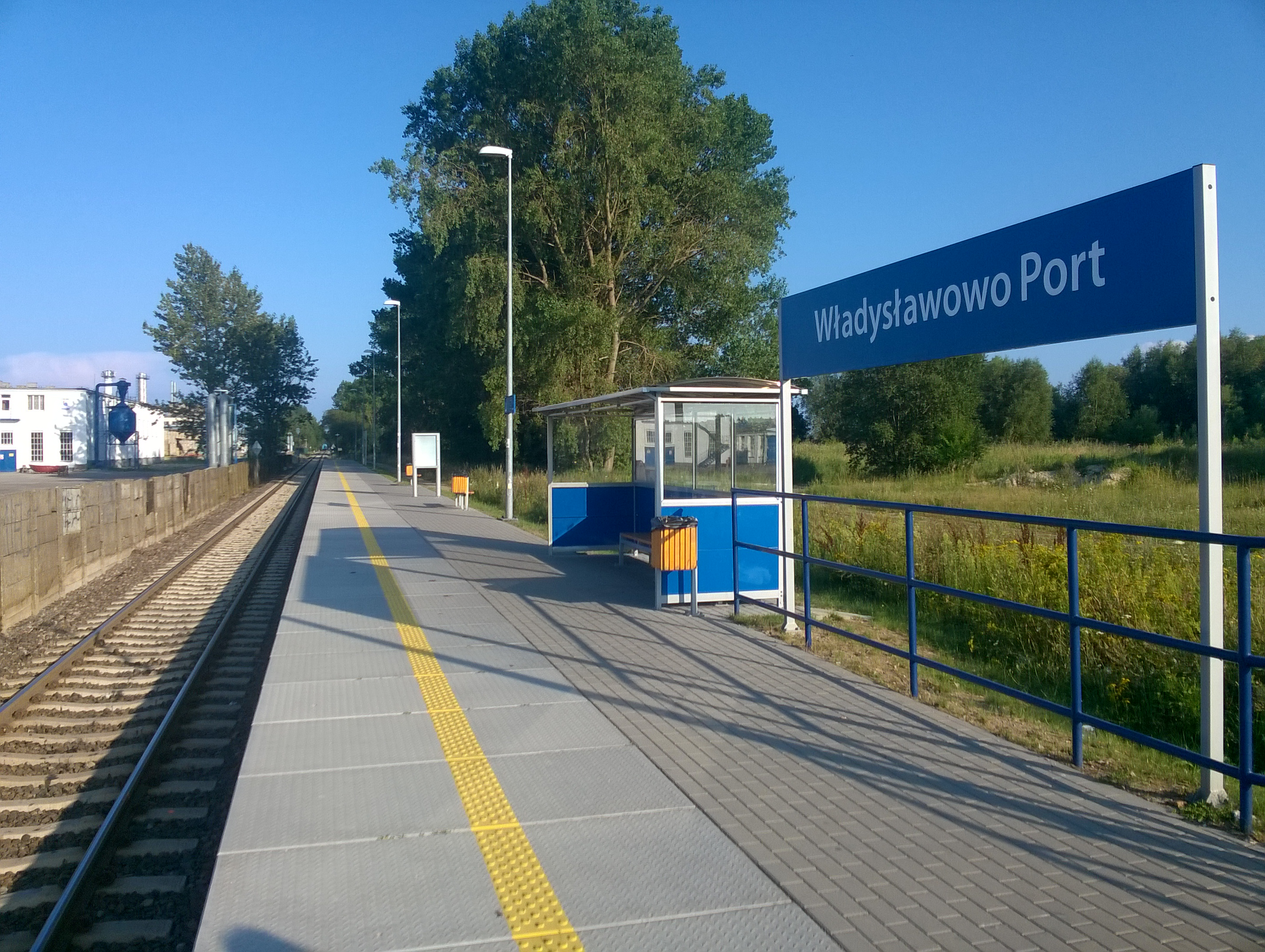
Władysławowo Port railway station

== See also ==
- Ports of the Baltic Sea
