= Zębowo, Pomeranian Voivodeship =

Zębowo
- Village
- Location within Poland
- Coordinates: 54°26′50″N 16°53′8″E
- Country: Poland
- Voivodeship: Pomeranian
- County: Słupsk
- Gmina: Kobylnica
- Population: 150

Zębowo [zɛmˈbɔvɔ] is a village in the administrative district of Gmina Kobylnica, within Słupsk County, Pomeranian Voivodeship, in northern Poland.

== See also ==
History of Pomerania
