= Zagórki, Pomeranian Voivodeship =

Zagórki
- Village
- Location within Poland
- Coordinates: 54°20′19″N 16°55′52″E
- Country: Poland
- Voivodeship: Pomeranian
- County: Słupsk
- Gmina: Kobylnica

Zagórki [zaˈɡurki] (German: Brackenberg) is a village in the administrative district of Gmina Kobylnica, within Słupsk County, Pomeranian Voivodeship, in northern Poland.

For the history of the region, see History of Pomerania.
