= Kobylniczka =

- Village
- Location within Poland
- Coordinates: 54°26′20″N 16°59′32″E
- Country: Poland
- Voivodeship: Pomeranian
- County: Słupsk
- Gmina: Kobylnica

Kobylniczka [kɔbɨlˈnit͡ʂka] (German: Adlig Kublitz) is a village in the administrative district of Gmina Kobylnica, within Słupsk County, Pomeranian Voivodeship, in northern Poland.

For the history of the region, see History of Pomerania.
