= Bolesławice-Kolonia =

- Village
- Location within Poland
- Coordinates: 54°26′29″N 16°57′14″E
- Country: Poland
- Voivodeship: Pomeranian
- County: Słupsk
- Gmina: Kobylnica

Bolesławice-Kolonia [bɔlɛswaˈvit͡sɛ kɔˈlɔɲa] is a village in the administrative district of Gmina Kobylnica, within Słupsk County, Pomeranian Voivodeship, in northern Poland.

For the history of the region, see History of Pomerania.
