= Kozłówek, Pomeranian Voivodeship =

Kozłówek
- Settlement
- Location within Poland
- Coordinates: 54°20′15″N 16°58′4″E
- Country: Poland
- Voivodeship: Pomeranian
- County: Słupsk
- Gmina: Kobylnica

Kozłówek [kɔˈzwuvɛk] is a settlement in the administrative district of Gmina Kobylnica, within Słupsk County, Pomeranian Voivodeship, in northern Poland.

For the history of the region, see History of Pomerania.
