= Maszkowo, Pomeranian Voivodeship =

Maszkowo
- Settlement
- Location within Poland
- Coordinates: 54°22′41″N 16°59′55″E
- Country: Poland
- Voivodeship: Pomeranian
- County: Słupsk
- Gmina: Kobylnica
- Population: 7

Maszkowo [maʂˈkɔvɔ] is a settlement in the administrative district of Gmina Kobylnica, within Słupsk County, Pomeranian Voivodeship, in northern Poland.

== See also ==
- History of Pomerania
