= Kruszyna, Pomeranian Voivodeship =

Kruszyna
- Village
- Location within Poland
- Coordinates: 54°21′N 17°1′E
- Country: Poland
- Voivodeship: Pomeranian
- County: Słupsk
- Gmina: Kobylnica
- Time zone: UTC+1 (CET)
  - Summer (DST): UTC+2 (CEST)

Kruszyna [kruˈʂɨna] (German: Krussen) is a village in the administrative district of Gmina Kobylnica, within Słupsk County, Pomeranian Voivodeship, in northern Poland.
