= Otto von Kameke =

German painter

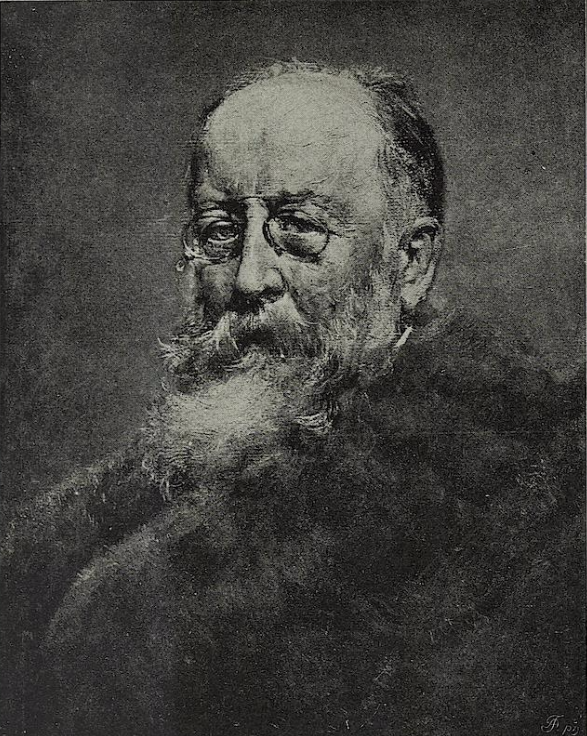
Otto von Kameke (1895), portrait by Max Koner

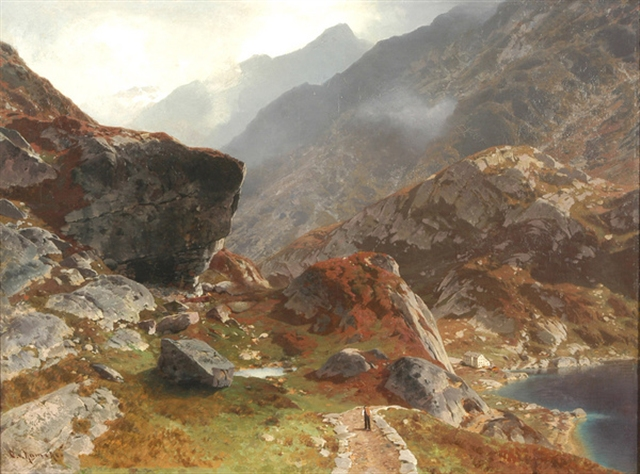
Grimsel Pass; View of the Hospice and the Lake

Otto Werner Henning von Kameke (2 February 1826 – 8 June 1899) was a German painter, a Hauptmann in the Prussian Army and a Knight in the Order of Saint John. He specialized in mountain landscapes.

== Biography ==
He was born in Stolp into an old Pomeranian family. He was the son of Rittmeister Albert von Kameke (1795–1860), who was also a Squire of Egsow and Kummerzin. Initially, he followed his father into a military career.

In 1859, he married Valeska (Wally) von Ferentheil und Gruppenberg (1836–1914), daughter of Oberst Richard von Ferentheil und Gruppenberg, who was also a Squire in Leonhardwitz and Kammelwitz.

He was already a Hauptmann when, in 1860, he decided to change careers and become an artist. After resigning his commission, he went to Italy, in the vicinity of Rome, where he spent two years studying nature. He then enrolled at the Grand-Ducal Saxon Art School, Weimar. His teachers there included Arnold Böcklin, Alexander Michelis and, later, Stanislaus von Kalckreuth, whose landscape paintings were the most influential in determining his style.

He favored high mountain areas in Upper Bavaria, Switzerland and the Tirol, but occasionally painted on the plains in Northern Germany. He was also a member of the Prussian Academy of Arts and taught landscape painting there. He mainly worked with oil on canvas.

He died in Berlin at the age of seventy-three and was buried in the Kaiser Wilhelm Memorial Cemetery. His grave has not been preserved.

== Examples of works ==
- The Matterhorn seen from above Stafelalp, Zermatt, Switzerland
- Ein Alpensee – oil on canvas, ca. 1860–1869, 66 x 95 cm
- Der Rhonegletscher – oil on canvas, 96 x 134 cm
- Alpenseelandschaft – oil on canvas laid on cardboard, 36.5 x 54.5 cm
