= Rozłęka =

- Settlement
- Location within Poland
- Coordinates: 54°22′2″N 16°49′34″E
- Country: Poland
- Voivodeship: Pomeranian
- County: Słupsk
- Gmina: Kobylnica
- Population: 5

Rozłęka [rɔˈzwɛnka] is a settlement in the administrative district of Gmina Kobylnica, within Słupsk County, Pomeranian Voivodeship, in northern Poland.

For the history of the region, see History of Pomerania.
