= Kończewo =

- Village
- Location within Poland
- Coordinates: 54°22′57″N 16°57′49″E
- Country: Poland
- Voivodeship: Pomeranian
- County: Słupsk
- Gmina: Kobylnica
- Population: 695

Kończewo [kɔɲˈt͡ʂɛvɔ] (German: Kunsow) is a village in the administrative district of Gmina Kobylnica, within Słupsk County, Pomeranian Voivodeship, in northern Poland.

For the history of the region, see History of Pomerania.
