= Ciechomice, Pomeranian Voivodeship =

Ciechomice
- Settlement
- Location within Poland
- Coordinates: 54°22′15″N 16°55′12″E
- Country: Poland
- Voivodeship: Pomeranian
- County: Słupsk
- Gmina: Kobylnica
- Population: 7

Ciechomice [t͡ɕɛxɔˈmit͡sɛ] is a settlement in the administrative district of Gmina Kobylnica, within Słupsk County, Pomeranian Voivodeship, in northern Poland.
