= Miedzno, Słupsk County =

Settlement in Pomeranian Voivodeship, Poland

Miedzno
- Settlement
- Location within Poland
- Coordinates: 54°25′31″N 16°50′4″E
- Country: Poland
- Voivodeship: Pomeranian
- County: Słupsk
- Gmina: Kobylnica
- Population: 6

Miedzno [ˈmjɛd͡znɔ] is a settlement in the administrative district of Gmina Kobylnica, within Słupsk County, Pomeranian Voivodeship, in northern Poland.

For the history of the region, see History of Pomerania.
