= Ściegnica =

- Village
- Location within Poland
- Coordinates: 54°20′N 16°51′E
- Country: Poland
- Voivodeship: Pomeranian
- County: Słupsk
- Gmina: Kobylnica

Ściegnica [ɕt͡ɕɛɡˈnit͡sa] (German: Ziegnitz) is a village in the administrative district of Gmina Kobylnica, within Słupsk County, Pomeranian Voivodeship, in northern Poland.

For the history of the region, see History of Pomerania.
