= Sierakowo-Kolonia =

- Village
- Location within Poland
- Coordinates: 54°23′43″N 16°59′12″E
- Country: Poland
- Voivodeship: Pomeranian
- County: Słupsk
- Gmina: Kobylnica

Sierakowo-Kolonia [ɕɛraˈkɔvɔ kɔˈlɔɲa] is a village in the administrative district of Gmina Kobylnica, within Słupsk County, Pomeranian Voivodeship, in northern Poland.

For the history of the region, see History of Pomerania.
