= Zębowo-Kolonia =

- Settlement
- Location within Poland
- Coordinates: 54°26′32″N 16°52′54″E
- Country: Poland
- Voivodeship: Pomeranian
- County: Słupsk
- Gmina: Kobylnica

Zębowo-Kolonia [zɛmˈbɔvɔ kɔˈlɔɲa] is a settlement in the administrative district of Gmina Kobylnica, within Słupsk County, Pomeranian Voivodeship, in northern Poland.

For the history of the region, see History of Pomerania.
