= Wrząckie =

- Settlement
- Location within Poland
- Coordinates: 54°21′36″N 16°53′37″E
- Country: Poland
- Voivodeship: Pomeranian
- County: Słupsk
- Gmina: Kobylnica

Wrząckie [ˈvʐɔnt͡skʲɛ] is a settlement in the administrative district of Gmina Kobylnica, within Słupsk County, Pomeranian Voivodeship, in northern Poland.

For the history of the region, see History of Pomerania.
