= Słonowice railway station =

Słonowice, Pomeranian Voivodeship railway station in Poland

Słonowice

General information
- Location: Słonowice; Poland
- Coordinates: 54.3836°N 16.9266°E
- Owner: Polskie Koleje Państwowe S.A.
- Line: 405: Piła Główna - Ustka Uroczysko

History
- Former names: Schlönwitz

Services
Preceding station	Polregio	Following station
Wrząca Pomorska towards Miastko, Szczecinek or Chojnice	PR	Widzino towards Słupsk
Location

Słonowice is a PKP railway station in Słonowice, Pomeranian Voivodeship, Poland.

It was originally built to serve the estate of Groß Schlönwitz, then the property of the von Blumenthal family.

== Lines crossing the station ==
Start station	End station	Line type
Piła Główna	Ustka	Passenger/Freight

== Train services ==
The station is served by the following services:

- Regional services (R) Słupsk — Miastko
- Regional services (R) Słupsk — Miastko — Szczecinek
- Regional services (R) Słupsk — Miastko — Szczecinek — Chojnice
