= Walter Neumann-Silkow =

German general during World War II

- Born: 10 April 1894; Groß Silkow, Province of Pomerania, Kingdom of Prussia, German Empire
- Died: 9 December 1941 (aged 47); Derna, Italian Libya
- Military career
- Allegiance: German Empire; Weimar Republic; Nazi Germany
- Branch: Prussian Army; Imperial German Army; Reichswehr; Army
- Service years: 1912–1941
- Rank: Generalleutnant (posthumously)
- Commands: 8th Panzer Division; 33rd Infantry Division
- Conflicts: World War I; World War II; Invasion of Poland; Battle of France; Invasion of Yugoslavia; North African Campaign; Operation Battleaxe; Operation Crusader
- Awards: Knight's Cross of the Iron Cross

Walter Hugo Reinhard Neumann-Silkow (10 April 1894 – 9 December 1941) was a German officer and general during World War II who commanded several divisions. He was a recipient of the Knight's Cross of the Iron Cross of Nazi Germany. Neumann-Silkow died of wounds on 9 December 1941 at a military hospital in Italian Libya. On 24 July 1943, he was posthumously promoted to Generalleutnant with effect from 1 February 1942 and rank seniority (RDA) from 1 December 1941.

== Awards and decorations (excerpt) ==
- Iron Cross (1914)
  - 2nd Class
  - 1st Class
- Wound Badge
  - in Black
- Honour Cross of the World War 1914/1918 with Swords
- Iron Cross (1939)
  - 2nd Class
  - 1st Class
- Mentioned in the Wehrmachtbericht on (22 June 1940)
- Knight's Cross of the Iron Cross on 5 August 1940 as Oberst and commander of 8. Schützen-Brigade

=== Wehrmachtbericht reference ===
Date	Original German Wehrmachtbericht wording	Direct English translation
Saturday, 22 June 1940	In den Kämpfen der letzten Tage haben sich durch unerschrockenen Einsatz in kühnen Einzeltaten besonders hervorgetan: der Oberst und Kommandeur einer Schützenbrigade Neumann-Silkow, der Oberleutnant und Chef einer Reiterschwadron Freiherr von Boeselager, der Leutnant Michael in einem Reiterregiment und der Leutnant Meder in einer Panzerjägerabteilung.	In the fighting in recent days, in fearless action in bold individual acts have particularly excelled: the colonel and commander of a rifle brigade Neumann-Silkow, the lieutenant and chief of a cavalry squadron Freiherr von Boeselager, the Lieutenant Michael in a cavalry regiment and the Lieutenant Meder in an anti-tank battalion.

Military offices
Preceded by General der Panzertruppe Erich Brandenberger	Commander of 8. Panzer-Division; 21 February 1941 – 26 May 1941	Succeeded by General der Panzertruppe Erich Brandenberger
Preceded by Generalmajor Hans-Karl Freiherr von Esebeck	Commander of 15. Panzer-Division; 26 May 1941 – 6 December 1941	Succeeded by Oberst Erwin Menny
