= Żelkówko =

- Village
- Location within Poland
- Coordinates: 54°20′N 17°5′E
- Country: Poland
- Voivodeship: Pomeranian
- County: Słupsk
- Gmina: Kobylnica

Żelkówko [ʐɛlˈkufkɔ] (German: Klein Silkow) is a village in the administrative district of Gmina Kobylnica, within Słupsk County, Pomeranian Voivodeship, in northern Poland.

== See also ==
- History of Pomerania
