= Żelkowiec =

- Settlement
- Location within Poland
- Coordinates: 54°18′56″N 17°2′25″E
- Country: Poland
- Voivodeship: Pomeranian
- County: Słupsk
- Gmina: Kobylnica
- Population: 1

Żelkowiec [ʐɛlˈkɔvjɛt͡s] is a settlement in the administrative district of Gmina Kobylnica, within Słupsk County, Pomeranian Voivodeship, in northern Poland.

For the history of the region, see History of Pomerania.
