= Sebastian Kęciek =

Polish official

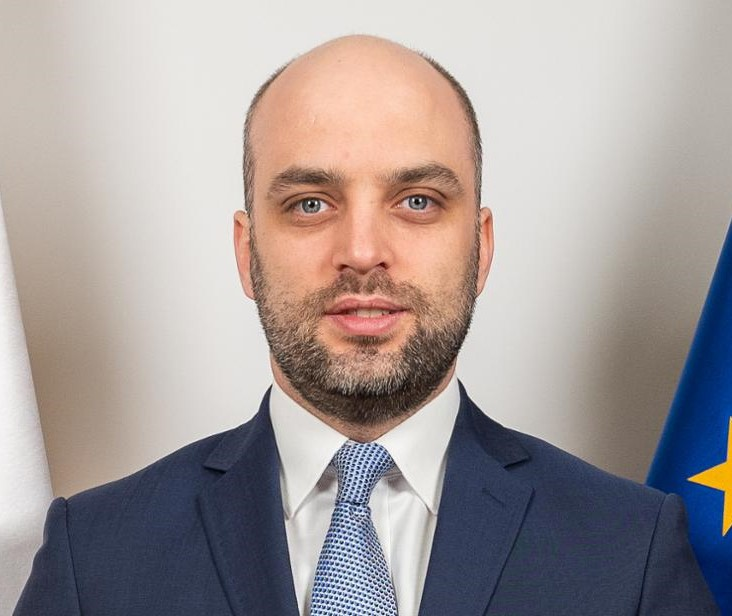

Poland Ambassador to Hungary
- In office 19 April 2022 – 2025
- Preceded by: Jerzy Snopek

Personal details
- Born: 25 June 1990 (age 36)
- Children: 2
- Education: Jagiellonian University, Jesuit University of Philosophy and Education Ignatianum

Sebastian Dominik Kęciek (born 25 June 1990) is a Polish politician. He served as Polish Ambassador to Hungary between 2022 and 2025.

== Life ==
Kęciek attended high school in Mońki. He graduated from international relations at the Jagiellonian University in Kraków. He studied also administration at the Jagiellonian University and political science at the Jesuit University of Philosophy and Education Ignatianum in Kraków. He was also trained at the IESE Business School, Spain, the European Academcy of Diplomacy, Poland and the Eötvös Loránd University in Budapest. As a student he was a member of the association Students for the Republic (Studenci dla Rzeczypospolitej). He has authored articles on politics of Hungary.

Between 2017 and 2019 he worked for the Ministry of National Education, being promoted from an expert to the head of the International Cooperation Department. On that post he was responsible for the coordination of bilateral cooperation and relations with organizations operating in Poland and abroad for the benefit of Polish diaspora. He was member of the Polish Diaspora Education Council, the Holocaust Education Council and the Polish-Ukrainian Youth Exchange Council. From 2019 to 2022 he was deputy director and director of the International Projects Coordination Department at the Chancellery of the Prime Minister of Poland covering issues of foreign policy analysis, public and cultural diplomacy, providing services to foreign journalists and stakeholders.

On 17 March 2022, Kęciek was nominated to be the ambassador to Hungary, and was subsequently presented with his letter of credence on 19 April 2022. He ended his term in 2025. Next, he became deputy director of the Foreign Policy Bureau of the Chancellery of the President of the Republic of Poland.

He is married, father to a son and a daughter.
