= Zajączkowo, Słupsk County =

Zajączkowo
- Village
- Location within Poland
- Coordinates: 54°23′N 17°0′E
- Country: Poland
- Voivodeship: Pomeranian
- County: Słupsk
- Gmina: Kobylnica

Zajączkowo [zajɔnt͡ʂˈkɔvɔ] (German: Sanskow) is a village in the administrative district of Gmina Kobylnica, within Słupsk County, Pomeranian Voivodeship, in northern Poland.

For the history of the region, see History of Pomerania.
