= Lubuń =

- Village
- Location within Poland
- Coordinates: 54°22′57″N 17°4′15″E
- Country: Poland
- Voivodeship: Pomeranian
- County: Słupsk
- Gmina: Kobylnica
- Population: 230

Lubuń [ˈlubuɲ] (German: Labuhn) is a village in the administrative district of Gmina Kobylnica, within Słupsk County, Pomeranian Voivodeship, in northern Poland.

For the history of the region, see History of Pomerania.
