= Gmina Kobylnica =

Gmina Kobylnica Kobylnica Commune
- Gmina
- Coat of arms

- location of Gmina Kobylnica in Poland
- Coordinates (Kobylnica): 54°26′30″N 17°0′1″E
- Country: Poland
- Voivodeship: Pomeranian
- County: Słupsk County
- Seat: Kobylnica

Area
  - Total: 244.95 km^{2} (94.58 sq mi)

Population (2014)
  - Total: 11,302
  - Density: 46.140/km^{2} (119.50/sq mi)
- Website: http://www.kobylnica.pl

Gmina Kobylnica is a rural gmina (administrative district) in Słupsk County, Pomeranian Voivodeship, northern Poland. Its seat is the village of Kobylnica, located about 4 kilometres (2 mi) south-west of Słupsk and 107 km (66 mi) west of the regional capital Gdańsk.

The gmina covers an area of 244.95 square kilometres (94.6 sq mi), and as of 2014 its total population was 11 302.

The gmina contains part of the protected area called Słupia Valley Landscape Park.

== Villages ==
Gmina Kobylnica contains the villages and settlements of Bolesławice, Bolesławice-Kolonia, Bzowo, Ciechomice, Dobrzęcino, Giełdoń, Kczewo, Kobylnica, Kobylniczka, Komiłowo, Komorczyn, Kończewo, Kozłówek, Kruszyna, Kuleszewo, Kwakowo, Łosino, Lubuń, Luleminko, Lulemino, Maszkowo, Miedzno, Otok, Płaszewo, Reblinko, Reblino, Rozłęka, Runowo Sławieńskie, Runowo-Kolonia, Ściegnica, Sierakowo Słupskie, Sierakowo-Kolonia, Słonowice, Słonowiczki, Sycewice, Widzino, Wrząca, Wrząckie, Zagórki, Zajączkowo, Zbyszewo, Zębowo, Zębowo-Kolonia, Żelki, Żelkowiec and Żelkówko.

== Neighbouring gminas ==
Gmina Kobylnica is bordered by the city of Słupsk and by the gminas of Dębnica Kaszubska, Kępice, Postomino, Sławno, Słupsk and Trzebielino.
