= Karścino =

- Village
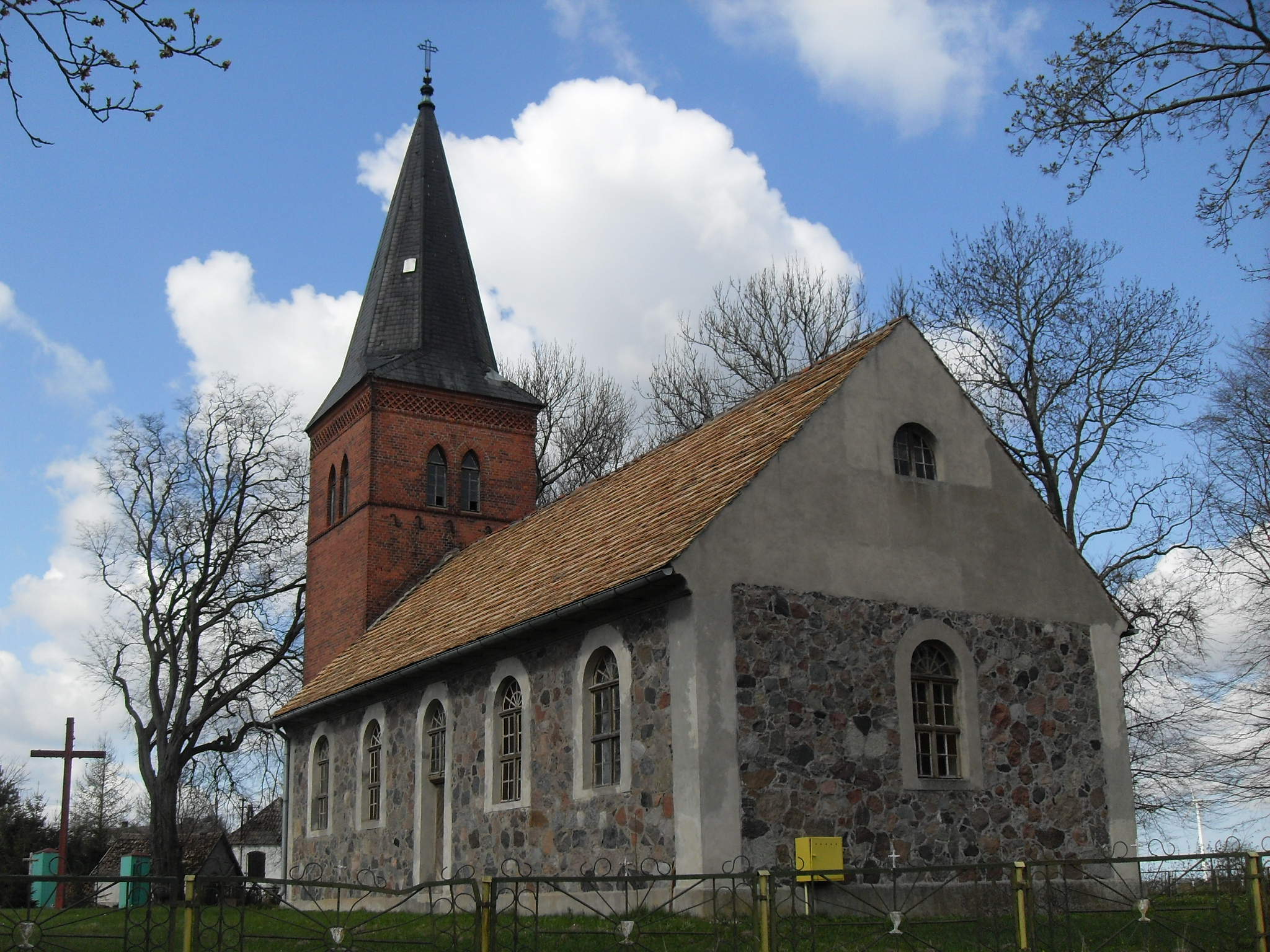
- Our Lady of Częstochowa church in Karścino

- Location within Poland
- Coordinates: 54°3′N 15°47′E
- Country: Poland
- Voivodeship: West Pomeranian
- County: Białogard
- Gmina: Karlino
- Population: 372
- Time zone: UTC+1 (CET)
  - Summer (DST): UTC+2 (CEST)
- Vehicle registration: ZBI

Karścino [karɕˈt͡ɕinɔ] is a village in the administrative district of Gmina Karlino, within Białogard County, West Pomeranian Voivodeship, in north-western Poland. It lies approximately 7 km (4 mi) west of Karlino, 15 km (9 mi) north-west of Białogard, and 106 km (66 mi) north-east of the regional capital Szczecin.

It is located in the historic region of Pomerania.

The village has a population of 372 (2007).

The 90-megawatt Karścino Wind Farm is located nearby.
