= Kurt Deppert =

Dr. Kurt Deppert
- Born: September 20, 1926; Frankfurt am Main, Germany
- Died: May 26, 1994 (aged 67); Frankfurt am Main, Germany
- Education: University of Frankfurt
- Occupation: Classical archaeology
- Spouse: Barbara Deppert-Lippitz (m. 1972)

Kurt Deppert (20 September 1926 – 26 May 1994) was a German classical archaeologist and dealer in antiquities.

== Early life ==
Josef Kurt Deppert was born in 1926 in Frankfurt am Main, the only son of Master-artisan Josef Deppert and his wife Eva (née Kilian). He grew up in the inner-city of Frankfurt.

Deppert studied classical archeology at the University of Frankfurt, and received his doctorate in 1955. His dissertation was entitled Die rotfigurigen faliskischen Vasen (The Red-figure Faliscan vases).

== Career ==
After his studies he opened an antiques dealership specialising on the authentification and sale of Ancient Greek pottery: Kunsthandlung Dr. Kurt Deppert (Art dealership Dr. Kurt Deppert).

Alongside his private venture he catalogued and published the greater part of Greek vases and amphorae in Frankfurt. Notably he is the author of three volumes of the Corpus Vasorum Antiquorum.

Throughout a number of years Deppert maintained a correspondence with the renowned Scottish art historian and archeologist Sir John Beazley. The letters were later donated to the archive of the Greek and Roman department of the Metropolitan Museum by his widow.

== Personal life ==
In 1972 he married the archeologist Barbara Deppert-Lippitz (1939–2023). They had one son.

== Publications (selection) ==
- Die rotfigurigen faliskischen Vasen. Dissertation Frankfurt am Main 1955 (maschinenschriftlich).
- Corpus Vasorum Antiquorum Deutschland
  - Band 25: Frankfurt 1. C. H. Beck, München 1964.
  - Band 30: Frankfurt 2. C. H. Beck, München 1968.
  - Band 50: Frankfurt 3. C. H. Beck, München 1982, ISBN 3-406-07650-5
- Frühe griechische Vasen in Frankfurt am Main (= Bildheftchen des Frankfurter Museum für Vor- und Frühgeschichte, Heft 5). Museum für Vor- und Frühgeschichte, Frankfurt am Main 1966.
- Die attische Vasen des 6. und 5. Jahrhunderts in Frankfurt am Main (= Bildheftchen des Frankfurter Museum für Vor- und Frühgeschichte, Heft 6). Museum für Vor- und Frühgeschichte, Frankfurt am Main 1970.
- Römisches Bronzegeschirr im Museum für Vor- und Frühgeschichte zu Frankfurt am Main. (= Bildheftchen des Frankfurter Museum für Vor- und Frühgeschichte, Heft 8). Museum für Vor- und Frühgeschichte, Frankfurt am Main 1977.
