= Słonowice, Pomeranian Voivodeship =

Słonowice
- Village
- Location within Poland
- Coordinates: 54°23′18″N 16°54′18″E
- Country: Poland
- Voivodeship: Pomeranian
- County: Słupsk
- Gmina: Kobylnica

Słonowice [swɔnɔˈvit͡sɛ] (German: Groß Schlönwitz) is a village in the administrative district of Gmina Kobylnica, within Słupsk County, Pomeranian Voivodeship, in northern Poland.

== History ==
For the history of the region, see History of Pomerania.

Słonowice is served by the Słonowice (PKP station), which had been built in the 19th century to serve the estate of Groß Schlönwitz, then the property of the von Blumenthal family, who inherited it from Valeska von Krockow, wife of Herrmann von Blumenthal. During the 1930s the estate was 90% owned by Professor Albrecht von Blumenthal, 10% by his brother Robert, who resided there. The estate became an outpost of the secret education of pastors for the Nazi-opponent fraction of the united Evangelical Church of the old-Prussian Union, represented by the Confessing Church and its brethren councils, persecuted by the Nazis during the struggle of the churches.

After the Gestapo had closed the preacher seminary in Stettin-Finkenwalde in autumn 1937, in December the same year the brothers Albrecht and Robert von Blumenthal permitted its lecturer, the Protestant pastor and theologian Dietrich Bonhoeffer, to use the local vicarage as an illegal seminary (Sammelvikariat). The pastors of Groß Schlönwitz and neighbouring villages supported the education by employing and housing the students as vicars in their congregations. In summer 1939 the seminary could move to Sigurdshof, an outlying estate (Vorwerk) of von Kleist family in Wendisch Tychow. There the Gestapo shut down the seminary in March 1940.

The manor house of Groß Schlönwitz burned down by chance in 1939. The place after the war lies in Poland. It was overtaken by communists who incorporated the estate into the Sysewice Agricultural State Kombinat (German: Zitzewitz Kombinat). The Vicarage and church are still to be seen; the latter, now Catholic, contains a painting of Dietrich Bonhoeffer as a Christ-figure.
