= Wrząca Pomorska railway station =

Railway station in Pomeranian Voivodeship, Poland

Wrząca Pomorska
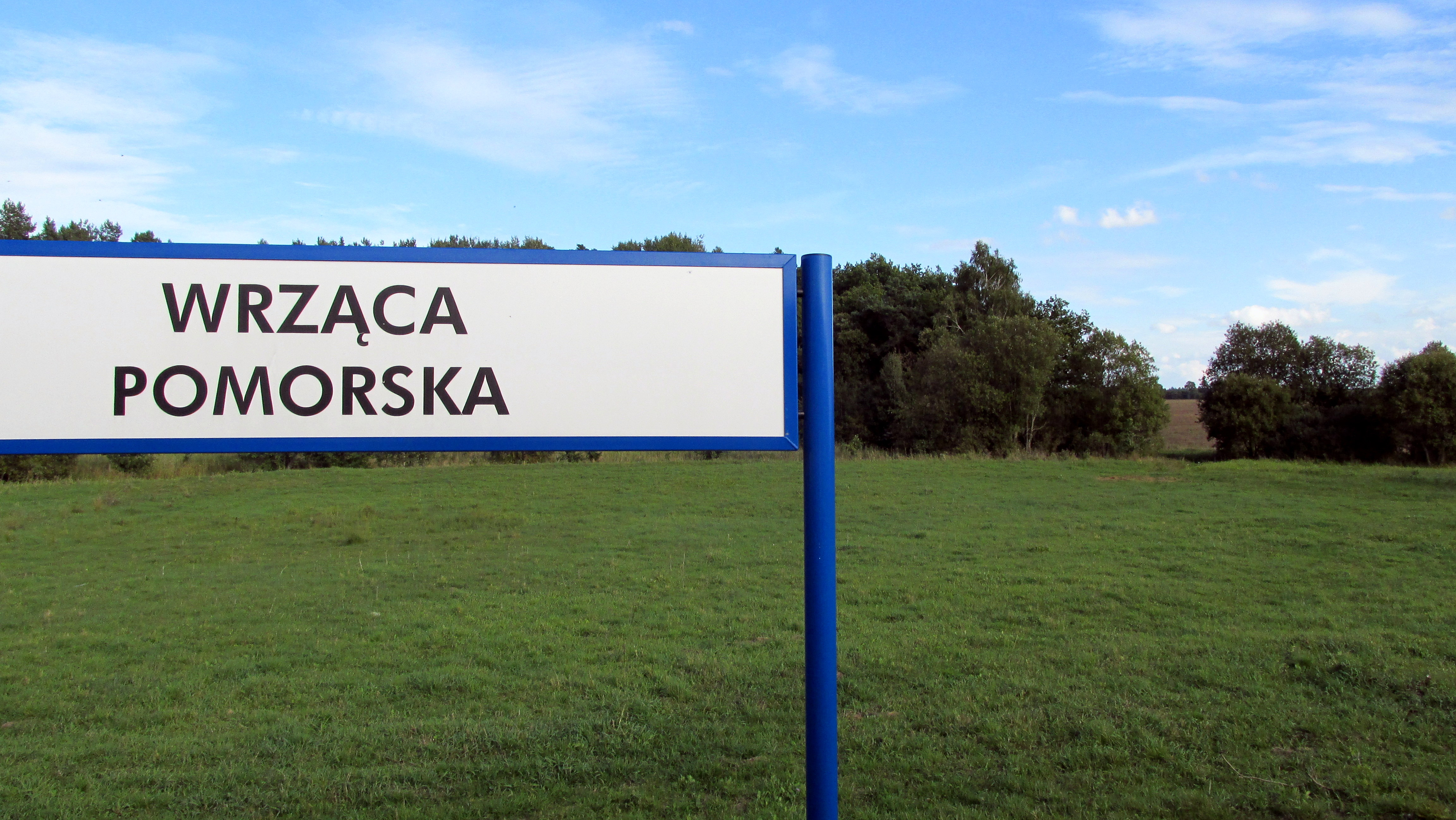

General information
- Location: Wrząca Pomorska; Poland
- Coordinates: 54.343276°N 16.917185°E
- Owner: Polskie Koleje Państwowe S.A.
- Line: 405: Piła Główna - Ustka Uroczysko

History
- Former names: Franzen

Services
Preceding station	Polregio	Following station
Korzybie towards Miastko, Szczecinek or Chojnice	PR	Słonowice towards Słupsk
Location

Wrząca Pomorska is a PKP railway station in Wrząca Pomorska (Pomeranian Voivodeship), Poland.

== Lines crossing the station ==
Start station	End station	Line type
Piła	Ustka	Passenger/Freight

== Train services ==
The station is served by the following services:

- Regional services (R) Słupsk — Miastko
- Regional services (R) Słupsk — Miastko — Szczecinek
- Regional services (R) Słupsk — Miastko — Szczecinek — Chojnice
