= Bzowo, Pomeranian Voivodeship =

Bzowo
- Village
- Location within Poland
- Coordinates: 54°21′N 16°50′E
- Country: Poland
- Voivodeship: Pomeranian
- County: Słupsk
- Gmina: Kobylnica

Bzowo [ˈbzɔvɔ] (German Besow) is a village in the administrative district of Gmina Kobylnica, within Słupsk County, Pomeranian Voivodeship, in northern Poland.
