= Tychowo, Sławno County =

Tychowo
- Village
- Location within Poland
- Coordinates: 54°21′11″N 16°47′11″E
- Country: Poland
- Voivodeship: West Pomeranian
- County: Sławno
- Gmina: Gmina Sławno

Tychowo [tɨˈxɔvɔ] (German: Wendisch Tychow until 1937, then simply Tychow) is a village in the administrative district of Gmina Sławno, within Sławno County, West Pomeranian Voivodeship, in north-western Poland. It lies approximately 7 km (4 mi) east of Sławno and 179 km (111 mi) north-east of the regional capital Szczecin.

== History ==
For the history of the region, see History of Pomerania.

Sigurdshof (today's Waszkowo), an outlying estate (Vorwerk/fołwark) became an outpost of the secret education of pastors for the Nazi-opponent fraction of the united Evangelical Church of the old-Prussian Union, represented by the Confessing Church and its brethren councils, persecuted by the Nazis during the struggle of the churches.

In summer 1939 the Ewald Graf von Kleist-Wendisch Tychow offered his unused outlying estate Sigurdshof to Dietrich Bonhoeffer, Protestant pastor and theologian and head of an underground seminary (Sammelvikariat) for training Confessing-Church pastors, for his seminary. The seminary then moved over from Groß Schlönwitz. The Gestapo forcibly shut down the seminary in March 1940.
