= Kczewo, Słupsk County =

Kczewo
- Village
- Location within Poland
- Coordinates: 54°22′N 16°52′E
- Country: Poland
- Voivodeship: Pomeranian
- County: Słupsk
- Gmina: Kobylnica

Kczewo [ˈkt͡ʂɛvɔ] is a village in the administrative district of Gmina Kobylnica, within Słupsk County, Pomeranian Voivodeship, in northern Poland.

For the history of the region, see History of Pomerania.
