= Komorczyn =

- Village
- Location within Poland
- Coordinates: 54°24′N 16°51′E
- Country: Poland
- Voivodeship: Pomeranian
- County: Słupsk
- Gmina: Kobylnica

Komorczyn [kɔˈmɔrt͡ʂɨn] (German: Kummerzin) is a village in the administrative district of Gmina Kobylnica, within Słupsk County, Pomeranian Voivodeship, in northern Poland.
