= Karścino Wind Farm =

Wind farm in Poland

Karścino wind farm
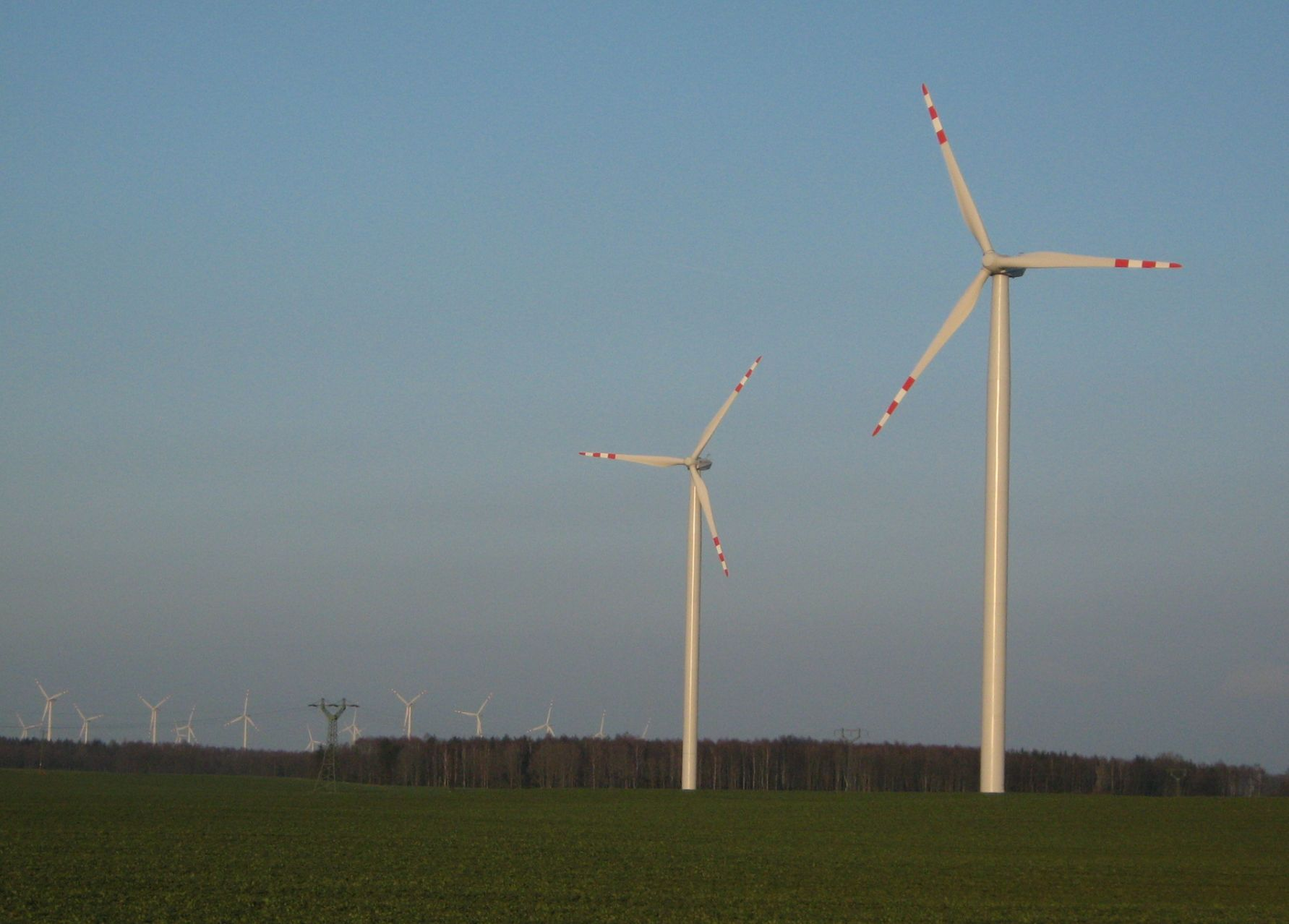
- Country: Poland
- Coordinates: 54°03′42″N 15°44′21″E

Wind farm
- Hub height: 100 metres (330 ft)
- Rotor diameter: 77 metres (253 ft)

Power generation
- Units operational: 60 × 1.5 MW
- Make and model: Fuhrländer FL MD77
- Capacity factor: 21.6%

External links
- Commons: Related media on Commons

The Karścino Wind Farm is a 90-megawatt wind farm located in the West Pomeranian Voivodeship of Poland.

== Description ==
The first phase consisted of 46 turbines, the second phase of 9 turbines, the third one of 5 turbines (60 turbines total). All the turbines are of the same type, Fuhrländer FL MD77, 1.5 MW each, so the total capacity is 90 MW.

The wind farm entered service in 2009.

It is located near the villages of Karścino, Mołtowo and Krukowo in Białogard County and Kołobrzeg County. According to the current operator, the area of the wind farm is 11 km^{2}.

According to the operator, the wind farm generates about 170 gigawatt-hours of energy per year, at a 21.6% capacity factor.

== Ownership ==
The wind farm was owned by the Spanish company Iberdrola, but on February 26, 2013 it was sold to the Polish company Energa. The transaction also included the Bystra wind farm in the Pomeranian Voivodeship and a "package of projects". Simultaneously, another Polish company Polska Grupa Energetyczna purchased other existing wind farms and projects from Iberdrola. The combined worth of both transactions was estimated at 1.1 billion PLN.
