= BC-Wind =

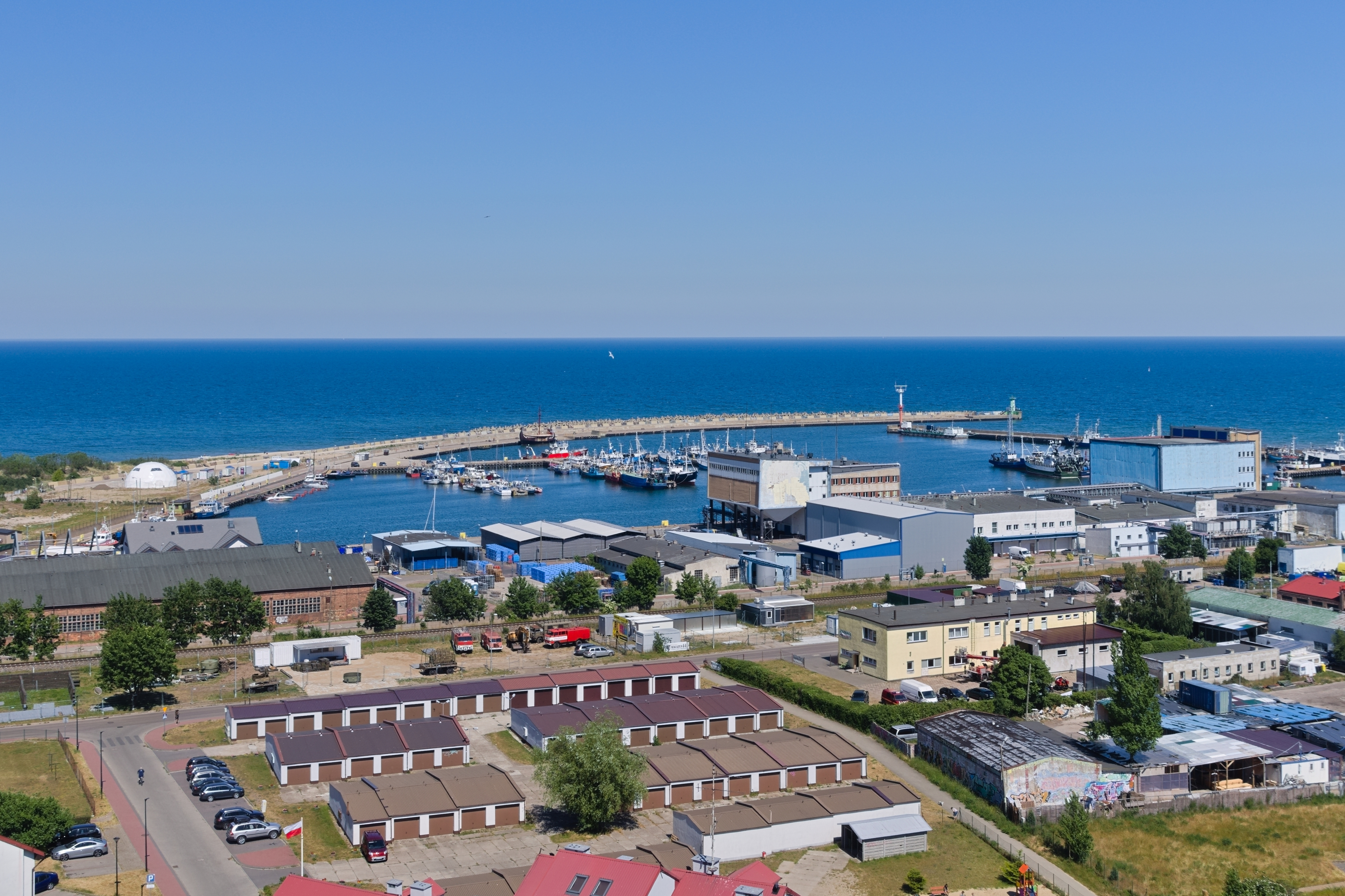
The port of Władysławowo (pictured in 2022), to be upgraded as a base for developing and servicing the wind farm.

BC-Wind is an offshore wind farm under construction off the coast of Poland. It is located in Poland's EEZ in the Baltic Sea, approximately 23 km from the coastline north of Krokowa and Choczewo municipalities. The design comprises 26 Siemens Gamesa turbines with a capacity of 390 MW. Construction was approved in 2025 as part of a project to increase Poland's energy supplies with financing from the European Investment Bank. Ocean Winds is the investor, while Polish company Ambiens Sp. z o.o. is named as the contractor.
