= Giełdoń =

- Settlement
- Location within Poland
- Coordinates: 54°21′16″N 16°56′25″E
- Country: Poland
- Voivodeship: Pomeranian
- County: Słupsk
- Gmina: Kobylnica
- Population: 9

Giełdoń [ˈɡʲɛu̯dɔɲ] is a settlement in the administrative district of Gmina Kobylnica, within Słupsk County, Pomeranian Voivodeship, in northern Poland.

For the history of the region, see History of Pomerania.
