= Kobylnica Słupska railway station =

Railway station in Pomeranian Voivodeship, Poland

Coordinates: 54.4425°N 16.9878°E

Kobylnica Słupska

General information
- Location: Kobylnica Słupska; Poland
- Owner: Polskie Koleje Państwowe S.A.
- Line: 405: Piła Główna - Ustka Uroczysko

Construction
- Structure type: Building: Yes; Depot: Never existed Water tower: Never existed

Services
Preceding station	Polregio	Following station
Widzino towards Miastko, Szczecinek or Chojnice	PR	Słupsk Terminus
Location

Kobylnica Słupska is a PKP railway station in Kobylnica Słupska (Pomeranian Voivodeship), Poland.

== Lines crossing the station ==
Start station	End station	Line type
Piła	Ustka	Passenger/Freight

== Train services ==
The station is served by the following services:

- Regional services (R) Słupsk — Miastko
- Regional services (R) Słupsk — Miastko — Szczecinek
- Regional services (R) Słupsk — Miastko — Szczecinek — Chojnice
