= Reblino =

- Village
- Location within Poland
- Coordinates: 54°25′42″N 16°54′54″E
- Country: Poland
- Voivodeship: Pomeranian
- County: Słupsk
- Gmina: Kobylnica
- Population: 420

Reblino [rɛˈblinɔ] (German: Reblin) is a village in the administrative district of Gmina Kobylnica, within Słupsk County, Pomeranian Voivodeship, in northern Poland.

For the history of the region, see History of Pomerania.
