= Wrząca, Pomeranian Voivodeship =

Wrząca
- Village
- Location within Poland
- Coordinates: 54°21′12″N 16°53′28″E
- Country: Poland
- Voivodeship: Pomeranian
- County: Słupsk
- Gmina: Kobylnica
- Population: 498

Wrząca [ˈvʐɔnt͡sa] (German: Franzen) is a village in the administrative district of Gmina Kobylnica, within Słupsk County, Pomeranian Voivodeship, in northern Poland.

For the history of the region, see History of Pomerania.
