= Łosino =

- Village
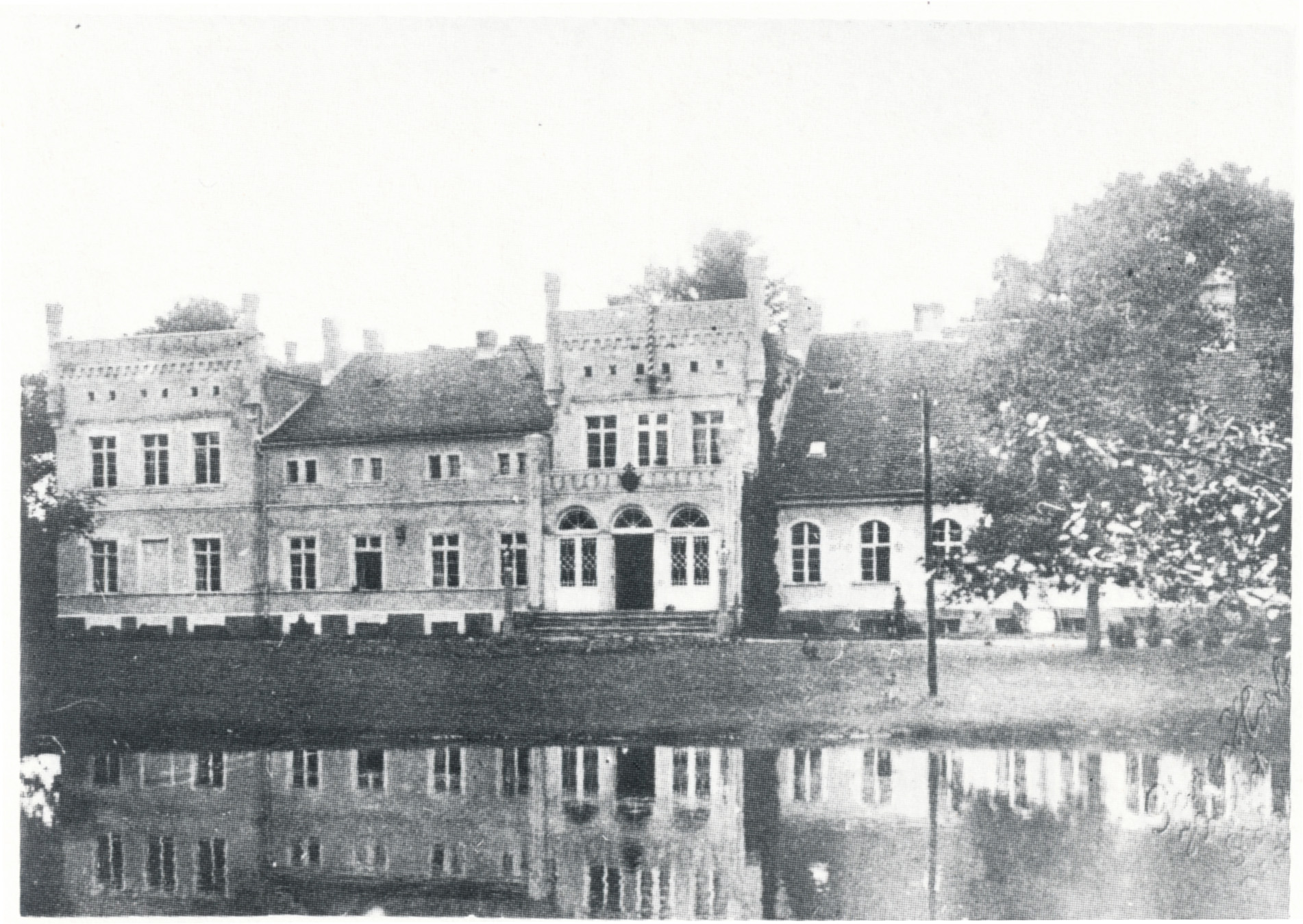
- Manour house of the Puttkamer family (1880)

- Location within Poland
- Coordinates: 54°25′N 17°1′E
- Country: Poland
- Voivodeship: Pomeranian
- County: Słupsk
- Gmina: Kobylnica

Łosino [wɔˈɕinɔ] (German Lossin) is a village in the administrative district of Gmina Kobylnica, within Słupsk County, Pomeranian Voivodeship, in northern Poland.
