= Kobylnica, Pomeranian Voivodeship =

Kobylnica
- Town
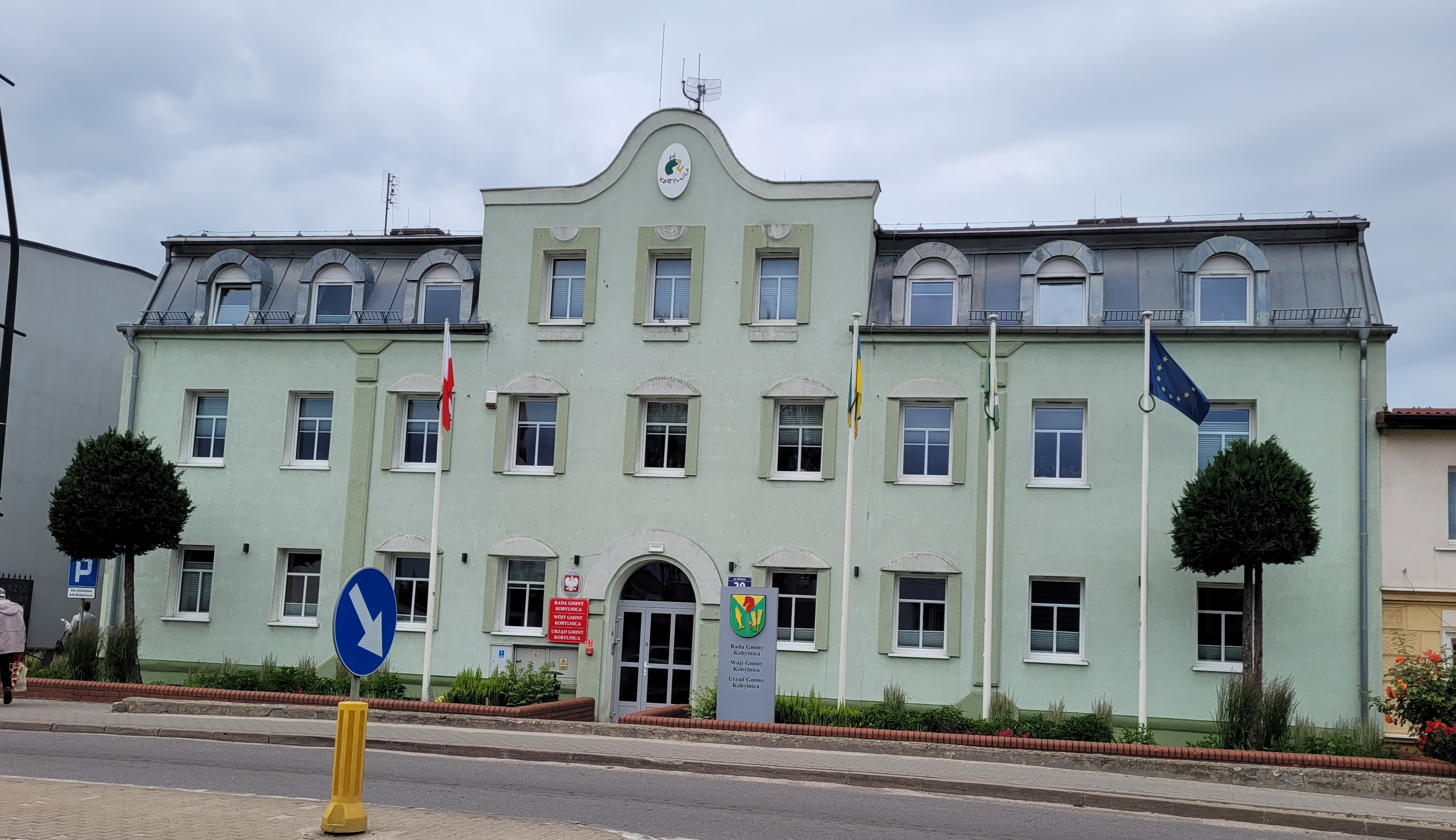
- Gmina office

- Coat of arms

- Location within Poland
- Coordinates: 54°26′30″N 17°0′1″E
- Country: Poland
- Voivodeship: Pomeranian
- County: Słupsk
- Gmina: Kobylnica
- First mentioned: 1315
- Town rights: 2025

Population
  - Total: 2,248
- Time zone: UTC+1 (CET)
  - Summer (DST): UTC+2 (CEST)
- Postal code: 76-251
- Vehicle registration: GSL

Kobylnica [kɔbɨlˈɲit͡sa] (German: Kublitz) is a town in Słupsk County, Pomeranian Voivodeship, in northern Poland. It is the seat of the gmina (administrative district) called Gmina Kobylnica.

== Etymology ==
The name of the town comes from the Polish word kobyła, which means "mare", with the suffix -nica being common for various towns and settlements in Poland.

== History ==
The territory became part of the emerging Polish state in the 10th century, and after its fragmentation into smaller duchies at various times it was ruled by dukes from the houses of Griffin, Sobiesław and Piast. From the 18th century, it formed part of Prussia, and from 1871 also of Germany. After the defeat of Germany in World War II in 1945, it passed again to Poland.

== See also ==
- The HVDC Swepol, Bruskowo Wielkie Static Inverter Plant Power station lies approximately 15 km (9 mi) from Kobylnica.
