= Widzino =

- Village
- Location within Poland
- Coordinates: 54°25′38″N 16°57′51″E
- Country: Poland
- Voivodeship: Pomeranian
- County: Słupsk
- Gmina: Kobylnica
- Population: 535

Widzino [viˈd͡ʑinɔ] (German: Veddin) is a village in the administrative district of Gmina Kobylnica, within Słupsk County, Pomeranian Voivodeship, in northern Poland.
