= Warszawa Toruńska railway station =

Railway station in Warsaw, Poland

Warszawa Toruńska
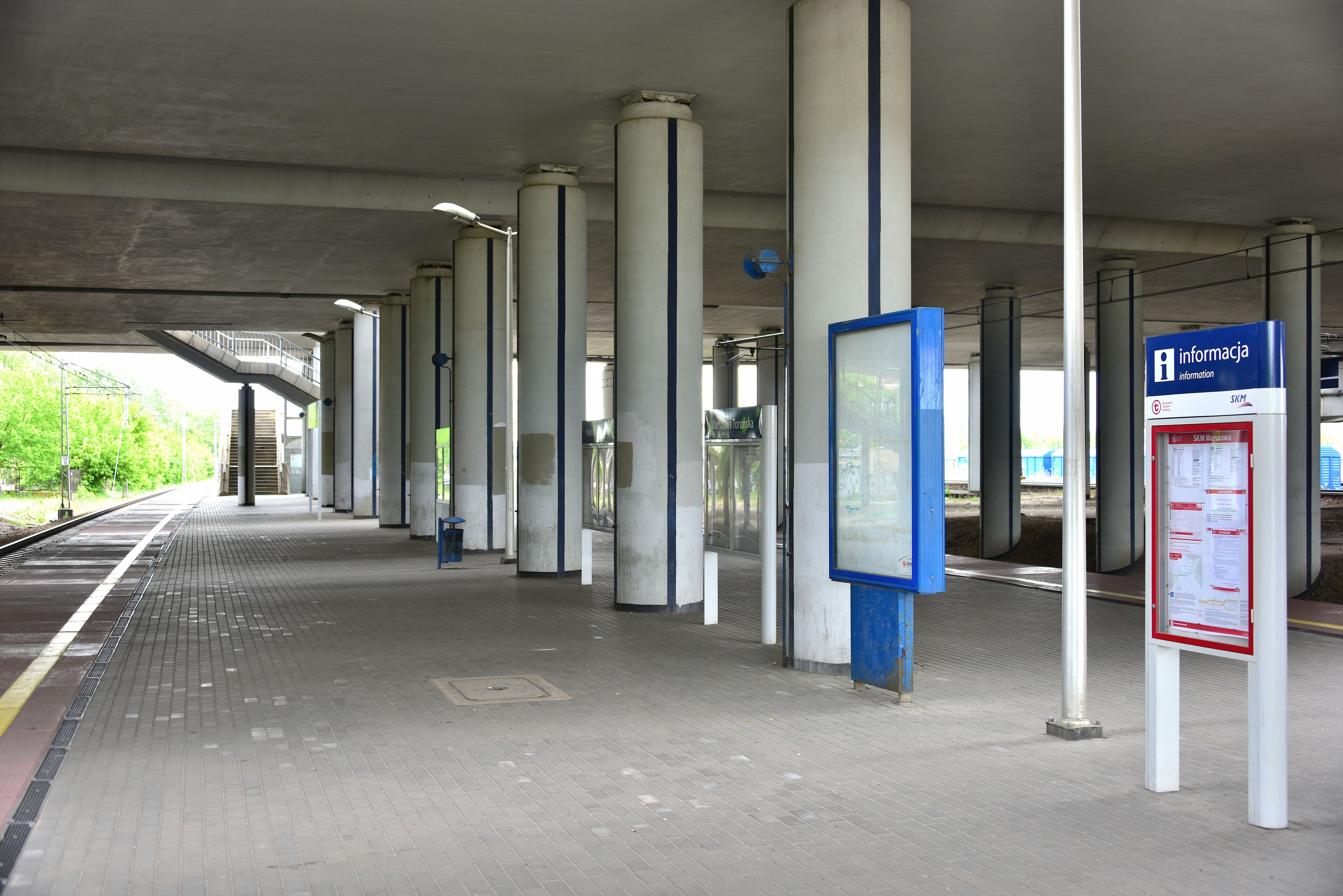

General information
- Location: Białołęka/Targówek, Warsaw, Masovian; Poland
- Coordinates: 52°17′30″N 21°00′48″E
- Owner: Polskie Koleje Państwowe S.A.
- Platforms: 1
- Tracks: 2

Construction
- Structure type: Building: No

Services
Preceding station	Masovian Railways	Following station
Warszawa Praga towards Warszawa Zachodnia	R9	Warszawa Żerań towards Działdowo
Warszawa Praga towards Warszawa Zachodnia	R90	Warszawa Żerań towards Działdowo
Warszawa Wschodnia towards Warszawa Zachodnia via Warszawa Centralna	RE9	Legionowo towards Działdowo
Warszawa ZOO towards Warszawa Zachodnia via Warszawa Gdańska	RE90	Legionowo towards Działdowo
Warszawa Targówek towards Warsaw Chopin Airport	RL	Warszawa Płudy towards Modlin
Preceding station	SKM Warsaw	Following station
Warszawa Praga towards Warsaw Chopin Airport	S3	Warszawa Żerań towards Legionowo Piaski or Radzymin
Warszawa Praga towards Piaseczno	S4	Warszawa Żerań towards Zegrze Południowe
Location
- Warszawa Toruńska located on the Warsaw Railway Junction

Warszawa Toruńska railway station is a railway station in the Białołęka and Targówek districts of Warsaw, Poland. As of 2012, it is used by Masovian Railways, who run the KM9 services from Warszawa Wola or Warszawa Zachodnia through the north of the Masovian Voivodeship to Działdowo, in the Warmian-Masurian Voivodeship via Legionowo, Nasielsk, Modlin, Ciechanów and Mława, at all of which some trains terminate, and by Rapid Urban Railway (Warsaw), who run S9 services to Wieliszew, with some trains terminating at Legionowo or Legionowo Piaski.
