= Warszawa Praga railway station =

Railway station in Warsaw, Poland

Warszawa Praga
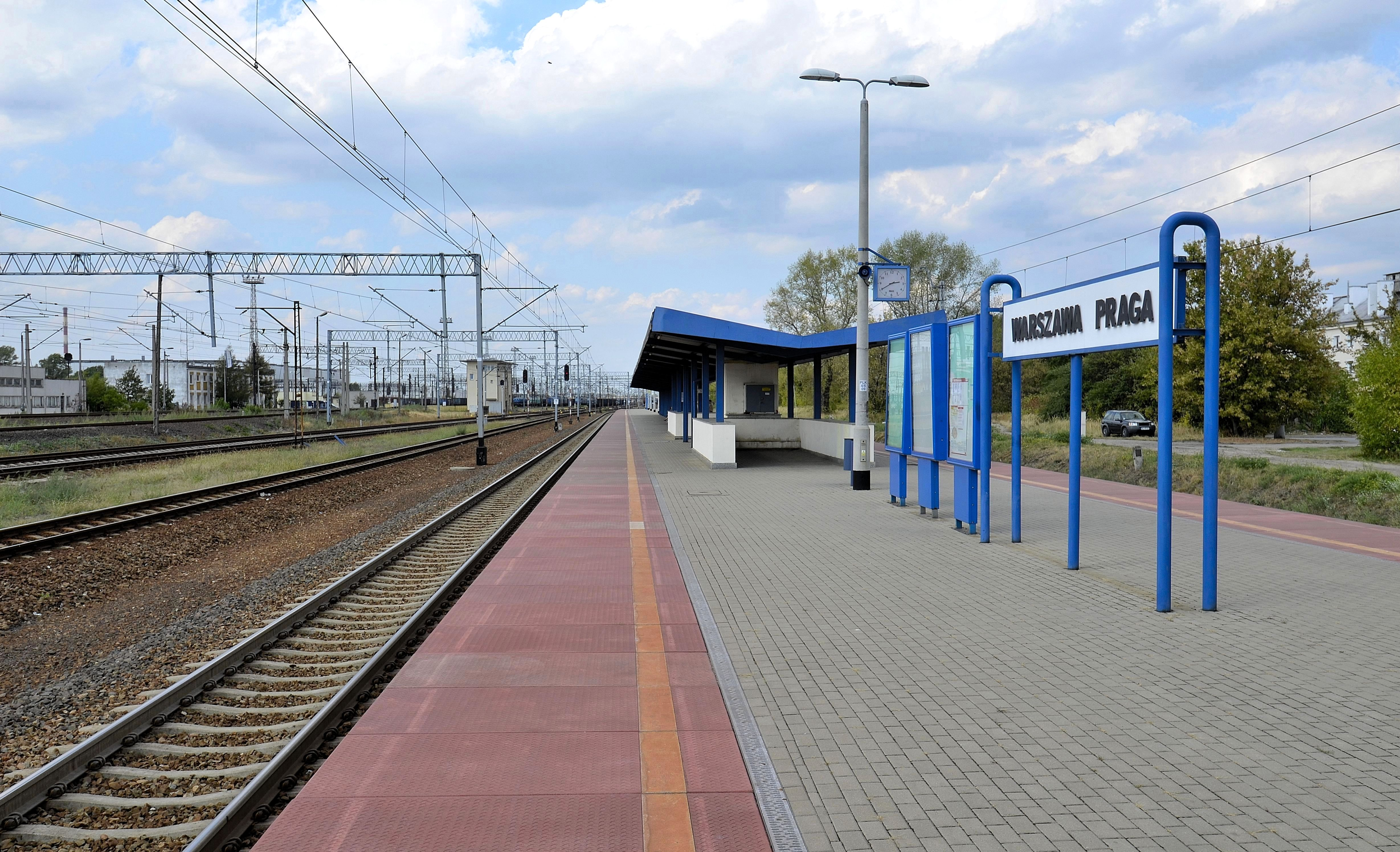

General information
- Location: Targówek, Warsaw, Masovian; Poland
- Coordinates: 52°16′33″N 21°1′23″E
- Owner: Polskie Koleje Państwowe S.A.
- Platforms: 1
- Tracks: 2

Construction
- Structure type: Building: No

Services
Preceding station	Masovian Railways	Following station
Warszawa Wschodnia towards Warszawa Zachodnia via Warszawa Śródmieście	R9	Warszawa Toruńska towards Działdowo
Warszawa ZOO towards Warszawa Zachodnia via Warszawa Gdańska	R90	Warszawa Toruńska towards Działdowo
Preceding station	SKM Warsaw	Following station
Warszawa Zoo towards Warsaw Chopin Airport	S3	Warszawa Toruńska towards Legionowo Piaski or Radzymin
Warszawa Zoo towards Piaseczno	S4	Warszawa Toruńska towards Zegrze Południowe
Location
- Warszawa Praga located on the Warsaw Railway Junction

Warszawa Praga railway station is a railway station in the Targówek district of Warsaw, Poland. As of 2011, it is used by Masovian Railways, who run the KM9 services from Warszawa Wola or Warszawa Zachodnia through the north of the Masovian Voivodeship to Działdowo, in the Warmian-Masurian Voivodeship via Legionowo, Nasielsk, Modlin, Ciechanów and Mława, at all of which some trains terminate, and by Rapid Urban Railway (Warsaw), who run services to Wieliszew, with some trains terminating at Legionowo or Legionowo Piaski.
