= Warszawa Choszczówka railway station =

Railway station in Warsaw, Poland

Warszawa Choszczówka
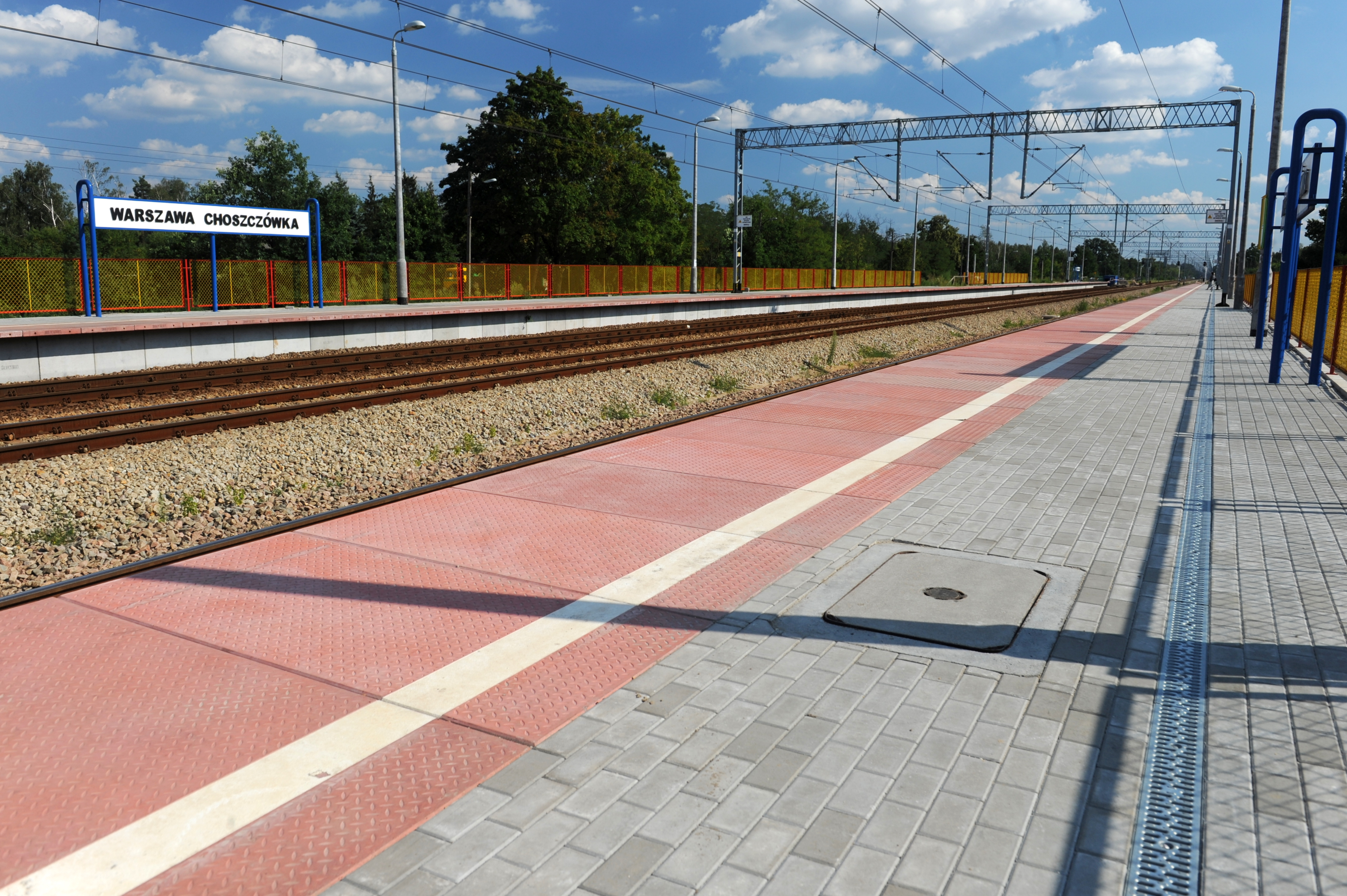

General information
- Location: Białołęka, Warsaw, Masovian; Poland
- Coordinates: 52°21′28″N 20°58′21″E
- Owner: Polskie Koleje Państwowe S.A.
- Platforms: 2
- Tracks: 2

Construction
- Structure type: Building: No

Services
Preceding station	Masovian Railways	Following station
Warszawa Płudy towards Warszawa Zachodnia	R9	Legionowo towards Działdowo
Warszawa Płudy towards Warszawa Zachodnia	R90	Legionowo towards Działdowo
Preceding station	SKM Warsaw	Following station
Warszawa Płudy towards Warsaw Chopin Airport	S3	Legionowo towards Legionowo Piaski or Radzymin
Warszawa Płudy towards Piaseczno	S4	Legionowo towards Zegrze Południowe
Location
- Warszawa Choszczówka located on the Warsaw Railway Junction

Warszawa Choszczówka railway station is a railway station in the Białołęka district of Warsaw, Poland. As of 2012, it is used by Masovian Railways, who run the KM9 services from Warszawa Wola or Warszawa Zachodnia through the north of the Masovian Voivodeship to Działdowo, in the Warmian-Masurian Voivodeship via Legionowo, Nasielsk, Modlin, Ciechanów and Mława, at all of which some trains terminate, and by Rapid Urban Railway (Warsaw), who run S9 services to Wieliszew, with some trains terminating at Legionowo or Legionowo Piaski.
