= Legionowo railway station =

Railway station in Legionowo, Poland

Legionowo
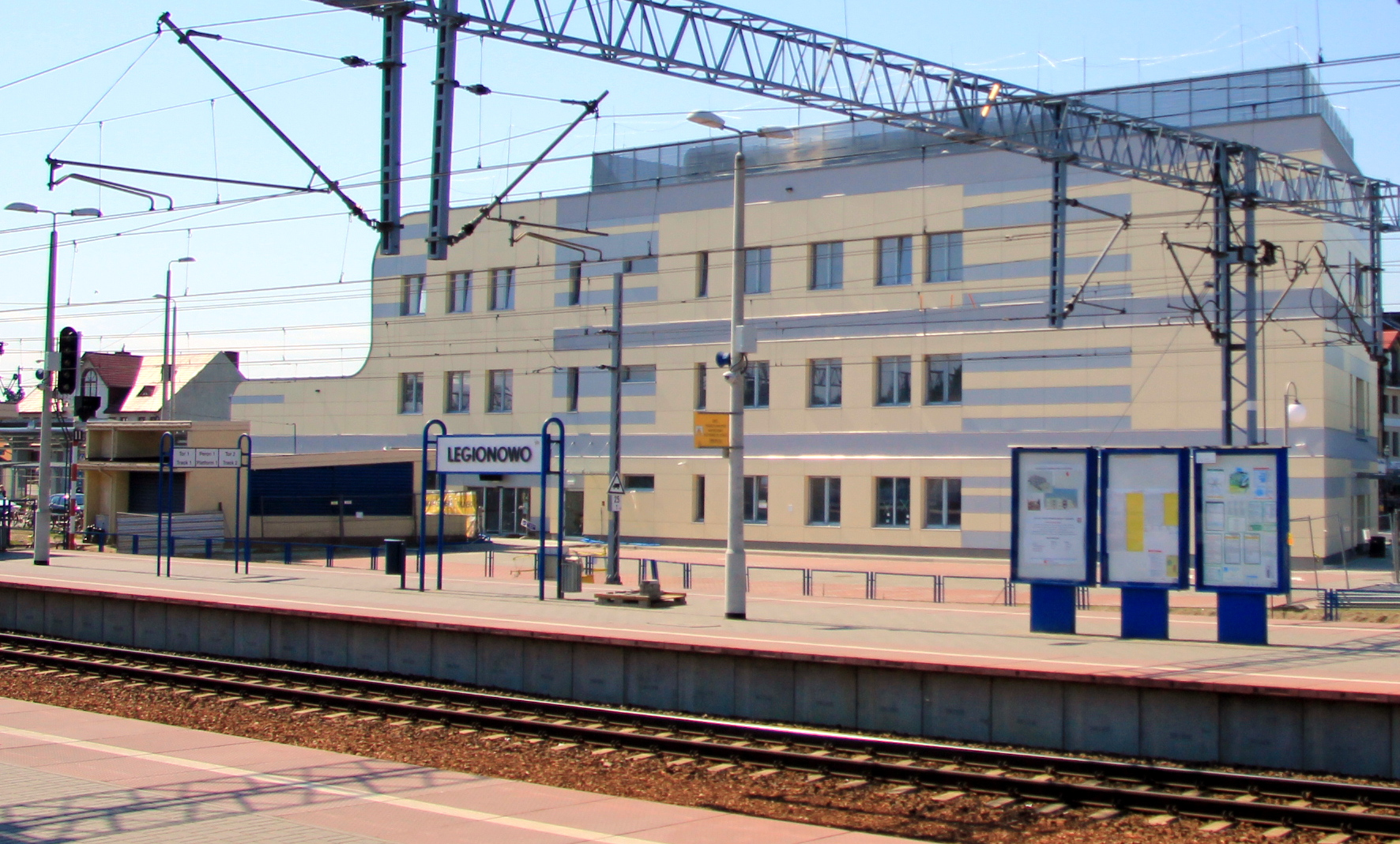

General information
- Location: Legionowo, Masovian; Poland
- Coordinates: 52°24′03.6″N 20°56′30.6″E
- Platforms: 2
- Tracks: 4

History
- Opened: 1877

Services
Preceding station	PKP Intercity	Following station
Warszawa Gdańska towards Łódź Fabryczna	IC	Nowy Dwór Mazowiecki towards Kołobrzeg
Warszawa Wschodnia towards Bielsko-Biała Główna or Racibórz	IC	Nowy Dwór Mazowiecki towards Olsztyn Główny
Warszawa Wschodnia towards Łódź Fabryczna	IC	Nowy Dwór Mazowiecki towards Olsztyn Główny
Nowy Dwór Mazowiecki towards Gdynia Główna	TLK	Warszawa Wschodnia towards Zakopane
Nowy Dwór Mazowiecki towards Kołobrzeg	TLK	Warszawa Wschodnia towards Kraków Główny
Preceding station	Masovian Railways	Following station
Warszawa Choszczówka towards Warszawa Zachodnia	R9	Legionowo Przystanek towards Działdowo
Warszawa Choszczówka towards Warszawa Zachodnia	R90	Legionowo Przystanek towards Działdowo
Warszawa Toruńska towards Warszawa Zachodnia	RE90	Nowy Dwór Mazowiecki towards Działdowo
Warszawa Płudy towards Warsaw Chopin Airport	RL	Legionowo Przystanek towards Modlin
Location
- Location within Masovian Voivodeship Location within Poland Location within Europe

Legionowo railway station is a railway station in Legionowo, Poland.

== History ==
The station was built during the construction of the Vistula Railway in 1877. The original station was burned down by the retreating russian army in 1915. The station was rebuilt in 1937. When the Germans entered the city in 1939, they did not damage the station, although they detonated it during their retreat in 1944.

Between 2008 and 2010, the platforms have been widened.

A major redevelopment of the station took place between 2014 and 2016, with a large amount of the funding coming from a Swiss Contribution. It included a transport hub, a multi-storey car park, shops, and more.

== Train services ==
As of 2011, it is served by Masovian Railways, who run the R90 services from Warszawa Zachodnia or Warszawa Gdańska to Działdowo, Rapid Urban Railway (Warsaw), who run the S3/S4/S40 services from Piaseczno to Wieliszew and by Tanie Linie Kolejowe and Intercity trains.

Przewoźnik	Linia	Trasa
SKM Warszawa	S3	Warszawa Lotnisko Chopina − Legionowo
SKM Warszawa	S4	Zegrze Południowe/Wieliszew − Legionowo – Piaseczno
SKM Warszawa	S40	Radzymin/Wieliszew − Legionowo – Piaseczno
