= Rapid Urban Railway (Warsaw) =

Transit system in Warsaw, Poland

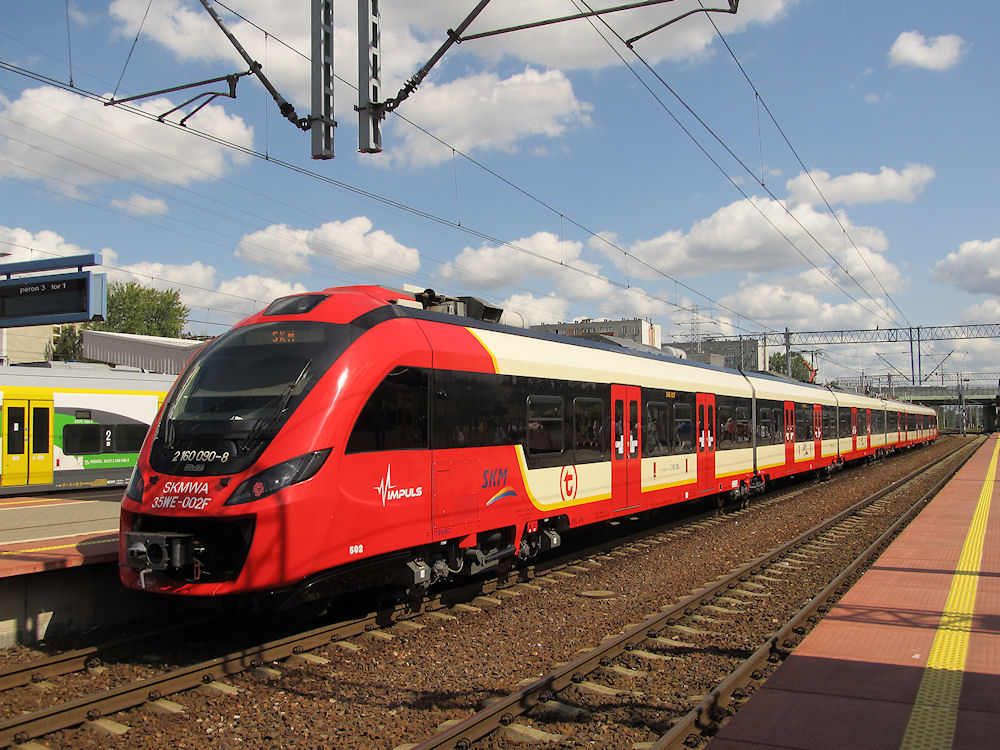

Overview
- Native name: Szybka Kolej Miejska
- Owner: Rapid Urban Railway (Warsaw) Sp. z o.o.
- Area served: Warsaw metropolitan area
- Transit type: Rapid transit and commuter rail
- Number of lines: 5
- Line number: S1, S2, S3, S4, S40
- Chief executive: Alan Beroud
- Website: skm.warszawa.pl

Operation
- Began operation: 3 October 2005
- Reporting marks: SKMWA
- Infrastructure manager: PKP PLK
- Number of vehicles: 49

Technical
- Track gauge: 1,435 mm (4 ft 8 1/2 in) standard gauge
- Electrification: 3 kV DC

The Rapid Urban Railway (Polish: Szybka Kolej Miejska; SKM) is a mixed rapid transit and commuter rail (S-Bahn) system in the Warsaw metropolitan area, operated by the city owned company Szybka Kolej Miejska Sp. z o.o. under the management of Public Transport Authority in Warsaw on shared, general railway lines managed by the PKP Polskie Linie Kolejowe.

== History ==
The earliest attempts to implement an electrified suburban rail system in Warsaw were made in 1936–37, when the Warsaw Railway Junction and surrounding railway lines were electrified to the national standard of 3 kV DC and high platform electric multiple units were introduced (which later came to be designated PKP class EW51).

After World War II, newer EW53, EW54 and EW55 high-platform EMUs were introduced. In 1963, Warszawa Śródmieście railway station was rebuilt into its current form as an underground city station in the city center and in 1967 the Warsaw Cross-City Line was doubled to four tracks to enable separation of suburban and long-distance trains in preparation for the opening of Warszawa Centralna railway station in 1975. The system went into steep decline from the late-1970s due to the country's serious economic problems and the martial law period. These problems persisted well into the 1990s and 2000s as the fall of communism and the country's transition to a market economy made owning private cars more affordable to the general population and as a side effect of decentralization local authorities preferred to invest in infrastructure used directly by their constituencies.

The Warsaw SKM in its current form was proposed in late-2002, stipulating to use the existing infrastructure of the Warsaw Railway Junction, especially the cross city line with its over 2 km long tunnel running under the city center and conveniently located underground station, as a cheap substitute for a badly needed second metro line whose construction did not start until 2010.

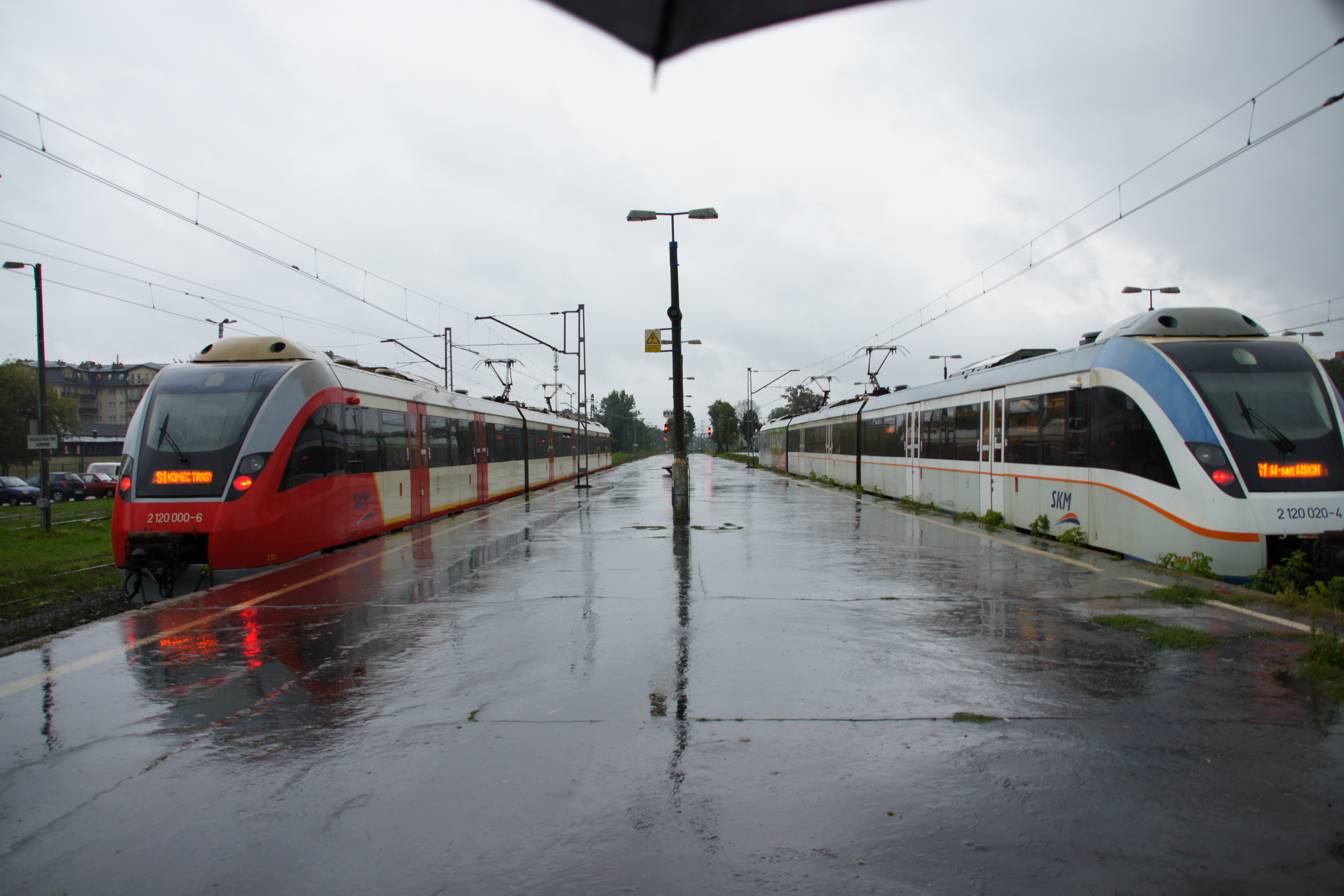
Newag 14WE EMUs in the original blue and orange livery and present-day yellow and red of Warsaw public transit

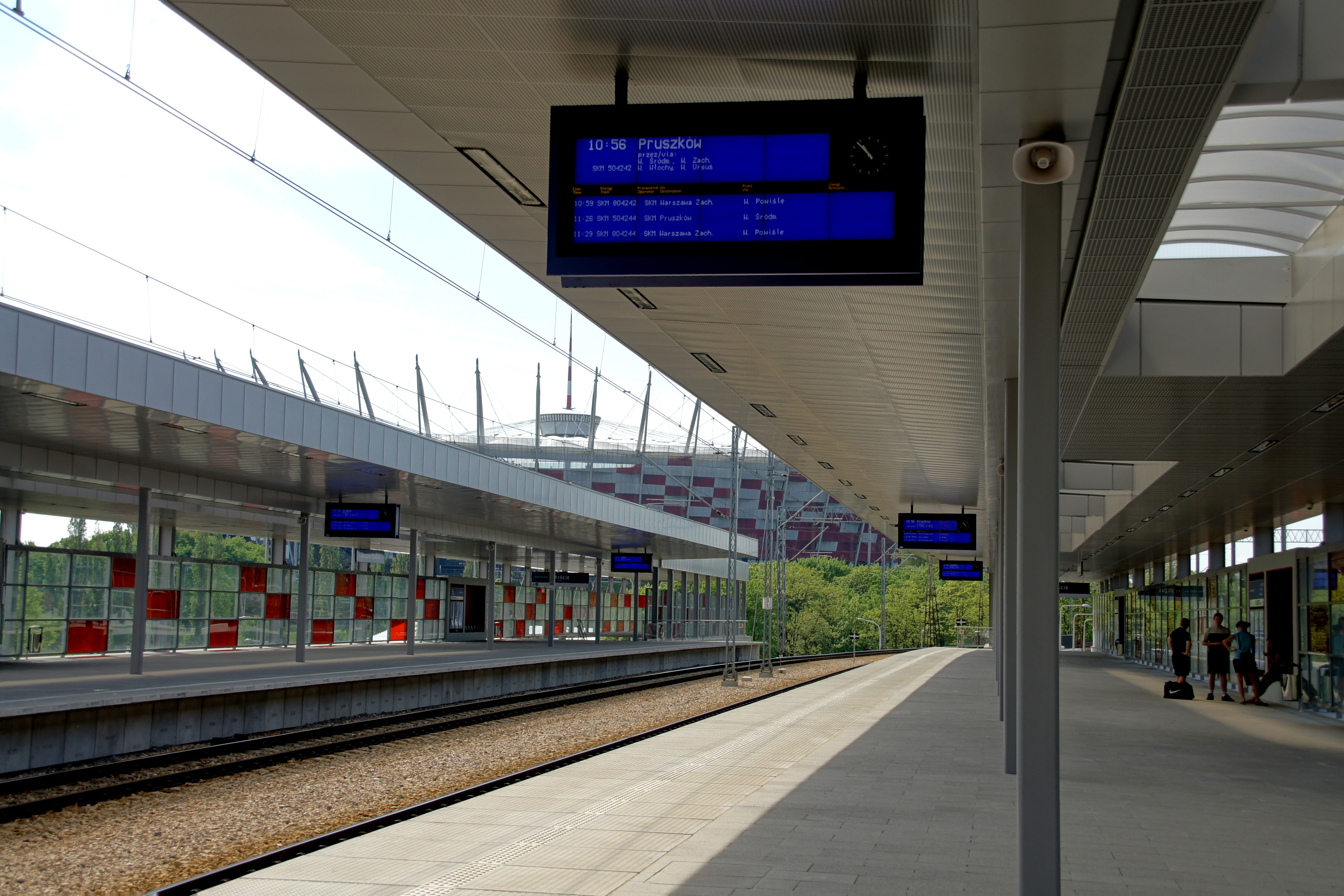
One of the stations - Warszawa Stadion

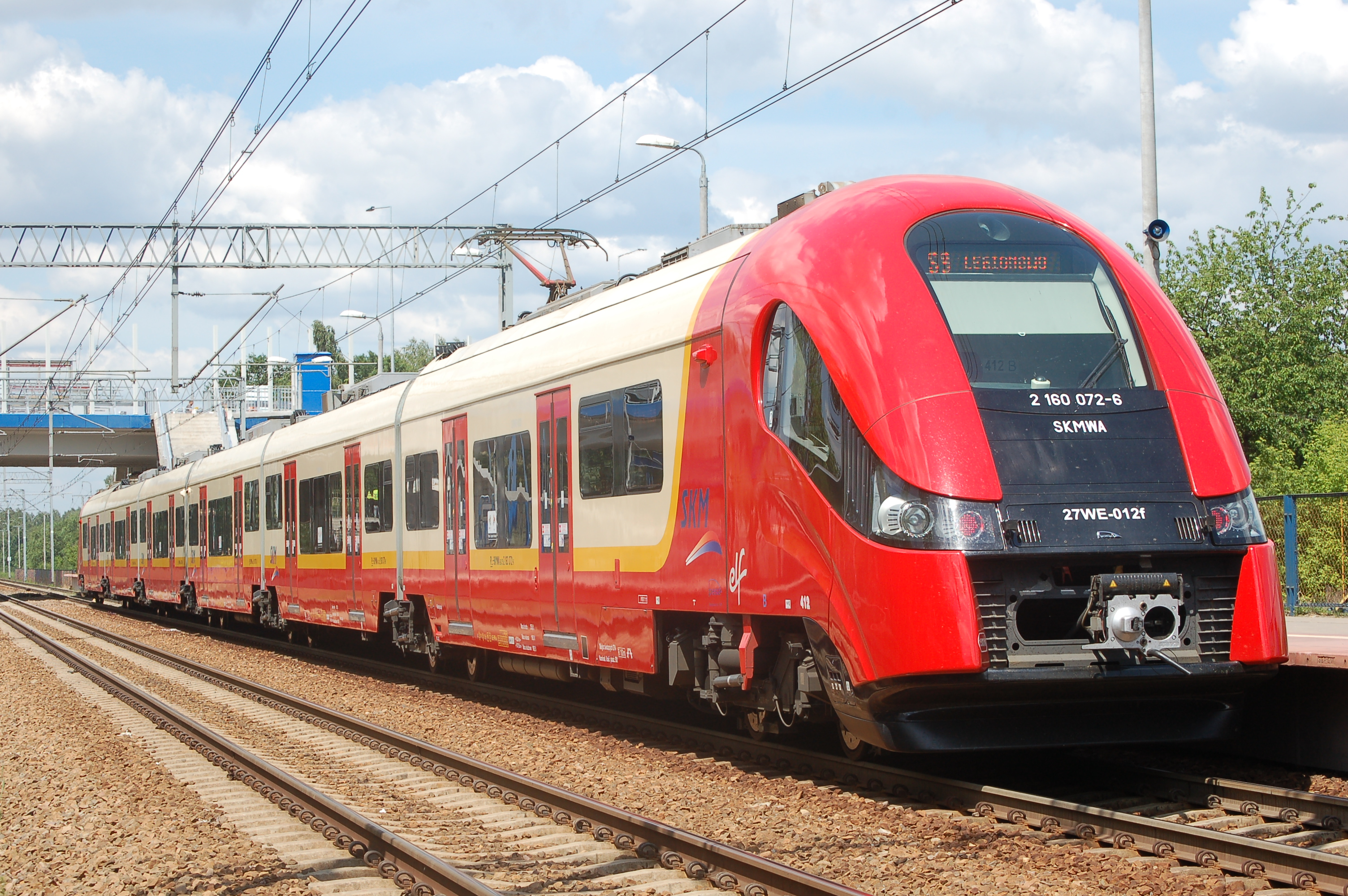
Train on S9 line

In order to implement this the then-Mayor of Warsaw Lech Kaczyński established in 2004 the municipally owned company Rapid Urban Railway (Warsaw) Sp. z o.o. The company was originally incorporated as a joint venture between the City of Warsaw with 50% shares and the companies Metro Warszawskie Sp. z o.o. with 49% shares and Tramwaje Warszawskie Sp. z. o.o. with 1% shares, both owned entirely by the city and responsible respectively for the Metro and Tram system. As such the company is notably completely independent from the national rail operator PKP Group, unlike Masovian Railways established by the Masovian Voivodeship at around the same time.

The newly formed company was equipped with six Newag 14WE EMUs which were an extensive modernization of the PKP class EN57 EMUs commonly used on regional routes at the time, with a modern looking body but retaining their original underframes.

A year and a half after being established the SKM initiated its operation with its first trains, opening a single line from Warszawa Zachodnia along the cross city line to Warszawa Wschodnia and along the Vistula river to Warszawa Falenica. The new service failed to deliver on its promise to serve as a viable replacement due to the poor state of the rail infrastructure. Passengers within the city center preferred the more accessible trams system and few people wanted to use the trains in the southeastern districts of the city. Additionally, while the integrated fare system of the Warsaw Transit Authority offered a large convenience the modern look and relative cleanness of the rolling stock sharply contrasted with the standard found in the Polish railroad; during rush hours most of the slots on the tracks were taken up by regional traffic and the new EMUs suffered from the same technical problems as the ones they were based on.

Due to the initial low popularity of the line the original concept was somewhat altered in 2006 with the line extended outside the administrative borders of the city through the Ursus district into the town of Pruszków to the west and diverted to the district of the Wesoła and the town of Sulejówek to the east, turning the service into a suburban commuter network which allowed people in the metropolitan area to quickly reach the city center and conveniently transfer within the city's public transit system. The revised formula proved to be very successful leading the city to take the purchase of all the shares of the company and purchase two more Newag 14WE EMUs. The popularity of the trains was also instrumental in the city negotiating a deal with the Masovian Voivodeship to have Masovian Railways honor long term tickets of the Warsaw Transit Authority, first along the route of the SKM and eventually within the entire area served by the city's public transit system.

In 2010 the company purchased four brand new Newag 19WE EMUs and opened a new line to the town of Otwock. Additionally, the Warsaw Transit Authority signed a contract with the Masovian Railways to operate a line between Warszawa Gdańska station on the Warsaw Circumferential Line and the town of Legionowo under the branding of the SKM, and since 2012 taken over by the company.

In 2011 13 new Pesa Elf 27WE EMUs (2011–2012) were purchased. In 2012 a new airport rail link was created running through the Służewiec office district and a newly opened 1.5 km rail tunnel to Warsaw Chopin Airport.

In 2012 the company purchased 9 six car Newag Impuls 35WE units.

In 2020 SKM has awarded Newag a contract to supply an additional 21 Impuls 2 EMUs, 6 four car versions and 15 with five cars each. The trains feature air-conditioning, a passenger information system, ticket vending machines and validators, Wi-Fi, USB sockets and an AED defibrillator.

In January 2022 Newag has delivered the first two Impuls 2 EMUs

In June 2023, the S4 line was extended to Zegrze Południowe, with two new stations: Wieliszew Centrum and Zegrze Południowe. (note: the Wieliszew Centrum station was not yet completed as of the extension's opening, but was completed later on)

== Rolling stock ==
Image	Type	Number	Description
	Newag 14WE	2 units	Introduced in 2005. The first six units were purchased with the creation of the company. Rebuilt from old PKP class EN57 and extensively modernized giving them a modern look and making them more suitable for carrying large numbers of passengers on shorter routes within the Warsaw metropolitan area. Two units out of eight originally ordered have been sold to Silesian Railways. As of 2022, SKM Warszawa operates only 2 14WE units in the fleet however, they have not run any regular service since June 2022 and are used for substitute services when regular trains break down.
	Newag 19WE	4 units	Introduced in 2010. New EMUs designed and built for the SKM
	PESA 'ELF' 27WE	13 units	Introduced in 2011. A version of the PESA ELF EMU adapted for the SKM
	Newag 35WE	9 units	Introduced in 2012
	Newag 31WEba „Impuls II”	6 units	Introduced in 2022. A four-car EMU
	Newag 45WEa „Impuls II”	15 units	Introduced in 2022. A five-car EMU

== Routes ==
As of May 2025 SKM operates 4 regular lines:

Line (Branch)		From	To
S1		Pruszków	Otwock
S2		Warszawa Lotnisko Chopina	Sulejówek Miłosna
S3		Warszawa Lotnisko Chopina	Legionowo
S4	A	Piaseczno	Zegrze Południowe
S4	B	Piaseczno	Wieliszew
S40	A	Piaseczno	Radzymin
S40	B	Piaseczno	Wieliszew

=== S1 line ===
Pruszków – Otwock

The line was established in October 2005, running from Warszawa Falenica to Warszawa Zachodnia and suspended indefinitely in July 2006 with all of the rolling stock directed to the newly created line S2. In September 2010 the line was re-established and extended towards the town of Otwock, south east of Warsaw, but only reaching Warszawa Wschodnia, which required most of the potential passengers to transfer there to trains running on the line S2 or regional trains operated by Masovian Railways to reach the city. The line was extended through Warszawa Śródmieście and Warszawa Zachodnia to Pruszków in December 2010.

=== S2 line ===
Warsaw Chopin Airport – Sulejówek Miłosna

The line was established in July 2006 running from Pruszków through Warszawa Śródmieście to Sulejówek Miłosna. In December 2010 the line was shortened to Warszawa Zachodnia in the West, with the line S1 taking over the route from Pruszków to Warszawa Zachodnia and further to Warszawa Śródmieście. In June 2012 the line was extended from Warszawa Zachodnia through the Służewiec office district and a newly opened rail tunnel to an underground station at the Warsaw Chopin Airport. The route assumed its current form on 12 March 2023 due to modernization works at Warszawa Zachodnia station and the Warsaw Cross-City Line.

=== S3 line ===
Warsaw Chopin Airport – Legionowo Piaski / Radzymin

The line was established in June 2012 connecting the Warsaw Frédéric Chopin Airport through the city center with the town of Legionowo north east of Warsaw. S3 line terminates at Radzymin when operating as a full-length A service or earlier at Legionowo Piaski station if operates a B variant route.

=== S4 line ===
Piaseczno – Wieliszew

Line started running on 12 March 2023. It connects city of Piaseczno in south-west with Wieliszew in north-east, running through Warsaw and crossing the Vistula by northern railway bridge. Large stations it stops at are Warszawa Zachodnia (stops at the Platform 9) and Warszawa Gdańska.

=== S40 line ===
Piaseczno – Radzymin

Line started running on 13 March 2023. One train per hour on working days connects the city of Piaseczno with central Warsaw. Trains departure by turns with S4 line.

=== Former lines ===
==== Line S9 (Warszawa Zachodnia – Legionowo) ====
The line was established in March 2010, running between Warszawa Gdańska and Legionowo with some trains reaching Wieliszew. It was initially operated by Masovian Railways and, from 5 September 2011, gradually taken over by SKM. Since December 2011 the line is fully operated by SKM. From 1 September 2012, the line extended from Warszawa Gdańska to Platform 8 of Warszawa Zachodnia, now called Warszawa Wola.

As of 2022, S9 services remain suspended until further notice.

Station	District/Town
Warszawa Zachodnia	Warszawa Wola; Warszawa Ochota
Warszawa Wola	Warszawa Wola
Warszawa Młynów	Warszawa Wola
Warszawa Gdańska	Warszawa Śródmieście
Warszawa ZOO	Warszawa Praga Północ
Warszawa Praga	Warszawa Targówek
Warszawa Toruńska	Warszawa Targówek/Białołęka
Warszawa Żerań	Warszawa Białołęka
Warszawa Płudy	Warszawa Białołęka
Warszawa Choszczówka	Warszawa Białołęka
Legionowo	Legionowo
Legionowo Piaski	Legionowo
Michałów Reginów	Michałów-Reginów
Wieliszew	Wieliszew Kolonia

== See also ==
- Warszawska Kolej Dojazdowa (WKD) - Light rail commuter line in Poland's capital city of Warsaw.
- Masovian Railways (KM) - Regional rail operator in the Masovian Voivodeship of Poland.
- Polskie Koleje Państwowe S.A. - Dominant railway operator in Poland.
- Polregio - Polish railway operator; formerly Przewozy Regionalne.
