= Warszawa Targówek railway station =

Railway stop in Warsaw, Poland

Warszawa Targówek
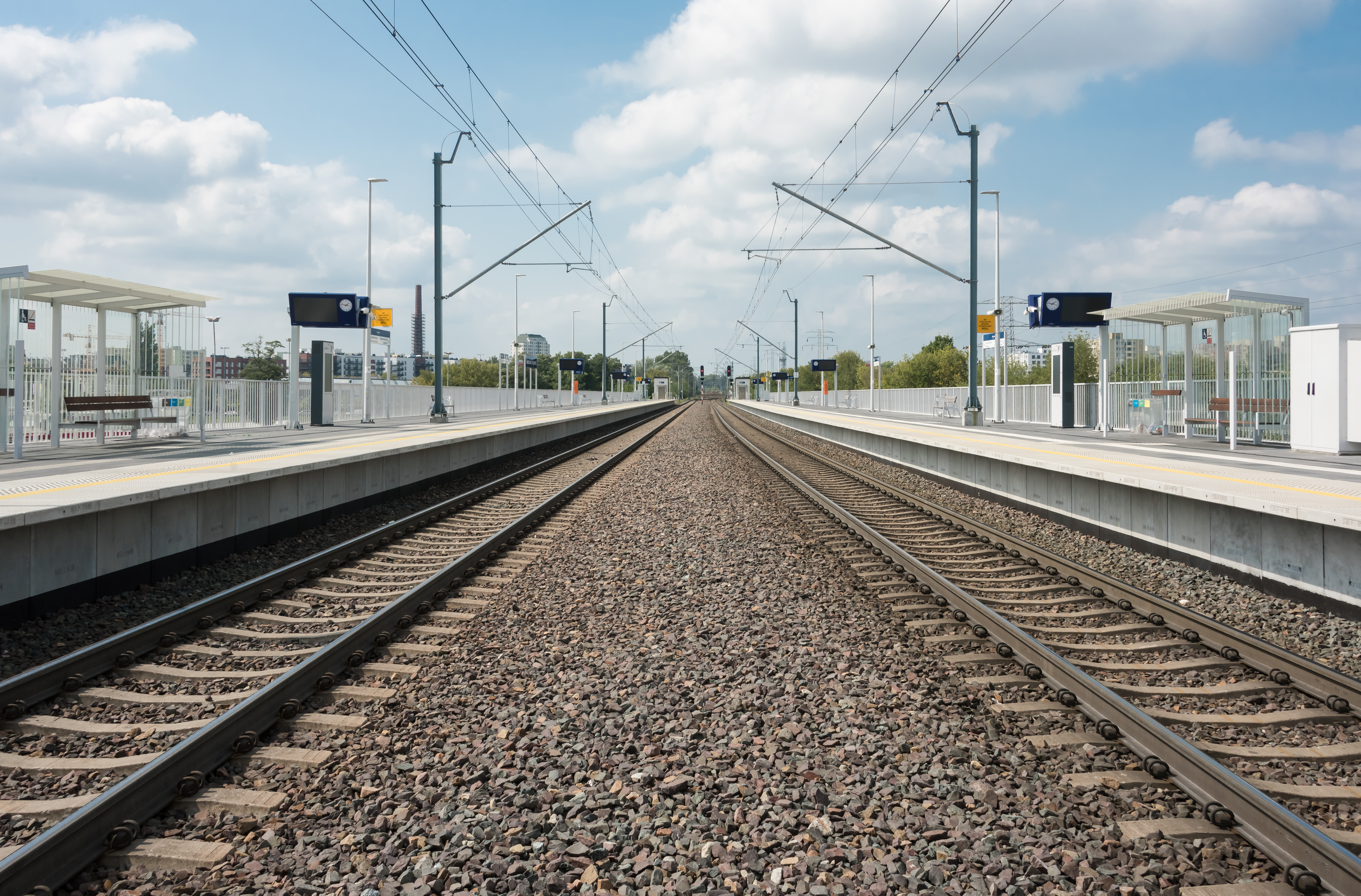

General information
- Location: Praga-Północ, Warsaw; Poland
- Coordinates: 52°15′50″N 21°03′14″E
- Owner: Polskie Koleje Państwowe S.A.
- Platforms: 2
- Tracks: 2

Construction
- Structure type: Building: No

History
- Opened: 12 December 2021

Services
Preceding station	Masovian Railways	Following station
Warszawa Wschodnia towards Warsaw Chopin Airport	RL	Warszawa Toruńska towards Modlin
Location

Warszawa Targówek railway station is a railway station in the Praga-Północ district of Warsaw, Poland. As of 2022, it is used by Masovian Railways, which runs services to Modlin and Warszawa Centralna.

The station was opened on 12 December 2021.
