= Warszawa Wola railway station =

Railway station in Warsaw, Poland

Warszawa Wola
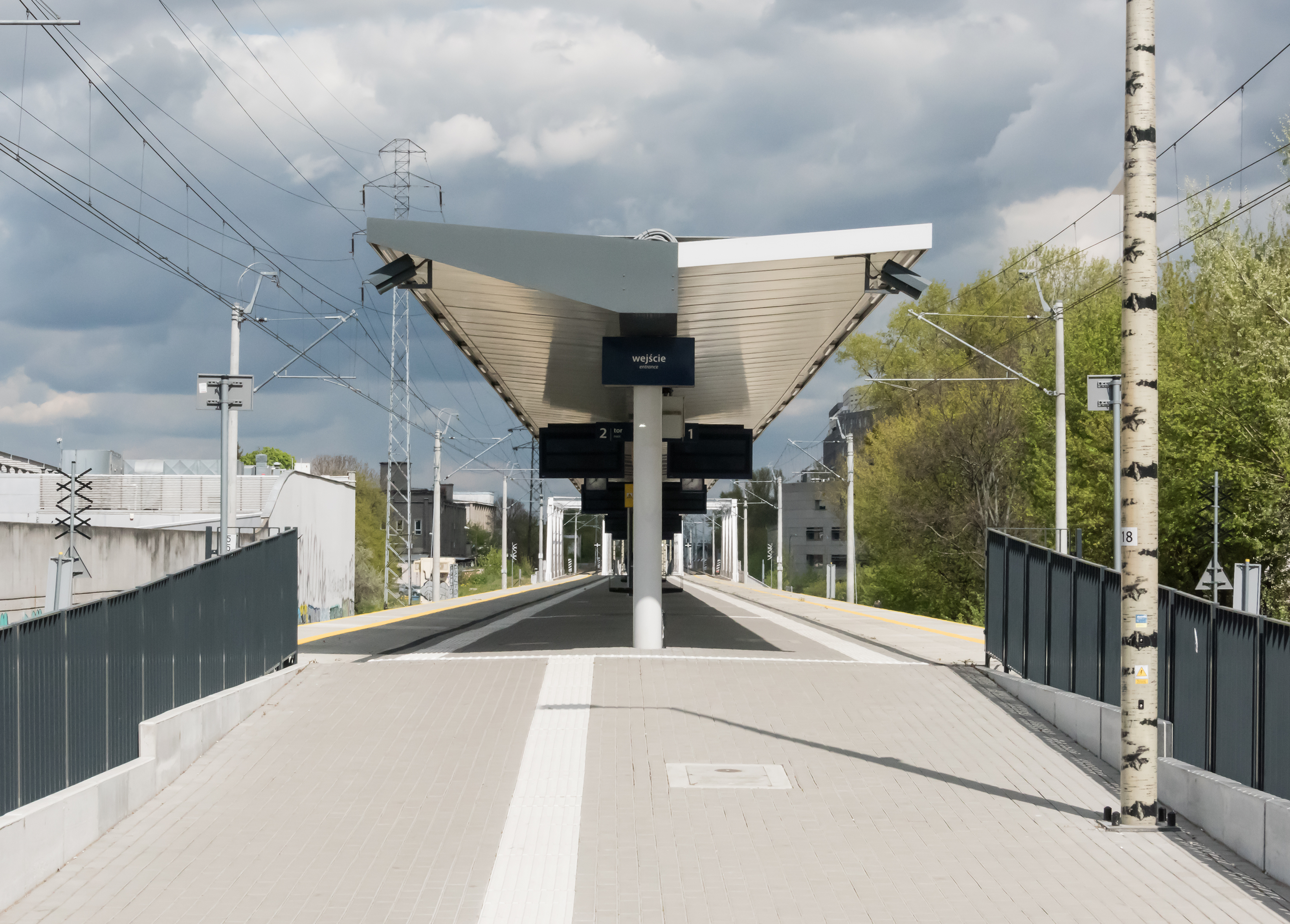
- Warszawa Wola in 2020

General information
- Location: Wola, Warsaw, Masovian; Poland
- Coordinates: 52°13′47″N 20°57′28″E
- Owner: Polskie Koleje Państwowe S.A.
- Line: 20
- Platforms: 1
- Tracks: 2

Construction
- Structure type: Building: No

History
- Former names: Warszawa Kasprzaka

Services
Preceding station	Masovian Railways	Following station
Warszawa Zachodnia Terminus	R90	Warszawa Młynów towards Działdowo
Warszawa Zachodnia Terminus	RE90	Warszawa Młynów towards Działdowo
Preceding station	SKM Warsaw	Following station
Warszawa Zachodnia towards Warsaw Chopin Airport	S3	Warszawa Młynów towards Legionowo Piaski or Radzymin
Warszawa Zachodnia towards Piaseczno	S4	Warszawa Młynów towards Zegrze Południowe
Location

Warszawa Wola railway station is a railway station in the Wola district of Warsaw, Poland. It was built on the Warsaw orbital line, which goes through Warszawa Gdańska station. In 2011, it is used exclusively by Masovian Railways who run the KM9 services from Warszawa Zachodnia through the north of the Masovian Voivodeship to Działdowo, in the Warmian-Masurian Voivodeship via Legionowo, Nasielsk, Modlin, Ciechanów and Mława, at all of which some trains terminate.

The station was closed in March 2017 for the reconstruction of the railway line. Upon reopening in October 2018, its name was changed from Warszawa Kasprzaka to Warszawa Wola, taking the name previously used by a station merged in 2012 into the Warszawa Zachodnia railway station.

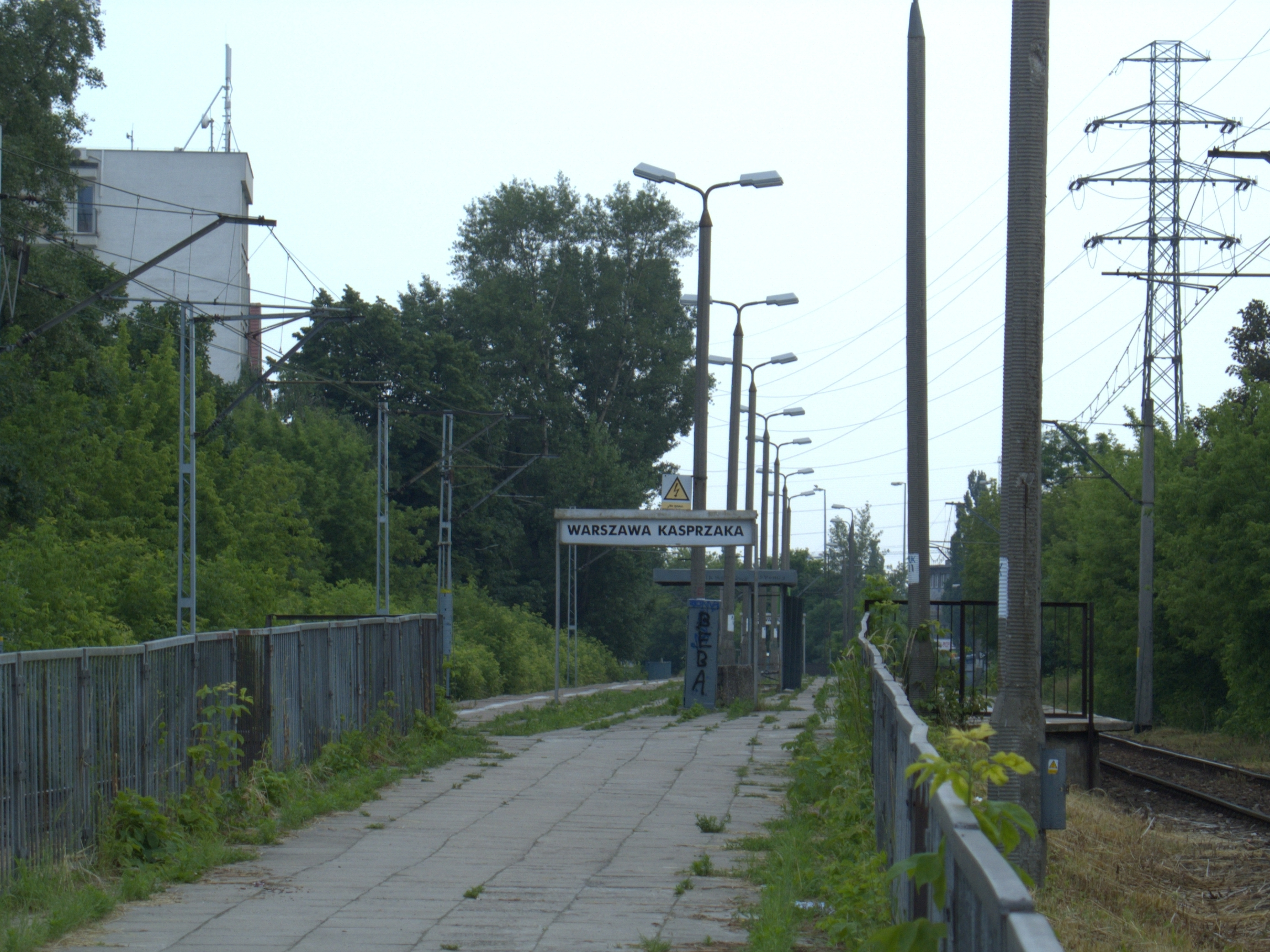
station platforms in 2007

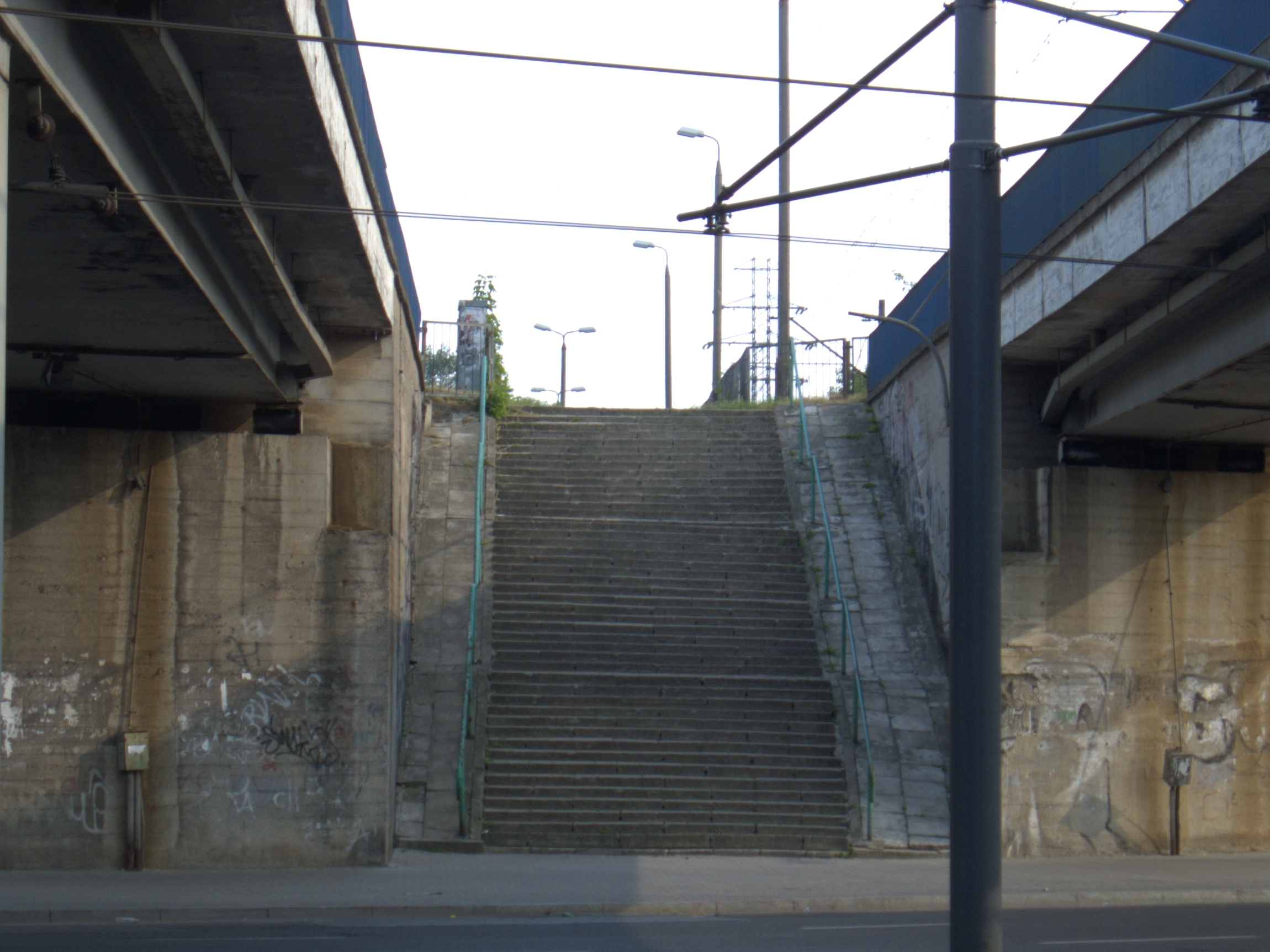
entrance to Warszawa Kasprzaka from street level.

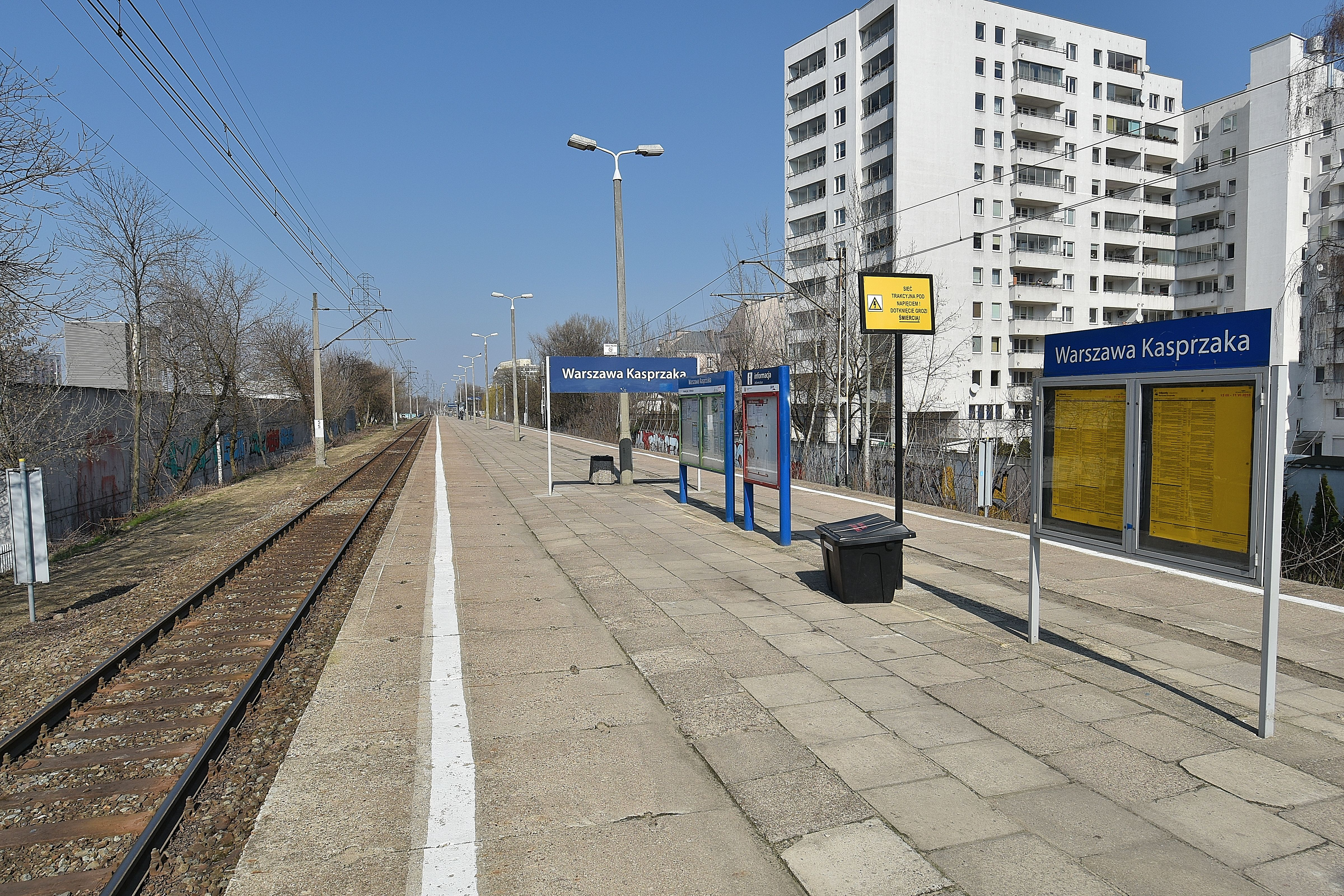
station platforms in 2016
