= Legionowo Piaski railway station =

Railway station in Legionowo, Poland

Legionowo Piaski
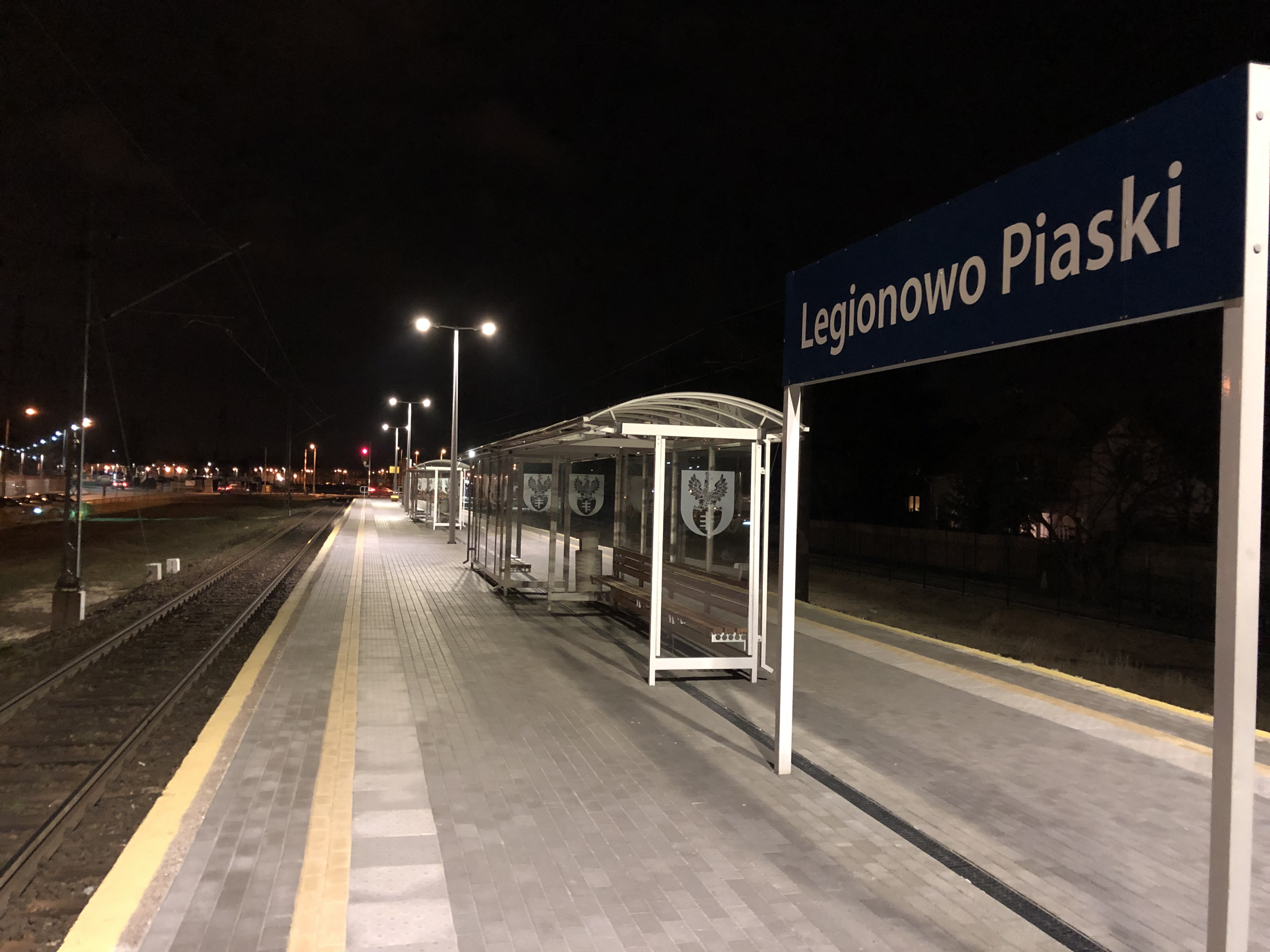
- Legionowo Piaski, railway

General information
- Location: Legionowo, Legionowo, Masovian; Poland
- Coordinates: 52°24′45″N 20°56′32″E
- Owner: Polskie Koleje Państwowe S.A.

Services
| Preceding station | Masovian Railways | Following station |
|---|---|---|
| Legionowo Terminus | R92 | Michałów Reginów towards Tłuszcz |
| Preceding station | SKM Warsaw | Following station |
| Legionowo towards Warsaw Chopin Airport | S3 | Terminus |
| Legionowo towards Warsaw Chopin Airport | S3 | Michałów Reginów towards Radzymin |
| Legionowo towards Piaseczno | S4 | Michałów Reginów towards Zegrze Południowe |
Location

Legionowo Piaski railway station is a railway station in Legionowo, Poland. It is served by Rapid Urban Railway (Warsaw) and Masovian Railways.
