= Białołęka =

- Dzielnica of Warsaw
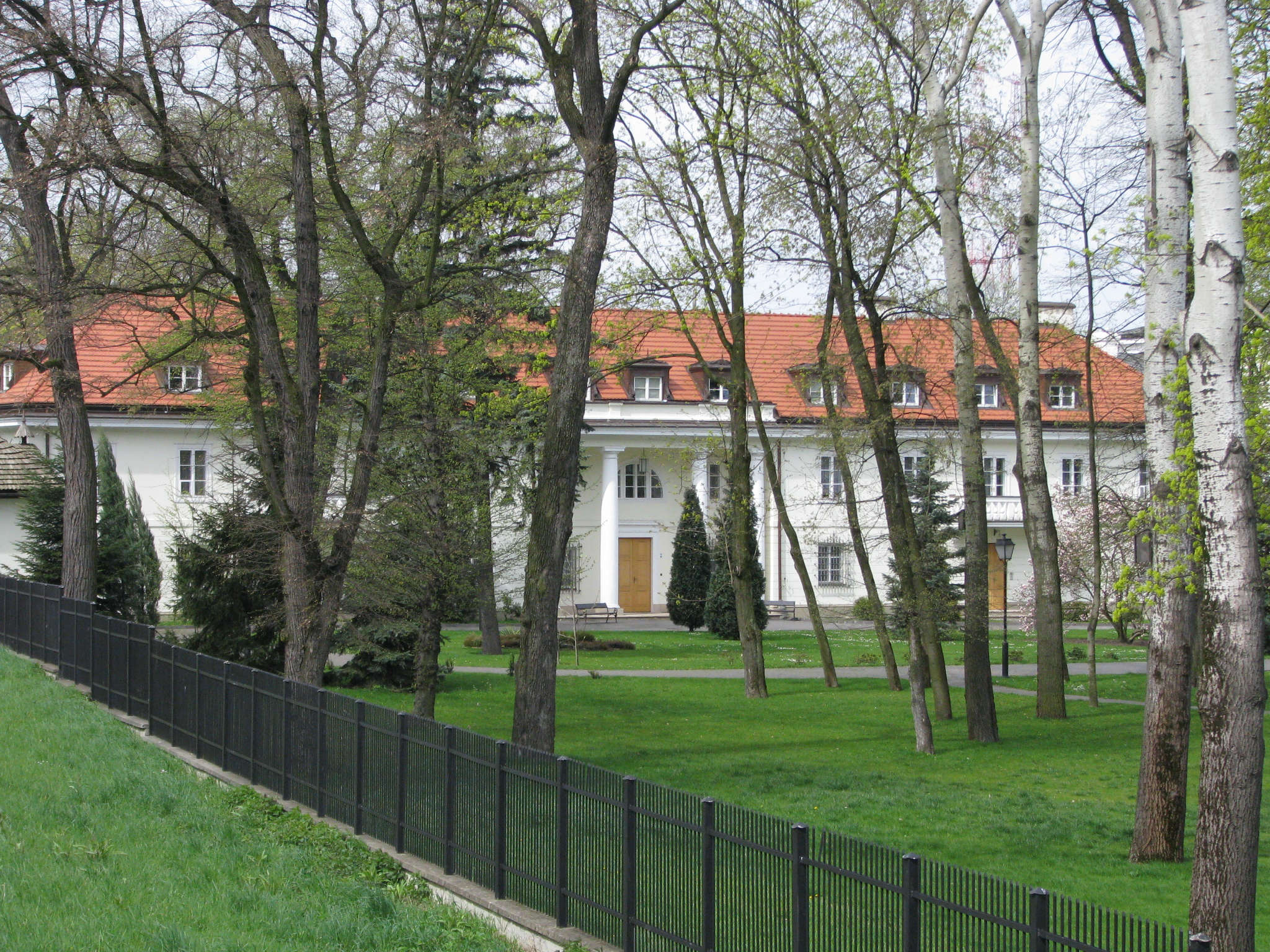
- Mostowski Palace

- Flag Coat of arms

- Location of Białołęka within Warsaw
- Coordinates: 52°19′15.60″N 20°58′13.80″E
- Country: Poland
- Voivodeship: Masovian
- County/City: Warsaw

Government
  - Mayor: Grzegorz Kuca

Area
  - Total: 73.04 km^{2} (28.20 sq mi)

Population (2020)
  - Total: 129,106
  - Density: 1,768/km^{2} (4,578/sq mi)
- Time zone: UTC+1 (CET)
  - Summer (DST): UTC+2 (CEST)
- Area code: +48 22
- Website: bialoleka.um.warszawa.pl

Białołęka (Polish pronunciation: [bʲawɔˈwɛŋka], lit. White Meadow) is one of 18 districts of Warsaw, located in the northern part of the city. Until October 27, 2002 Białołęka was a gmina of Warsaw.

According to the Central Statistical Office data, the district's area is 73.04 square kilometres (28.20 square miles) and 92 768 people inhabit Białołęka.

== History ==
On the fields of Białołęka, one of the battles with the Swedish on July 28–30, 1656 took place. On February 25, 1831 one of the battles of the November Uprising – Battle of Białołęka – took place.

- In 1425, the Białołęka village came into being and belonged to the Gołyński family.
- During the interwar period, only the Różopol subdivision was part of Warsaw.
- In 1938 Białołęka had 900 inhabitants and belonged to the Bródno municipality.
- In 1951 a group of villages (including Białołęka) joined Warsaw as result of the new administrative divisions of Warsaw.
- In 1976, during the next border changes, more villages joined Warsaw and the north-eastern border of Warsaw reached the point where it remains today.
- In 1994, the Białołęka subdivision gave its name to the new gmina Warsaw-Białołęka. The gmina was the third largest out of eleven Warsaw gminas - 15% of the city's area.
- In 2002, the territorial division of Warsaw changed, and gminas were replaced with dzielnicas.
- In 2012, the Maria Skłodowska-Curie Bridge was opened, connecting Białołęka with another district Bielany.

== Division ==
The area of the division is subdivided into following parts:

- industrial, where many industries are located in central, southern and southern-western parts: Żerań CHP Station (Elektrociepłownia Żerań), Polfa Tarchomin (a pharmaceutical company), Czajka sludgeworks, printing site of Agora SA publisher, factories of L'Oréal and the Coca-Cola Company, PKP rail sites, and many building companies
- housing estates with high density housing located in the central-western part (Nowy Tarchomin, Nowodwory and Nowe Świdry)
- housing estates with prevalent detached housing - northern and central-northern parts (Choszczówka, Białołęka Dworska, Płudy, Henryków and others)
- housing estates in village areas and arable lands (Brzeziny, Lewandów, Kobiałka, Białołęka Szlachecka, Mańki-Wojdy and others)

== Subdivisions of Białołęka ==
Białołęka is divided into smaller subdivisions (osiedles). Below is a list of them (the italic names are the ones which are not taken into account by the TERYT).

West

- Buchnik
- Buków
- Kalenica
- Kępa Tarchomińska
- Winnica
- Nowodwory
- Buczynek
- Anecin
- Tarchomin Kościelny
- Nowe Świdry
- Nowy Tarchomin
- Stare Świdry
- Piekiełko
- Żerań

Middle west

- Choszczówka-Kolonia
- Góry Skierdowskie
- Nowe Brzeziny
- Dąbrówka Szlachecka
- Płudy
- Henryków
- Wiśniewo
- Tarchomin
- Piekiełko
- Żerań
- Różopol

Middle east

- Choszczówka
- Łapigrosz
- Różopole
- Szamocin
- Białołęka Dworska
- Tomaszew
- Dąbrówka Grzybowska
- Marcelin
- Białołęka Szlachecka
- Konstantynów
- Żerań Wschodni
- Aleksandrów
- Annopol

East

- Kobiałka
- Ruskowy Bród
- Olesin
- Augustówek
- Mańki-Wojdy
- Augustów
- Brzeziny
- Kąty Grodziskie
- Grodzisk
- Lewandów

Other subdivisions:

- Szylówek

== Green Białołęka ==
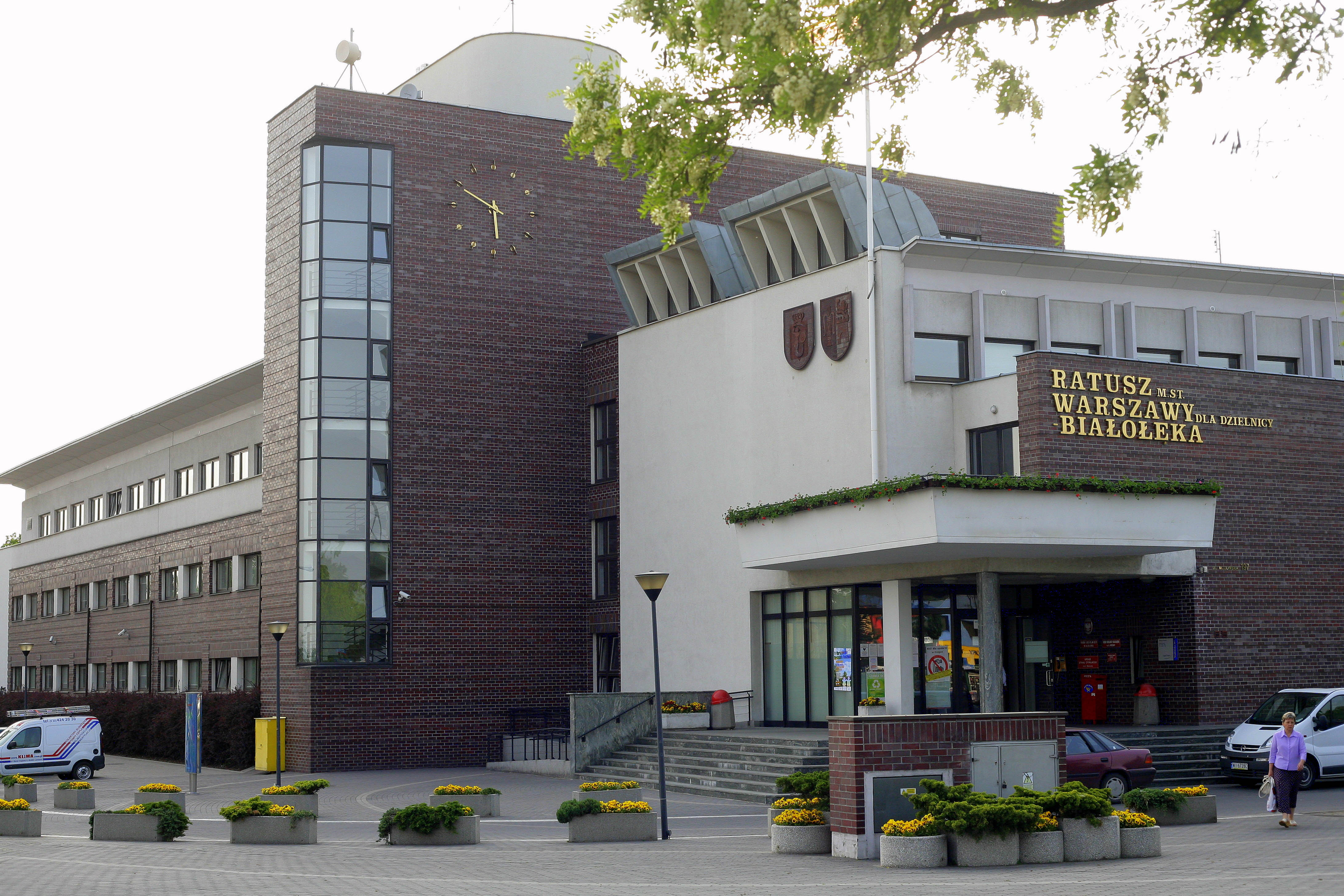
Town hall of Białołęka

Białołęka's subdivisions from 1951 to 1976

- Parks:
1. Henrykowski Park – 30 056 m²
2. "Picassa" Park – 36 700 m²
- Squares
1. By Botewa/Talarowa streets – 5088 m²
2. Next to Picassa housing estate – 32 900 m²
3. Around the town hall – 4560 m²
4. By Światowida street – 4600 m²
- Flowerbeds
1. Area of flowerbeds – 250 m²
2. Area of rose-gardens – 177 m²
- Surface waters
1. Vistula river – 10 123 m
2. Henrykowski canal – 9638 m
3. Żerański canal – 9240 m
4. Długa river + Markowski canal – 5450 m
5. Bródnowski canal – 3600 m
6. Dyke B – 3270 m
7. Dyke A – 2640 m
8. Jabłonna stream – 1838 m
- Natural reserves
1. Ławice Kiełpińskie natural reserve – fauna natural reserve near the border of Warsaw, which function is to protect places where water-mud birds make nests. Area - 803 hectares.
2. Łęgi Czarnej Strugi natural reserve – situated in the north-west part of Nieporęt gmina. Area - 39,53 hectares.

There are also many different-sized forests in Białołęka.

== Monuments of Białołęka ==
- Court on Mehoffera Street

This consists of a court from the 18th century, a palace from the beginning of the 18th century, once occupied by the statesman, Tadeusz Mostowski, and a park.

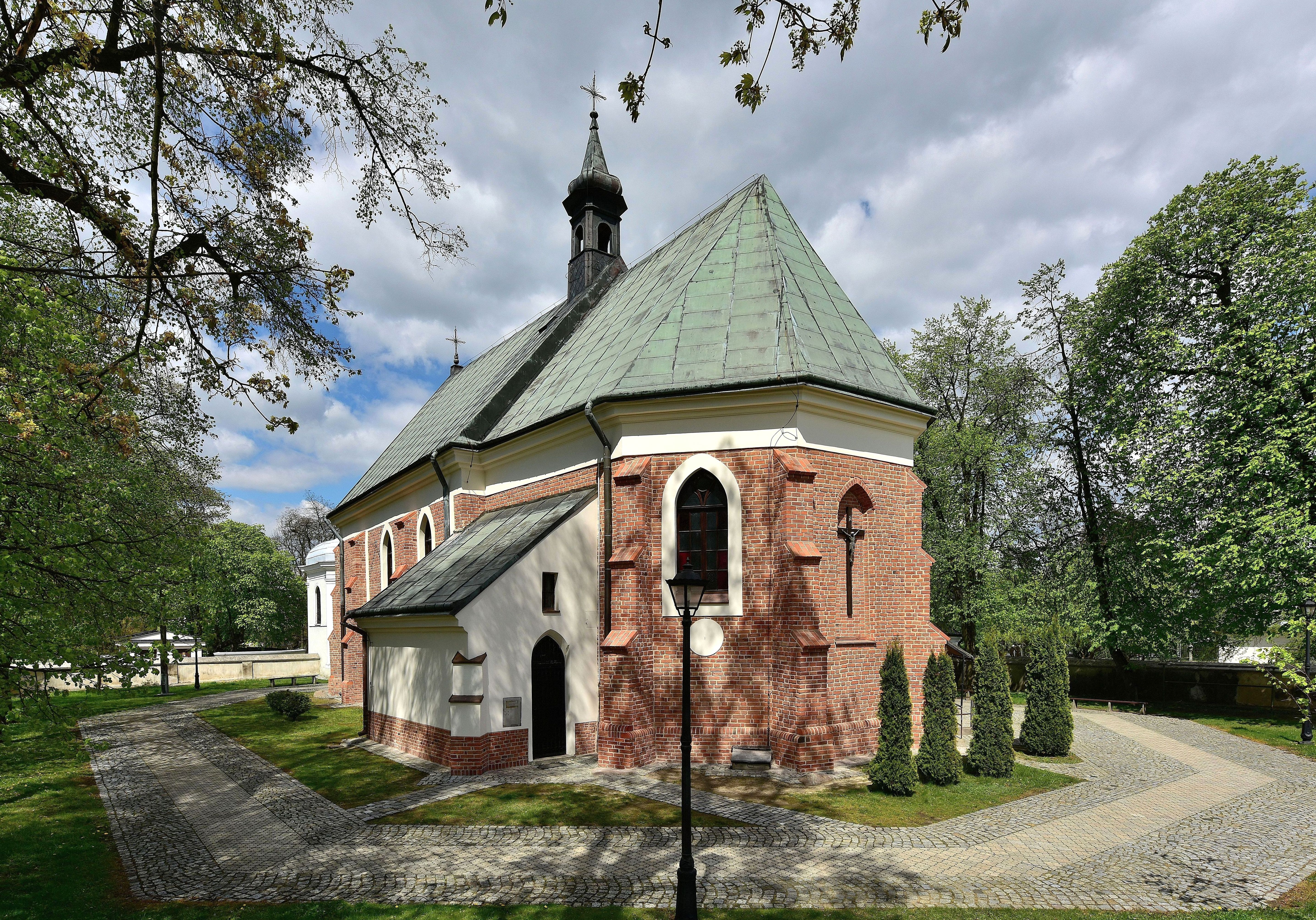
Church of St James the Great

- Church of St James the Great

2 Mehoffera Street
The Church of St James the Great on Mehoffera Street is the only Gothic temple in Warsaw which still looks nearly the same today as when it was built. The architectural details from 16th century are still visible. The church is built from brick and it dates from the beginning of 16th century.

- Church of Birth of the Blessed Virgin Lady

21 Klasyków Street
A church built from 1908 to 1913 in Vistula Neo-Gothic style. It was consecrated on September 8, 1913, and on September 16, 1949 it was given its name by Stefan Wyszyński.

- Church of Michelangelo

119 Głębocka Street
One of the oldest wooden churches in Warsaw, probably founded by Bona Sforza in 1534.

== Transport in Białołęka ==
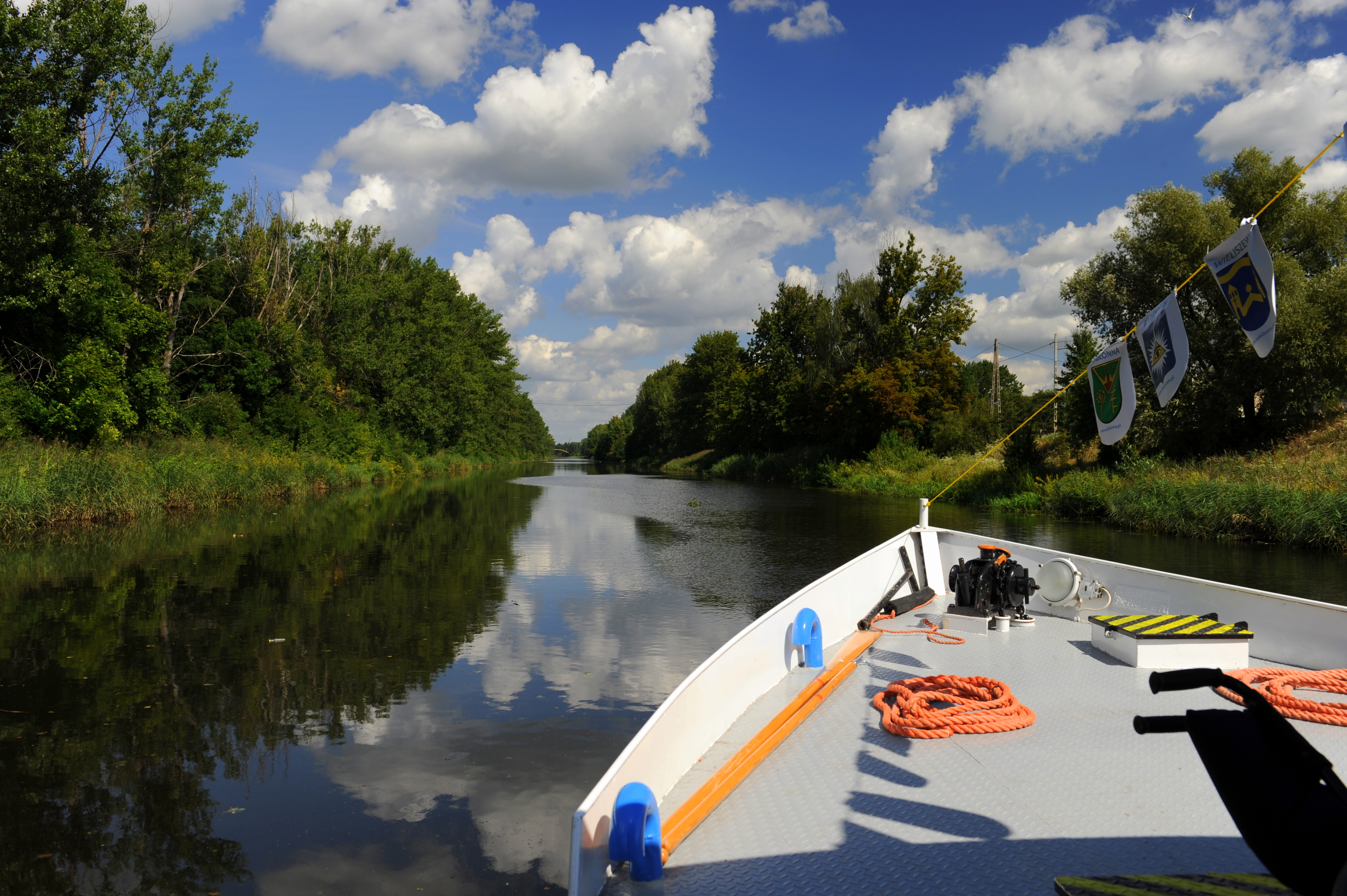
Żerań Canal

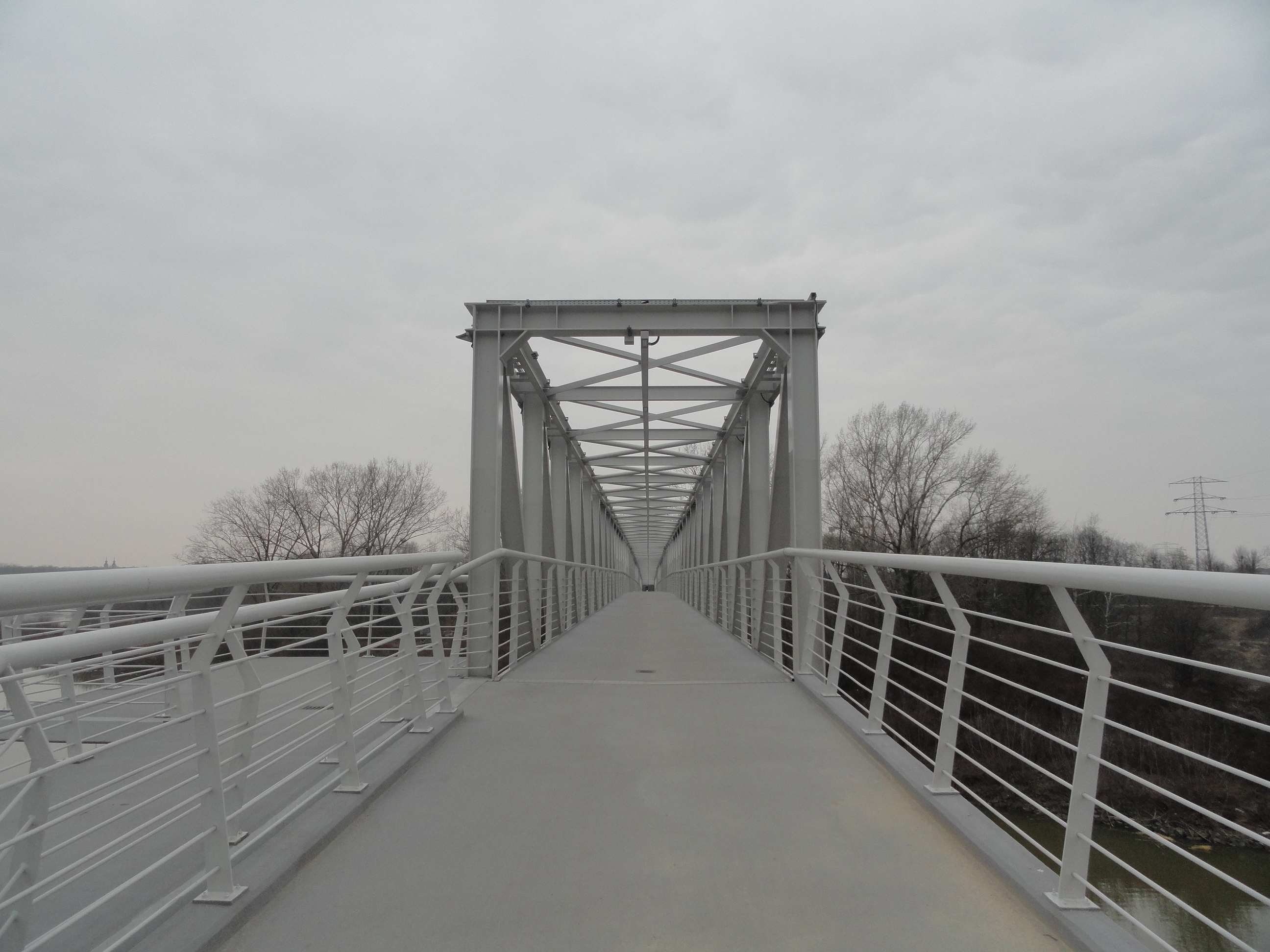
A footbridge over the canal

The main route where all transport goes is Modlińska Street (an extension of Jagiellońska), which is a part of trunk road 61 to Gdańsk and Masuria; and the Toruńska route, part of trunk road 8 to Białystok. Płochocińska Street is also an important transport route as a fragment of the 633 voivodeship road to Nieporęt.

There are also plans of creating whole-city-long routes including Białołęka's routes:

- Maria Skłodowska-Curie Bridge route
- Vistula route
- Olszynka Grochowska route
- extension of Marywilska Street to the borders of Warsaw

A railway to Działdowo goes through the district. There are three stops on the railway, on which Masovian Railways passenger trains, going from Warszawa Gdańska and Warszawa Wola (now Warszawa Zachodnia's eighth platform) stations, going to Legionowo, Nasielsk, Ciechanów and Działdowo, stop.

In 2013, the first stage of a tram line extension brought the Warsaw tram network to Białołęka with line 2 connecting the area to the Młociny metro station across the Maria Skłodowska-Curie Bridge.

== Borders ==
Białołęka borders:

- Targówek to the south along the Toruńska Route
- Bielany and Łomianki to the west across the Vistula
- Jabłonna and Nieporęt to the north
- Marki to the east

== Notable people ==
- Piotr Szulczewski (born 1981), entrepreneur and founder and CEO of e-commerce site Wish.

== See also ==
- Żerań
