= Warszawa Gdańska railway station =

Railway station in Warsaw, Poland

Warszawa Gdańska
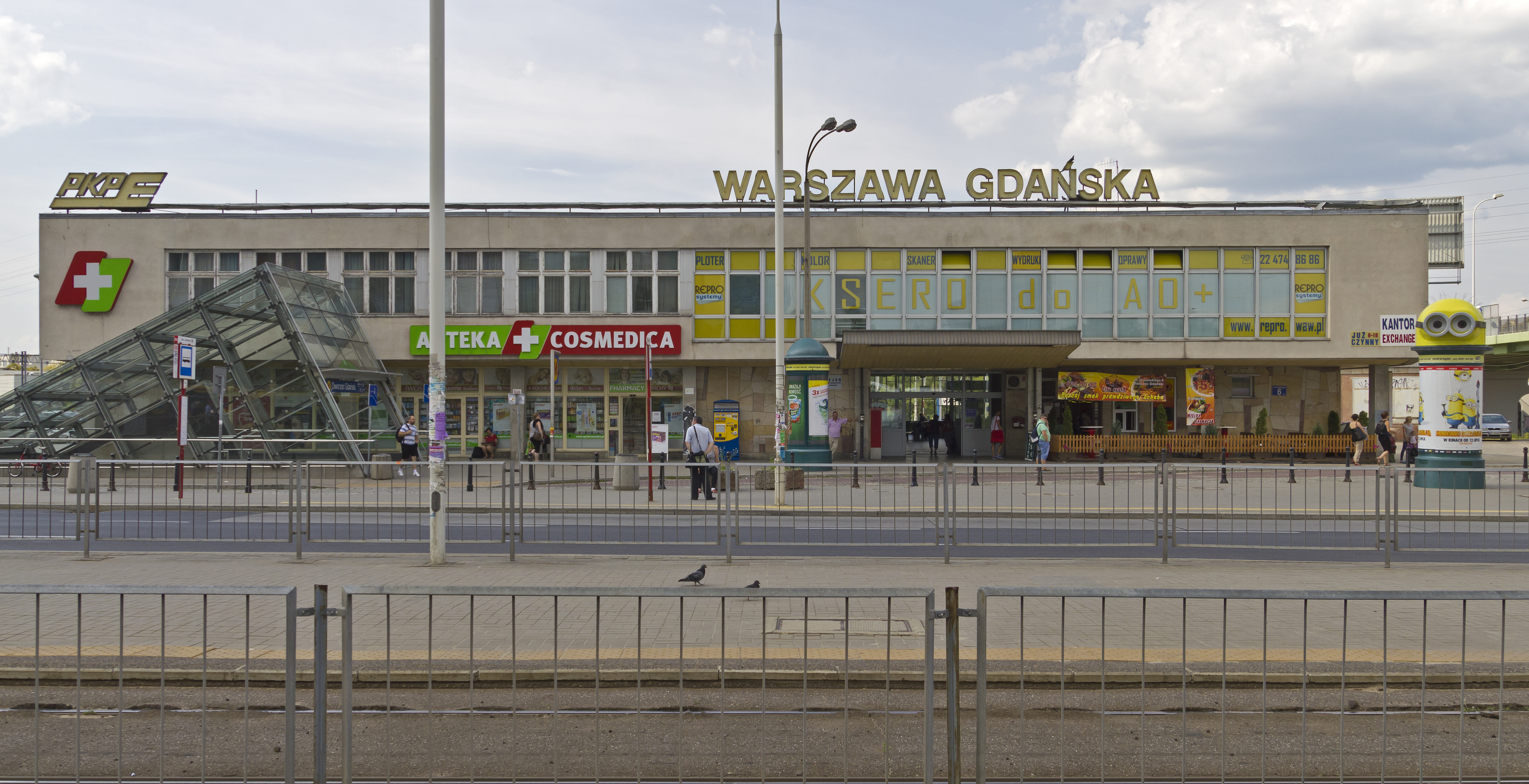

General information
- Coordinates: 52°15′31″N 20°59′41″E
- System: Railway Station
- Owner: Polish State Railways SA
- Lines: Route 20 (Warszawa Główna Towarowa - Warszawa Praga); Route 509 (Warszawa Główna Towarowa - Warszawa Gdańska)
- Platforms: 3
- Tracks: 6
- Connections: Dworzec Gdański

Construction
- Structure type: Ground level

History
- Opened: 1880
- Rebuilt: 1920, 1948, 1958-1959, 1984
- Former names: Vistulan Main Train Station (Polish: Główny Dworzec Kolei Nadwiślańskiej)

Passengers
- PKP Category B Station
Location

Warszawa Gdańska station (also known as Dworzec Gdański; literally Gdańsk station) is a railway station in northern Warsaw, Poland. The name of the station derives from its past as the main station serving trains towards Gdańsk. Currently, trains in that direction use the main Cross-City Line and the Warszawa Centralna railway station.

It is located on the "Northern Line" that runs between Central Warsaw and the city's Żoliborz district to the north. It serves as a transportation hub for regional trains departing the station. It connects with the Warsaw Metro's Dworzec Gdański stop, located below the railway station, and a number of nearby tram and bus stops. The Warsaw Metro has received EU funding to build a pedestrian tunnel linking the metro station to the railway station.

The railway station is located some 3.5 km north of the main rail line crossing the city linking Warszawa Wschodnia, Warszawa Centralna and Warszawa Zachodnia railway stations and as such is sometimes used as a reserve station, used by trains during track works on the main line, but that is quite rare, as there are two tracks in each direction on the main line.

Currently (2023), it is used by suburban and regional trains and also by long distance and international trains due to reconstruction of Warsaw Cross-City line.

== History ==
The original station was built around 1880 under the name of Vistulan Main Train Station (Polish: Główny Dworzec Kolei Nadwiślańskiej) and served a local line running along the Vistula river northwards. In the early 20th century, with the opening of a railway bridge over the river south of Warsaw Citadel (directly to the east of the station; the bridge was constructed around 1870, but was initially used by the Russian Army exclusively), it was renamed Warszawa Kowelska (Warsaw Kovel train station) and started serving as a junction between the Warsaw Główna and Warszawa Wileńska stations. Until then the passengers travelling from St. Petersburg to Vienna had to leave the train station at Warszawa Wileńska, take a tram to the city centre and take another train of the European standard gauge (1435 mm) on the Warsaw-Vienna railway. The Warsaw Kovel station also served as the main supply station for the Russian garrison stationed in the Warsaw Citadel.

During the withdrawal of Russian troops from Warsaw in August 1915, the station was demolished, along with the bridge to which it led. After World War I both were rebuilt, and the station was renamed Warszawa Gdańska (Warsaw Gdańsk station), named after the city of Gdańsk.

After 1933, with the opening of the cross-city line, linking three main Warsaw train stations, the Warsaw Gdańsk station lost its importance as a transit station and began serving as a station for local and suburban trains.

After 1942, the western part (adjacent to the Warsaw Ghetto) of the freight station had been adapted to become the Umschlagplatz (collection point) — the deportation facility for Warsaw's Jews.

After World War II, due to the complete destruction of many Warsaw's railway stations, Warsaw Gdańsk was used as a temporary station for long-distance trains, including, until the 1970s, trains passing through Warsaw between the USSR and the west. Among the notable trains to stop there was the Ost-West Express from Moscow to Ostend, Hook of Holland and Paris; the Chopin to Vienna; and the Praha to Prague trains. As such, it was the main location through which people expelled in the aftermath of the Polish 1968 political crisis left Poland. The events of 1968 are now commemorated by a stone tablet on the eastern wall of the building with the inscription by Henryk Grynberg Here they left more than they had.

Between 1958 and 1959 the new building of the station was constructed. It was the first station built in Warsaw after World War II, and it was at the time the most modern station in Warsaw. The building stood until 1984, when it was destroyed in a fire. The station was rebuilt in a few years with some changes - a new story was added.

In the 1970s, the station's long-distance services were completely taken over by the newly built Warszawa Centralna, and Warszawa Gdańska became a minor station for suburban trains.

The last international passenger service to operate from the station was a direct train to Almaty, in Kazakhstan, which ended in about 2000.

== Train services ==
The station is served by the following service(s):

Preceding station	PKP Intercity	Following station
Preceding station	Masovian Railways	Following station
Warszawa Powązki towards Warszawa Zachodnia	R90	Warszawa Zoo towards Działdowo
Warszawa Powązki towards Warszawa Zachodnia	RE90	Warszawa Zoo towards Działdowo
Terminus	RE90	Warszawa Zoo towards Działdowo
Preceding station	SKM Warsaw	Following station
Warszawa Powązki towards Piaseczno	S4	Terminus
Warszawa Powązki towards Piaseczno	S40	Warszawa Zoo towards Warszawa Rakowiec

== Gallery ==
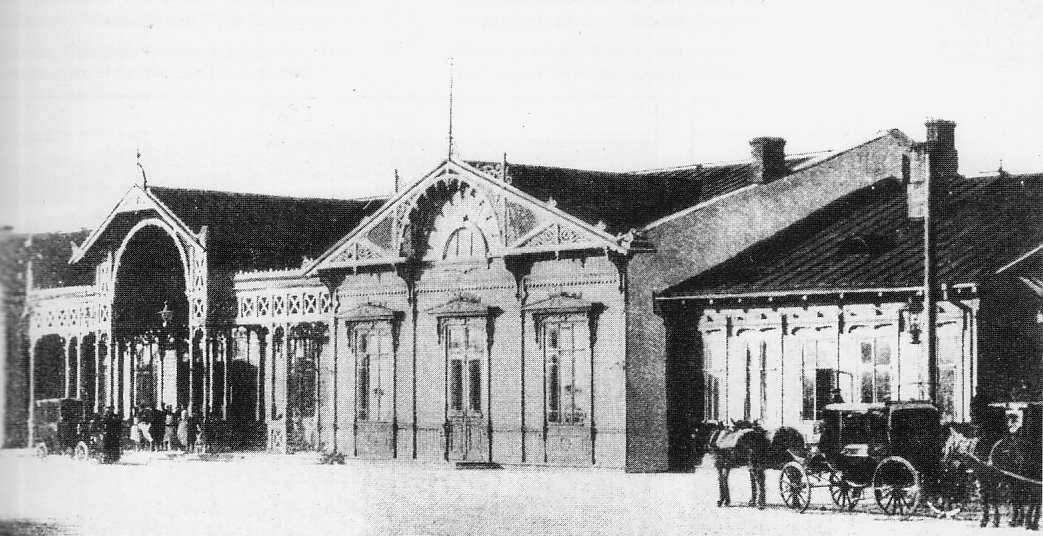
Station building in 1877

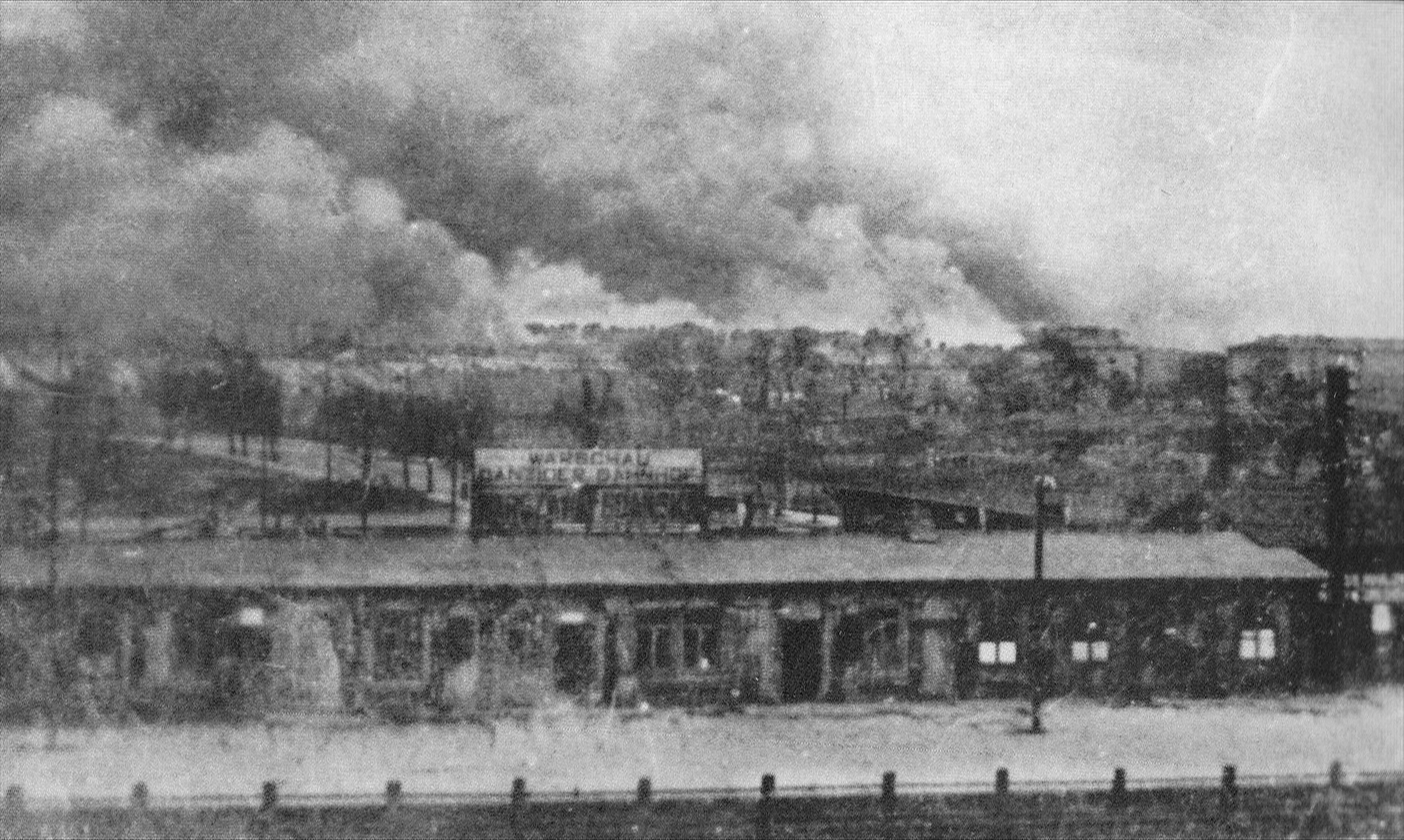
Gdanska railroad station looking toward the Warsaw Ghetto Uprising in 1943

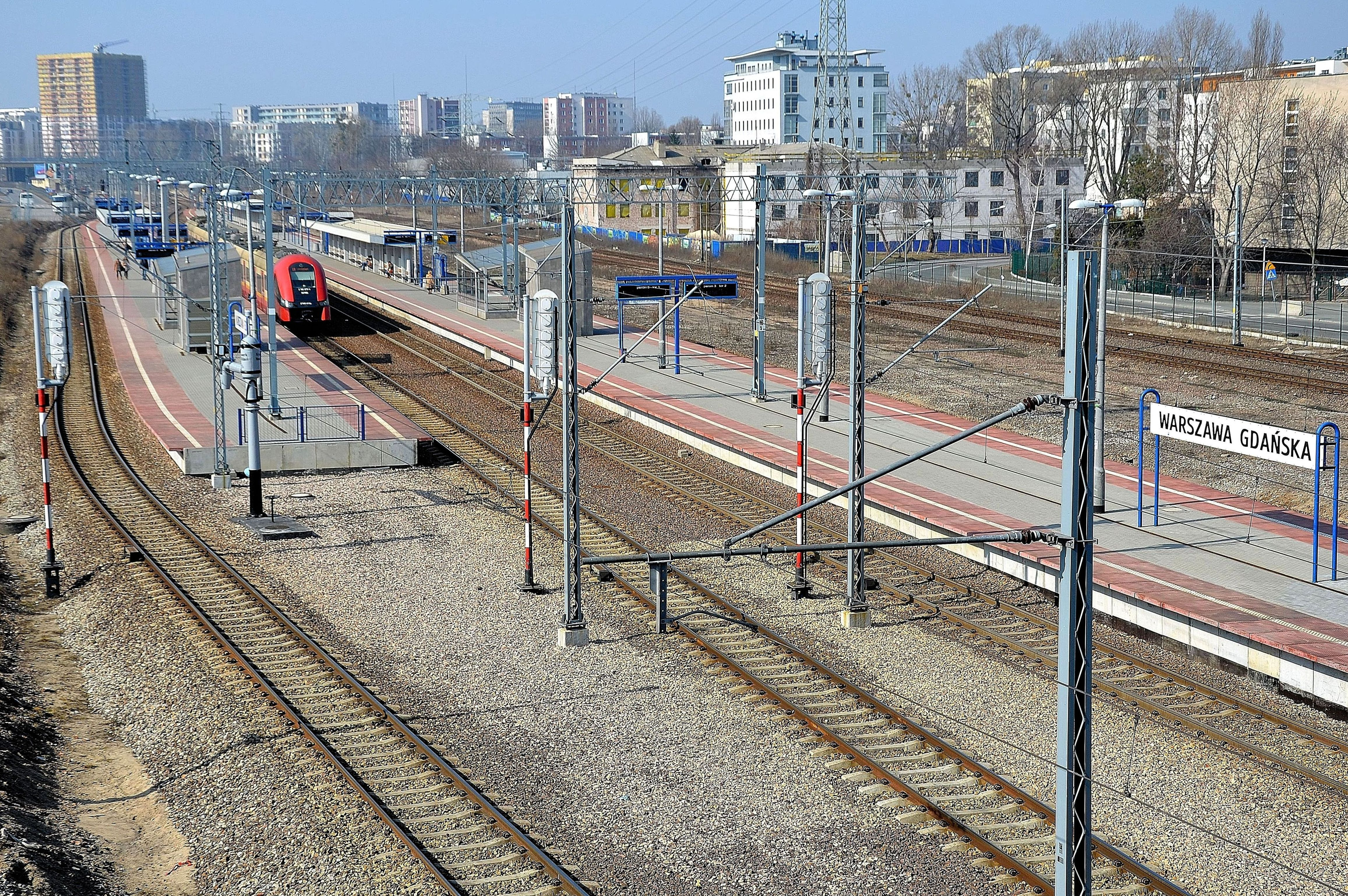
Warszawa Gdańska platforms, view to the west. March 2012
