= Warszawa Lotnisko Chopina railway station =

Railway station in Warsaw, Poland

Warszawa Lotnisko Chopina Warsaw Chopin Airport
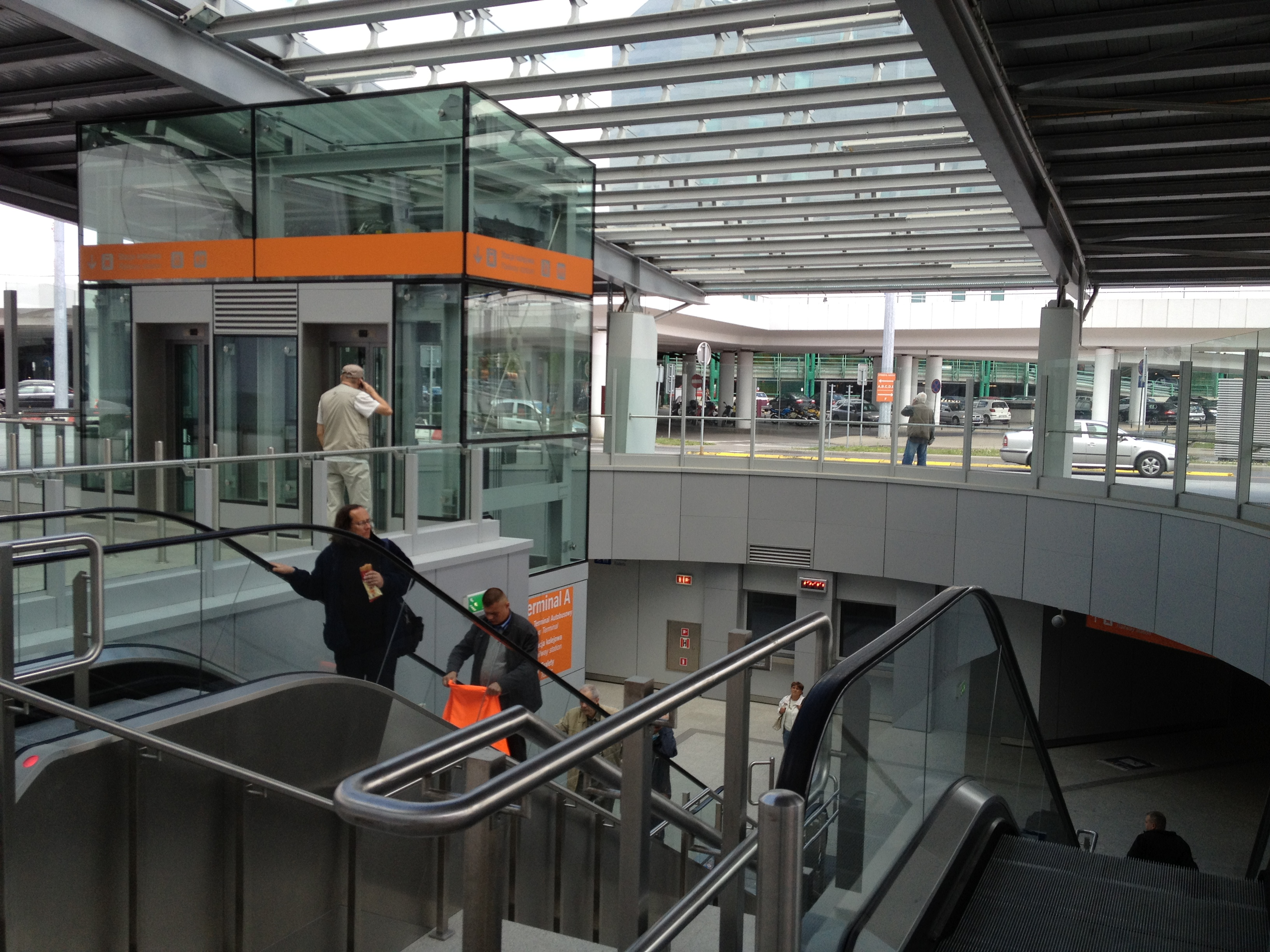

General information
- Location: Włochy, Warsaw, Masovian; Poland
- Coordinates: 52°10′10.67″N 20°58′30.76″E
- Owner: Polskie Koleje Państwowe S.A.
- Platforms: 1

History
- Opened: 2012
Services
Preceding station	Masovian Railways	Following station
Terminus	RL	Warszawa Służewiec towards Modlin
Preceding station	SKM Warsaw	Following station
Terminus	S2	Warszawa Służewiec towards Sulejówek Miłosna
Terminus	S3	Warszawa Służewiec towards Legionowo Piaski or Radzymin
Location

Warszawa Lotnisko Chopina (lit. 'Warsaw Chopin Airport') is the railway station of the Warsaw Chopin Airport in Warsaw, Poland.

The station was built as part of a new Terminal 2 in 2008 but remained out of service until the rail link was completed in 2012. The cost of the 2 km (1.2 mi) link to Warszawa Służewiec was 230 million złoty. The station fully opened for service on 1 June 2012, when Rapid Urban Railway (Warsaw) launched service to Sulejówek and Legionowo. Following the reconstruction of the airport terminal in 2015 a passageway was built connecting it directly with the station.

Service to the station is provided by both Rapid Urban Railway and Masovian Railways.

Trains typically leave every 15 minutes. The journey to central Warsaw takes slightly over 20 minutes and falls under the integrated ticketing system of the Warsaw Transport Authority.

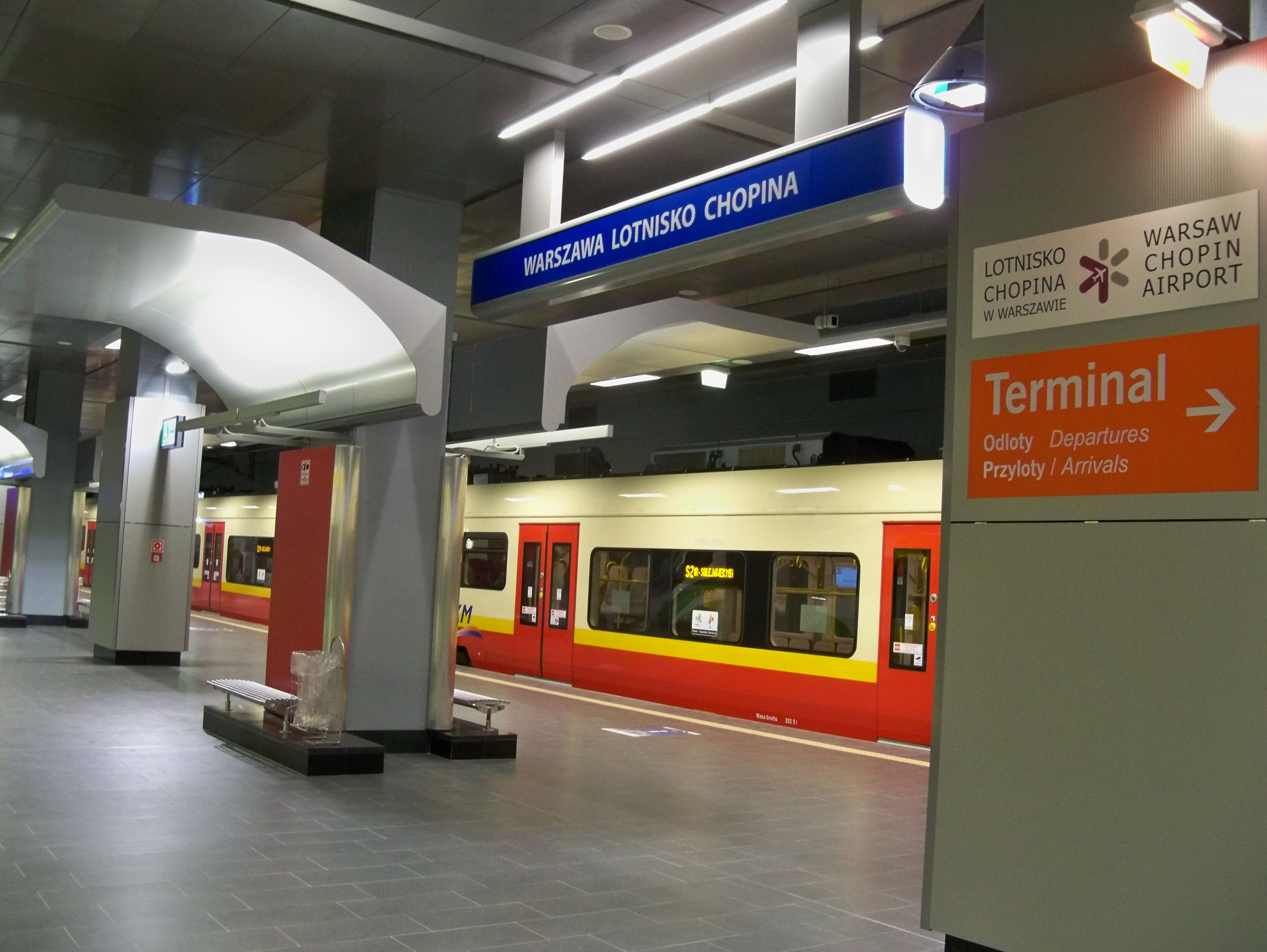
Station interior

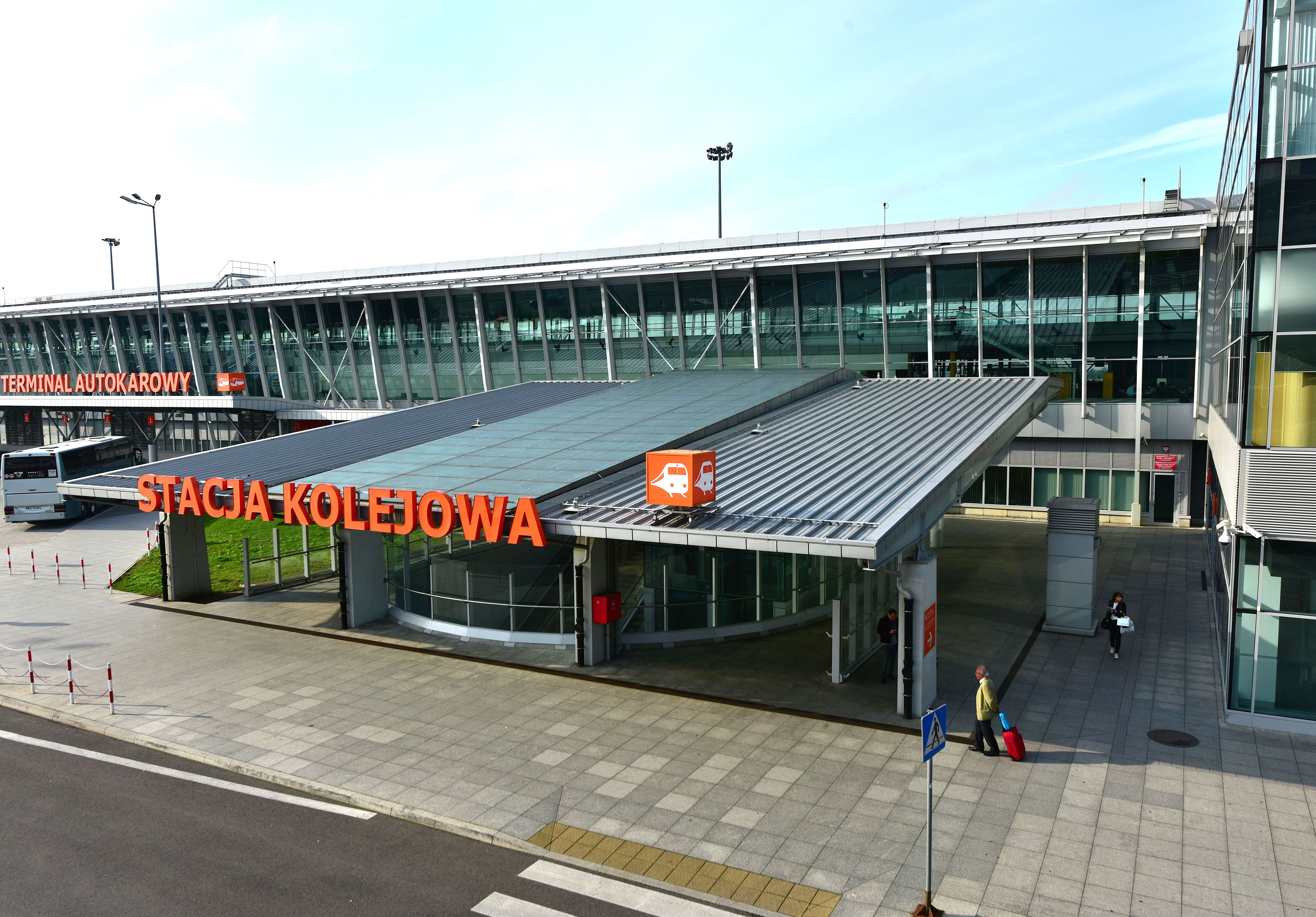
Station entrance

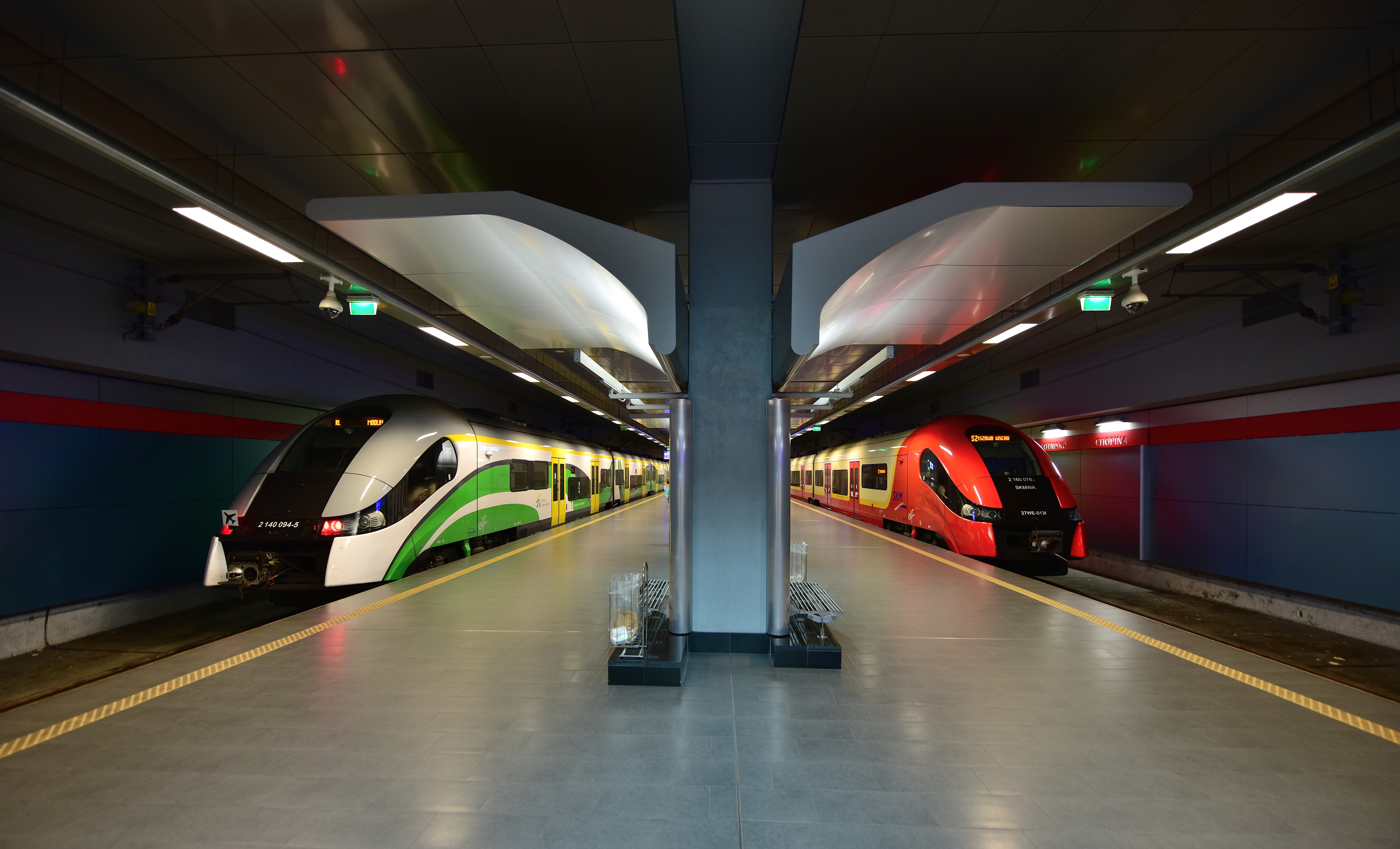
SKM and Masovian Railways trains

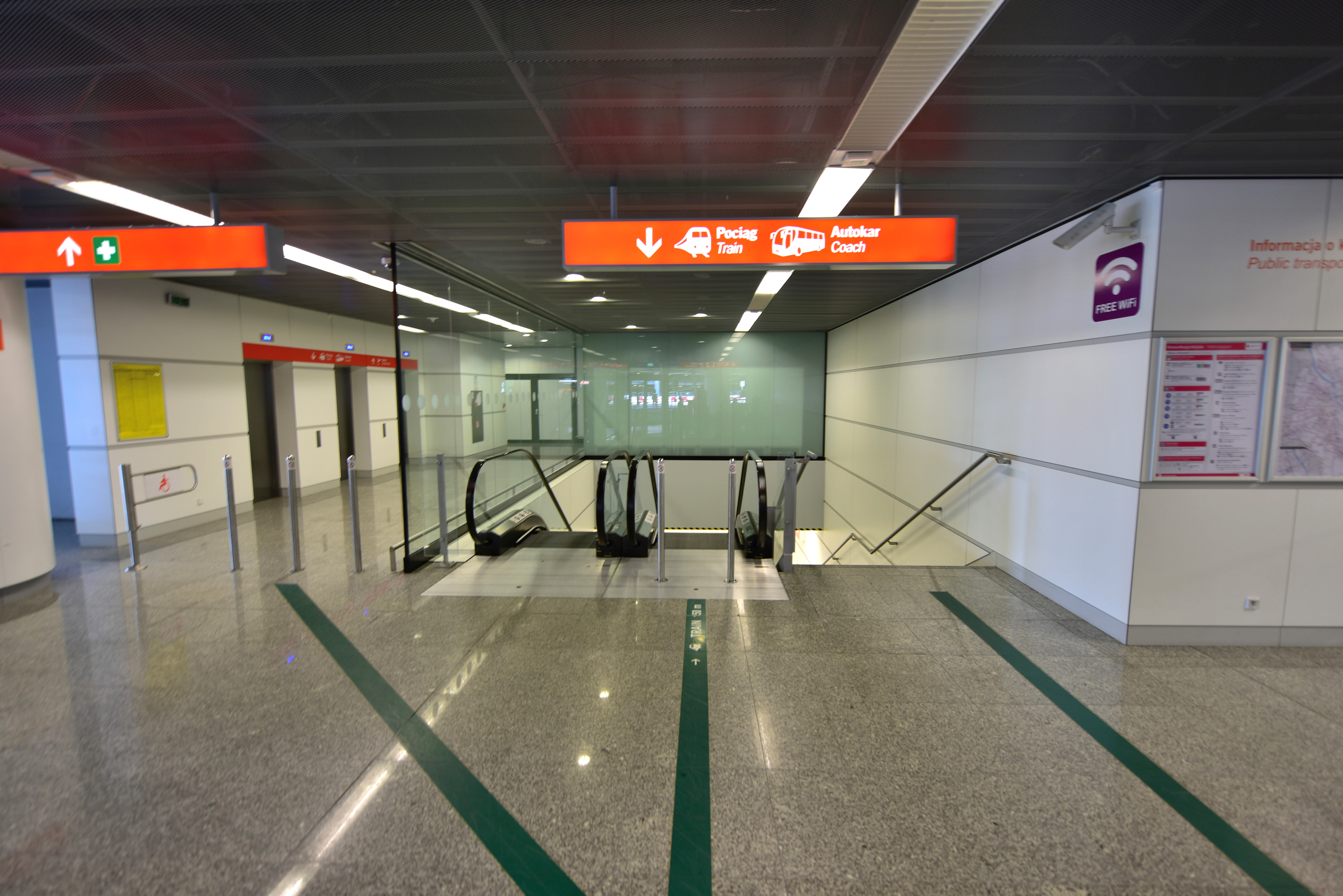
Entrance from the airport terminal
