= Radzymin railway station =

Railway station in Radzymin, Poland

Radzymin
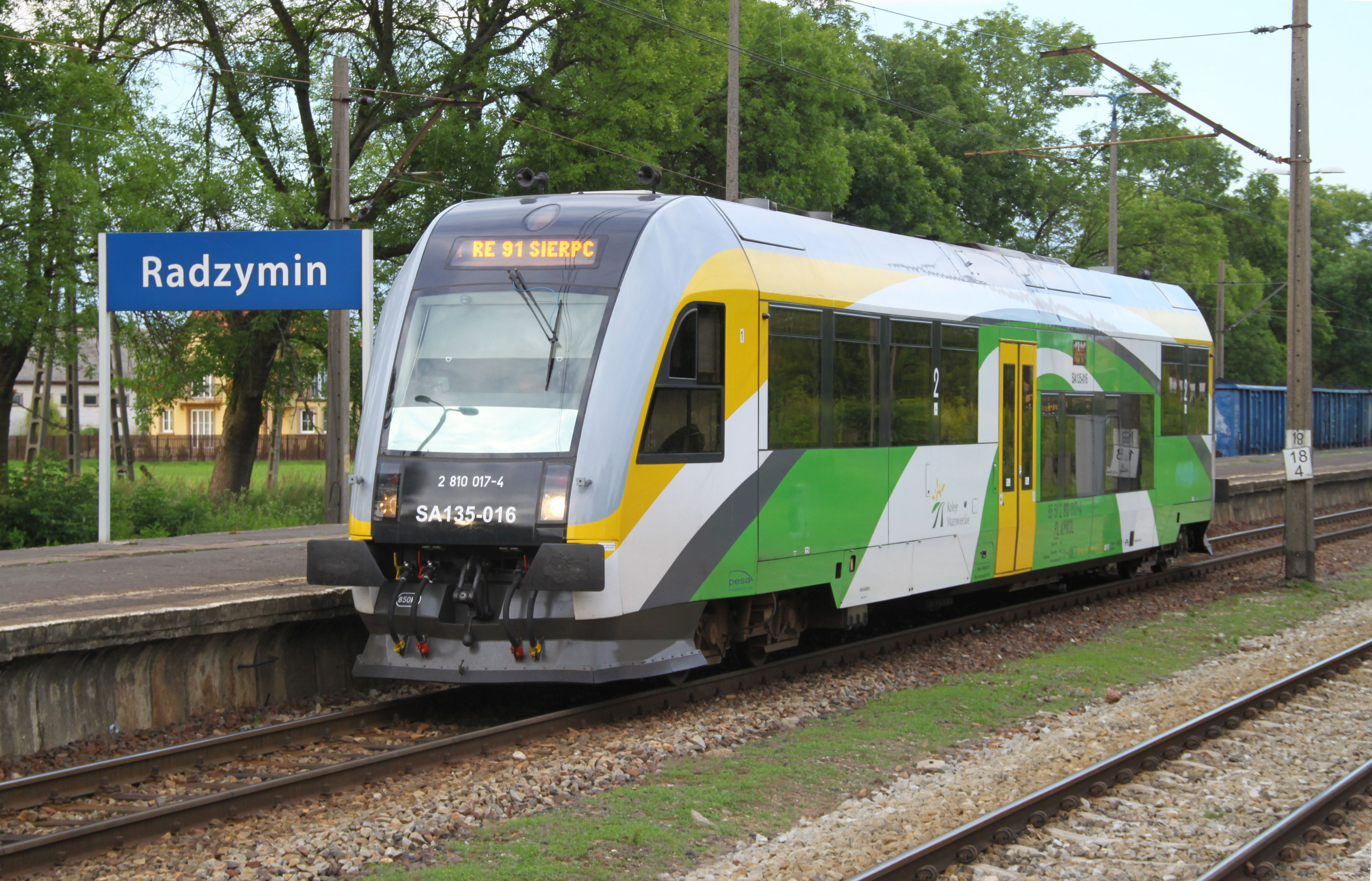

General information
- Location: Radzymin, Radzymin, Wołomin, Masovian; Poland
- Coordinates: 52°25′27″N 21°10′34″E
- System: Rail Station
- Owner: Polskie Koleje Państwowe S.A.

Services
Preceding station	Masovian Railways	Following station
Wieliszew towards Legionowo	R92	Krusze towards Tłuszcz
Preceding station	SKM Warsaw	Following station
Dąbkowizna towards Warsaw Chopin Airport	S3	Terminus
Location

Radzymin railway station is a railway station in Radzymin, Wołomin, Poland. It is served by Masovian Railways.
