= Zegrze Południowe =

- Village
- Location within Poland
- Coordinates: 52°27′21″N 21°0′30″E
- Country: Poland
- Voivodeship: Masovian
- County: Legionowo
- Gmina: Nieporęt
- Population: 1,200

Zegrze Południowe [ˈzɛɡʐɛ pɔwudˈɲɔvɛ] is a village in the administrative district of Gmina Nieporęt, within Legionowo County, Masovian Voivodeship, in east-central Poland.

Zegrze Południowe is the terminus of a 3.5 kilometres (2.2 mi) long railway line from Wieliszew, but passenger service on the line ceased in 1994. In late 2019, Polish railway infrastructure manager PKP PLK called for tenders for the works required to reopen the line, which was reopened to passengers in June 2023. It is currently the terminus of the SKM line S4.
