= Newag 19WE =

Electric multiple unit produced by Newag

19WE
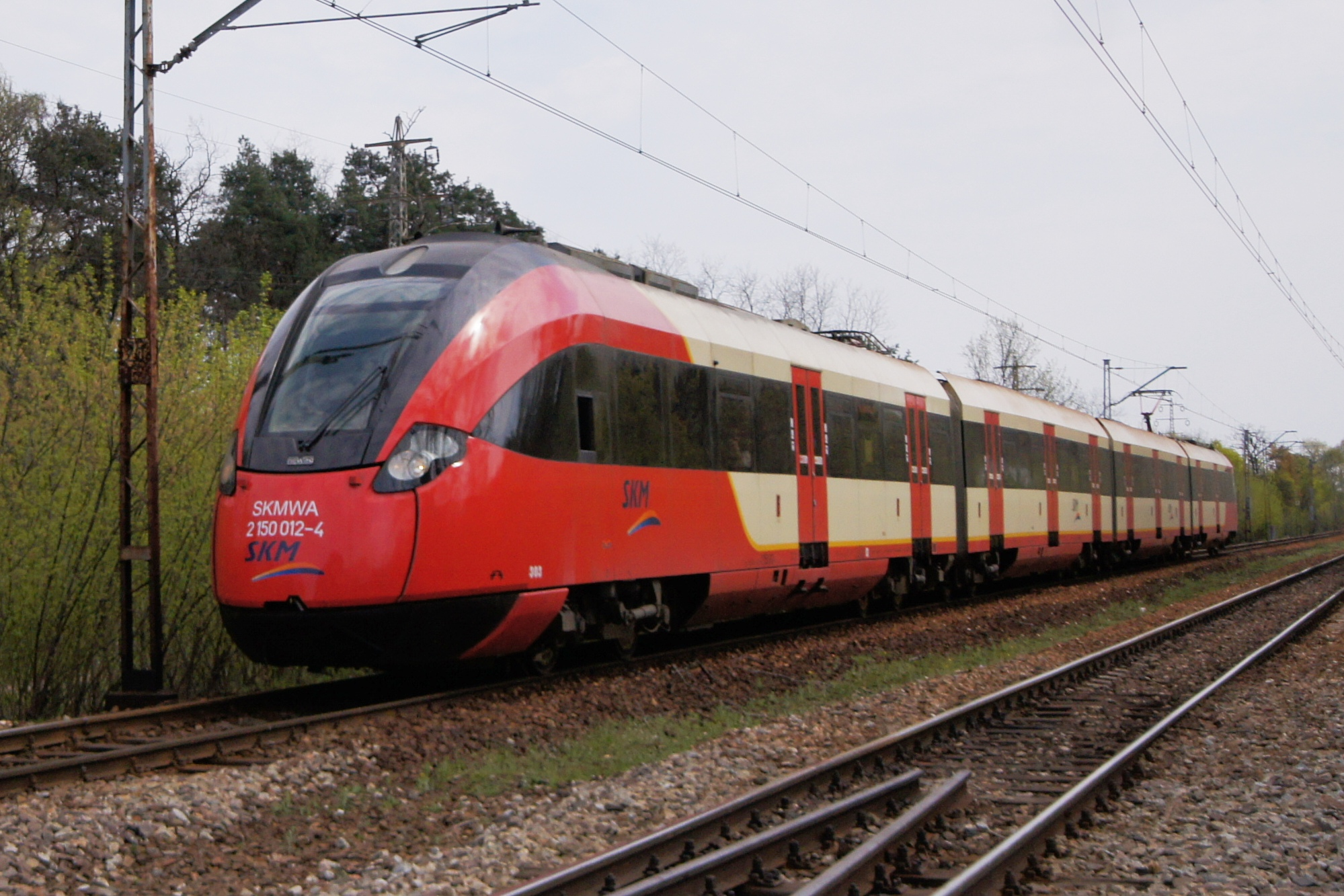
- 19WE unit
- Stock type: Electric multiple unit
- Manufacturer: Newag
- Assembly: Nowy Sącz, Poland
- Constructed: 2008–2010
- Capacity: 702 (5 people per m²)

Specifications
- Train length: 85,273 mm (279.767 ft)
- Width: 2,890 mm (9.48 ft)
- Height: 4,205 mm (13.796 ft)
- Platform height: 1,157 mm (3.796 ft)
- Wheel diameter: 920 mm (3.02 ft) (new); 870 mm (2.85 ft) (worn)
- Maximum speed: 130 km/h (81 mph)
- Weight: 190 t (420,000 lb)
- Engine type: Asynchronous 3-phase EMIT SXT315-L4C
- Power output: 3 kV DC
- Acceleration: 1.2 m/s²
- AAR wheel arrangement: s+d+d+s
- Braking system: Knorr-Bremse + ED

Newag 19WE is a standard-gauge, four-car electric multiple unit (EMU) produced between 2008 and 2010 at the Newag plant in Nowy Sącz. A total of 4 units were built, which are operated by Rapid Urban Railway (Warsaw) in Warsaw.

The prototype 19WE, after adding two middle cars, received the designation 20WE.

== History ==
=== Origins ===
After World War II, electric multiple units (EMUs) in Poland were produced exclusively by Pafawag in Wrocław until 1997. This company manufactured the most popular Polish EMU series, the EN57. Following the privatization of Pafawag in the 1990s, production of such vehicles ceased, with the last unit being the ED73 in 1997. For several years afterward, no EMUs were produced in Poland.

During this period, Polish State Railways (PKP) and later regional governments primarily purchased diesel railcars and diesel multiple units (DMUs) to operate on non-electrified lines, which were predominantly served by fuel-intensive locomotives. This allowed Polish manufacturers and operators to gain experience in producing and operating lightweight rolling stock. Additionally, existing EN57 units were modernized.

In 2004, Newag, in collaboration with Energocontrol Kraków, designed the first EMU of their own construction, the 14WE, which began production the following year using parts from scrapped EN57 units. In 2007, Newag began designing a completely new unit, the 19WE, in collaboration with the same company, then known as EC Engineering.

=== Production ===
Newag began building the prototype, funded by the manufacturer, in 2007. The unit was first presented on 10 September 2008 during the XVIII Economic Forum in Krynica-Zdrój, and its global premiere (in a shortened three-car version) occurred on September 23 at the InnoTrans trade fair in Berlin.

In the spring of 2009, the prototype was extended to a six-car version, designated as 20WE. In mid-May of that year, this unit was tested at the Railway Institute's experimental track in Węglewo near Żmigród and received an operating permit from the Office of Rail Transport.

On June 15, Rapid Urban Railway (Warsaw) in Warsaw ordered 4 units of the 19WE type. For the production of the first two units, parts from the prototype 20WE were used.

=== End of production ===
Subsequent tenders for Rapid Urban Railway (Warsaw) in Warsaw required low-floor units, disqualifying the 19WE/20WE. The first of these tenders, for 13 EMUs, was won by Pesa, which proposed the Elf model. The next tender, for 6 EMUs, was again won by Newag, but due to the low-floor requirement, Newag proposed a new type, the 35WE, later named Impuls. The 19WE served as the basis for the new design, with both trains sharing some common features.

Outside the Warsaw rail network, high platforms also exist in the Tricity area (on lines operated by Szybka Kolej Miejska in Tricity). However, instead of purchasing new units, the decision was made to modernize the existing ones.

=== Additional tests ===
In November 2010, Lower Silesian Railways announced a tender for the delivery of 5 EMUs. The tender specifications required proof of delivery of 5 EMUs with an operating permit for a speed of 160 km/h. Newag, not meeting this requirement, appealed to the National Appeal Chamber, resulting in a reduction of the experience requirement to 3 EMUs, but the speed requirement remained unchanged. To meet this requirement, Newag conducted additional tests on one of the 19WE units after adding a second driver's seat. As a result, the unit received an operating permit for 160 km/h, a speed for which it was originally designed, although not required by Rapid Urban Railway (Warsaw) in Warsaw. Ultimately, on 17 October 2011, Lower Silesian Railways signed a contract with Newag for the delivery of 5 EMUs of type 31WE.

== Construction ==
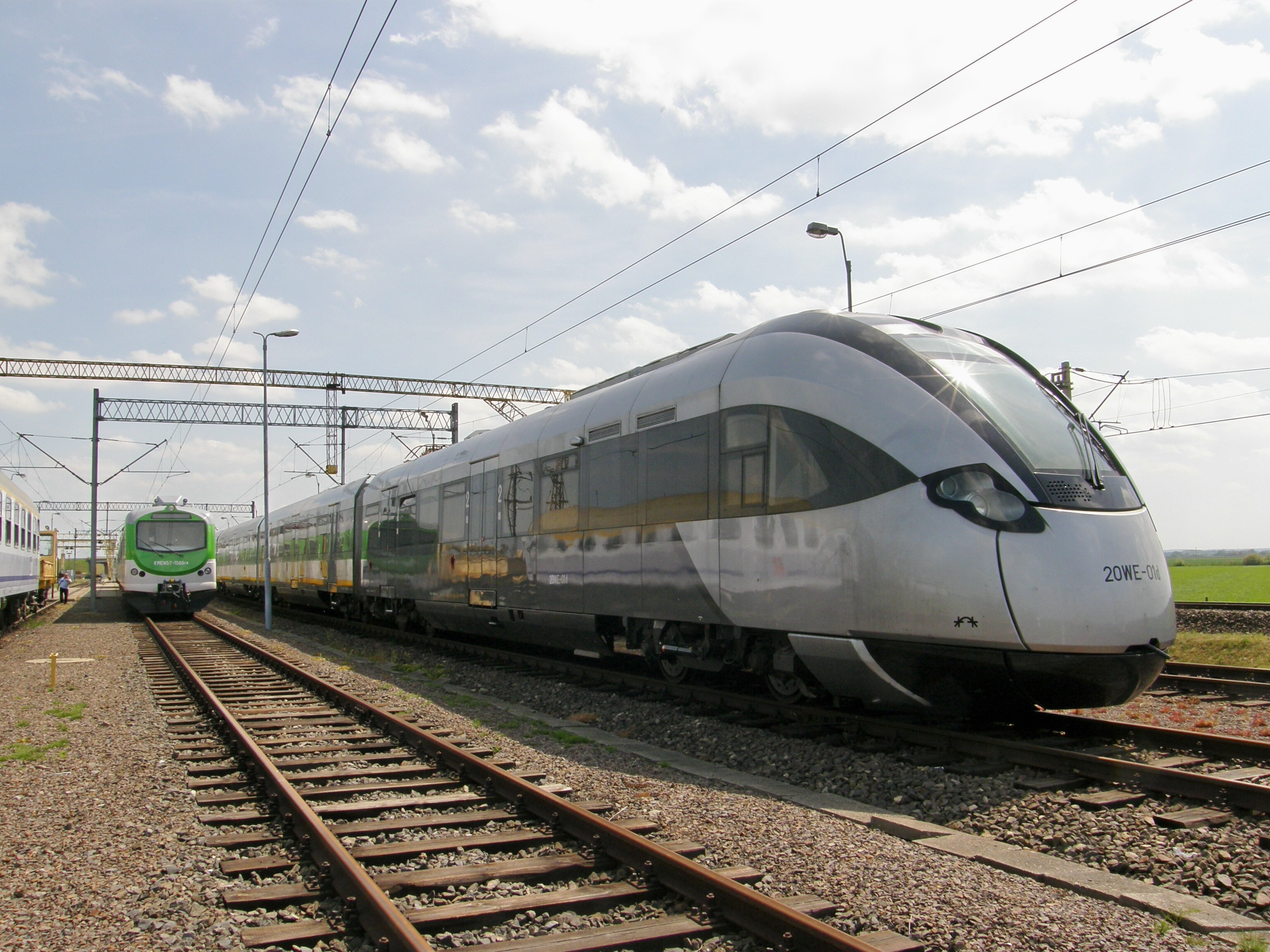
Prototype unit 20WE at the Test Track Centre near Żmigród

The 19WE/20WE are four-/six-car high-floor units designed for suburban passenger transport. The end cars (type 314B) have two pairs of sliding-plug doors (1,300 mm clearance, produced by Ultimate) per side, while the middle cars (type 414B) have three pairs of the same type of doors. The entrances are suitable for platform heights ranging from 760 to 1,060 mm, with steps deploying for lower platforms to facilitate boarding. Additionally, front vestibules are equipped with staff steps for crew boarding from the track level and passenger evacuation.

Due to the way the cars are connected (semi-permanent clutches by Voith joined with a drawbar clutch), it is not possible to shorten or lengthen the vehicle during operational conditions. However, it is possible to couple two vehicles of the same type for multiple-unit operation (digital control by Medcom) using a retractable automatic coupler (Scharfenberg system by Voith).

=== Safety ===
The car bodies meet the strength requirements of the PN-EN 12663:2002 standard (category P-II for multiple units). The driver’s cab is equipped with a roll cage, and energy absorbers are located under the cab. The vehicle was designed to comply with the crashworthiness standard EN 15227:2008.

The trains are equipped with standard train protection systems: active vigilance control, automatic train braking, and Radio-Stop. They use a radio system by Pyrylandia and a digital recorder ATM-RP3G by ATM Awionika. The driver’s cab includes two additional seats for assistant drivers.

=== Interior ===
The seating arrangement (produced by Kiel) is mixed – most seats are along the windows, while only in the end cars are they in a group arrangement. The aisle width in the passenger area is 800 mm. One of the end cars includes two positions for securing wheelchairs and a lift to assist wheelchair users in boarding. The trains are equipped with air conditioning (produced by Thermoking), forced-air heating, passenger information systems, four bicycle racks, a passenger counting system, ticket machines, video monitoring, and advertising monitors. The 19WE units do not have toilets (these are planned for long-distance versions).

At the end of 2015, one unit was equipped with USB chargers.

=== Drive parameters ===
Type	8 × ANT300-3000
Continuous power	2,195 kW
Hourly power	2,400 kW
Maximum power consumption	3,500 kW
Maximum torque (referred to motor shaft)	2,400 Nm
Starting acceleration (up to 6 km/h)	1.2 m/s²

=== Gearbox parameters ===
Type	SZH 495
Ratio	1:5.1757
Maximum input rotational speed	5,100/min
Maximum starting motor torque	2,500 Nm

=== Power and drive system ===
The power system was developed in cooperation with Medcom, which designed the main electrical network and supplied the traction inverters (FT-300-3000 with IGBT technology), static converters (PSM-60), high and low voltage distribution boards, and control panels. The vehicles use current collectors type DSA 200-PKP (produced by Stemmann).

The 19WE is equipped with 8 asynchronous motors (type SXT315-L4C, produced by EMIT). Each car rests on two two-axle bogies. For the end cars, these are powered bogies type 70RSNa, and for the middle cars, they are trailer bogies type 70RSTa. The powered bogies feature a two-stage SZH 495 gearbox (produced by Voith). The bogies have two suspension stages. The first stage consists of hydraulic dampers and coil springs, while the second stage includes hydraulic dampers and pneumatic cushions.

=== Braking system ===
The main brake used during service braking is the electrodynamic brake, with the electropneumatic brake used at lower speeds and during stops. The average energy recovered (fed back into the grid during braking) is 3.1 kWh/km (with an average energy consumption of 10.2 kWh/km).

The first two vehicles, due to the use of cars from the prototype 20WE-01, additionally have track brakes in the middle cars.

=== 20WE ===
The six-car version 20WE had a length of 119.82 m. The train had 282 seats and approximately 750 standing places (4 people/m²). The added cars did not have their own drive.

== Operation ==
Country	Operator	Quantity	Designation	UIC designation	Operational number
Poland	Rapid Urban Railway (Warsaw)	4	19WE-01	94 51 2 150 001 ÷ 004	301
Poland	Rapid Urban Railway (Warsaw)	4	19WE-02	94 51 2 150 005 ÷ 008	302
Poland	Rapid Urban Railway (Warsaw)	4	19WE-03	94 51 2 150 009 ÷ 012	303
Poland	Rapid Urban Railway (Warsaw)	4	19WE-04	94 51 2 150 013 ÷ 016	304

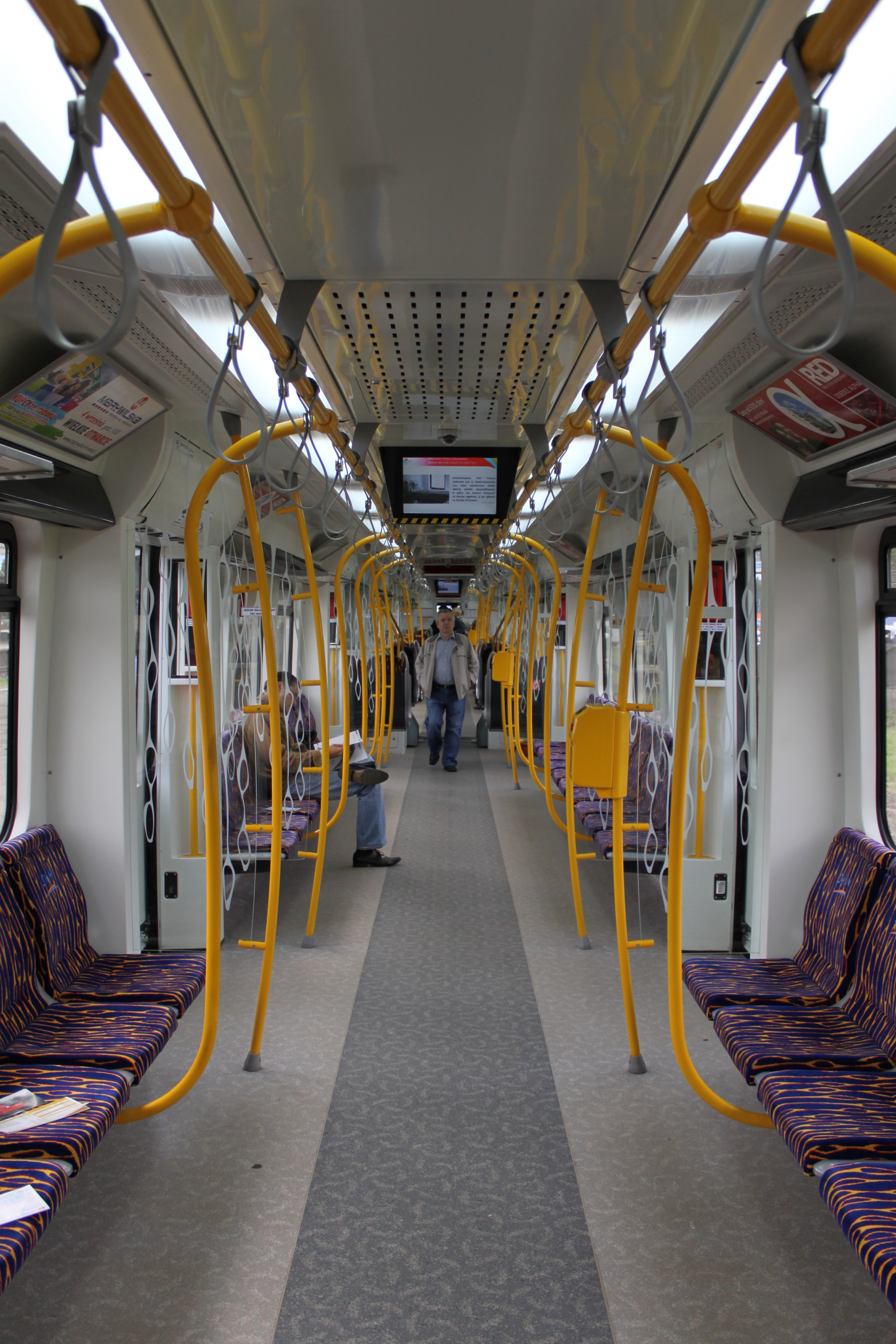
Interior

On 15 June 2009, the consortium of Newag and ING Group was selected in a tender for the 15-year leasing of 4 electric multiple units for the Rapid Urban Railway (Warsaw) in Warsaw.

The first unit was delivered on 5 April 2010 and began operating on the S2 line on April 9. The second 19WE was delivered on April 26 and started operating on the S2 line on April 29. The third unit began service on the S2 line on May 18. The fourth and final unit entered service on June 11. On 11 December 2011, all four units were reassigned to the S1 line.

On 23 May 2012, between the Warszawa Zoo railway station and the Warszawa Praga railway station, train number 303 collided with an Elf train of Masovian Railways (EN76-012). As a result of the accident, a passenger on the 19WE and a passenger on the Elf were injured. The 19WE unit returned from repair on June 8.
