= Newag 222M =

Diesel multiple unit produced by Newag

222M
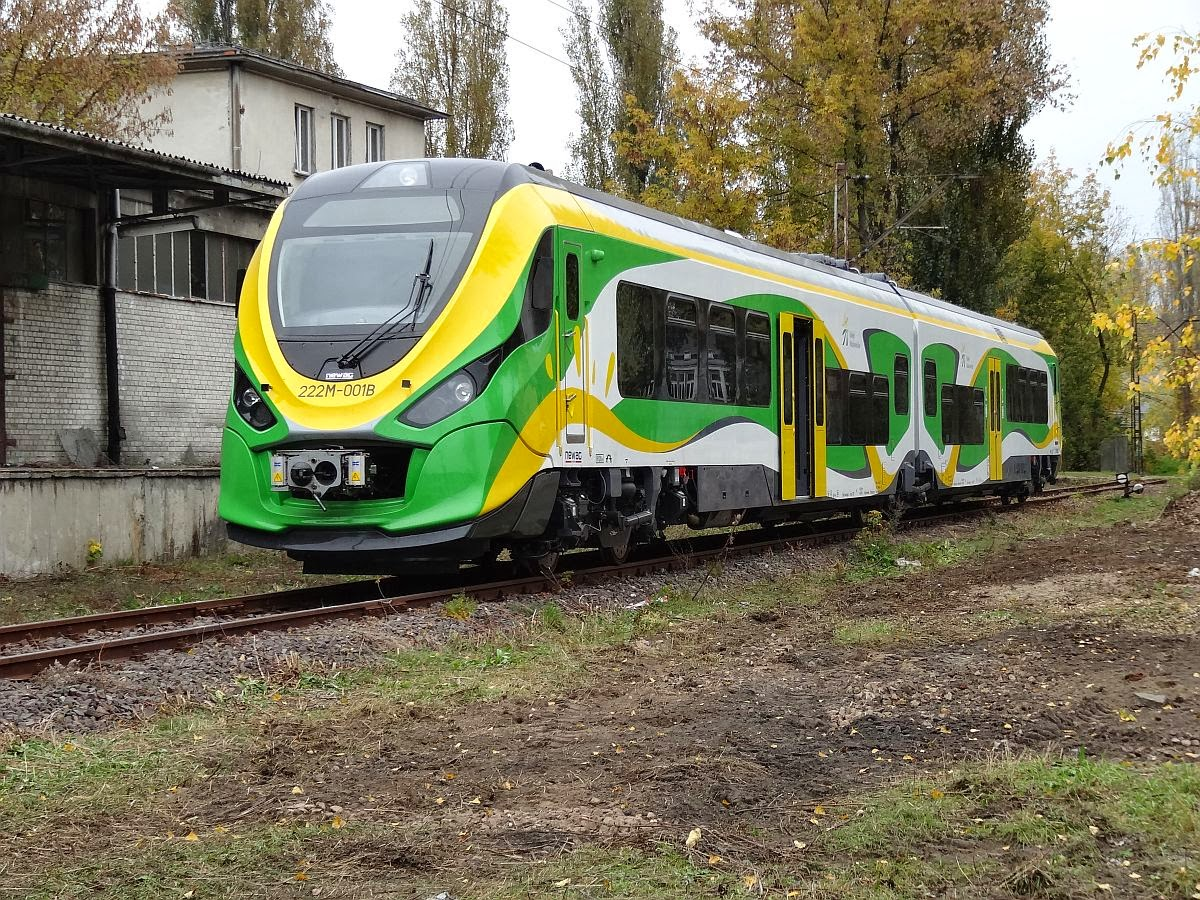
- 222M-001 at Olszynka Grochowska in Warsaw
- Stock type: diesel multiple unit
- Manufacturer: Newag
- Assembly: Nowy Sącz, Poland
- Constructed: since 2013
- Number built: 6
- Capacity: 266–270

Specifications
- Train length: 43,000 m (141,000 ft)
- Width: 2,840 mm (112 in)
- Height: 3,910 mm (154 in)
- Floor height: 600 mm (24 in)
- Maximum speed: 130 km/h (81 mph)
- Weight: 88.5 t (195,000 lb)
- Engine type: MTU Powerpack
- Acceleration: 0.45 m/s²
- Electric system: 2×390 kW
- AAR wheel arrangement: B’2’B’

Newag 222M (SA140 series) is a two-car diesel multiple unit produced by the Newag company from Nowy Sącz. Two units were manufactured for Masovian Railways, and four more for the Subcarpathian Voivodeship.

== History ==
=== Origins ===
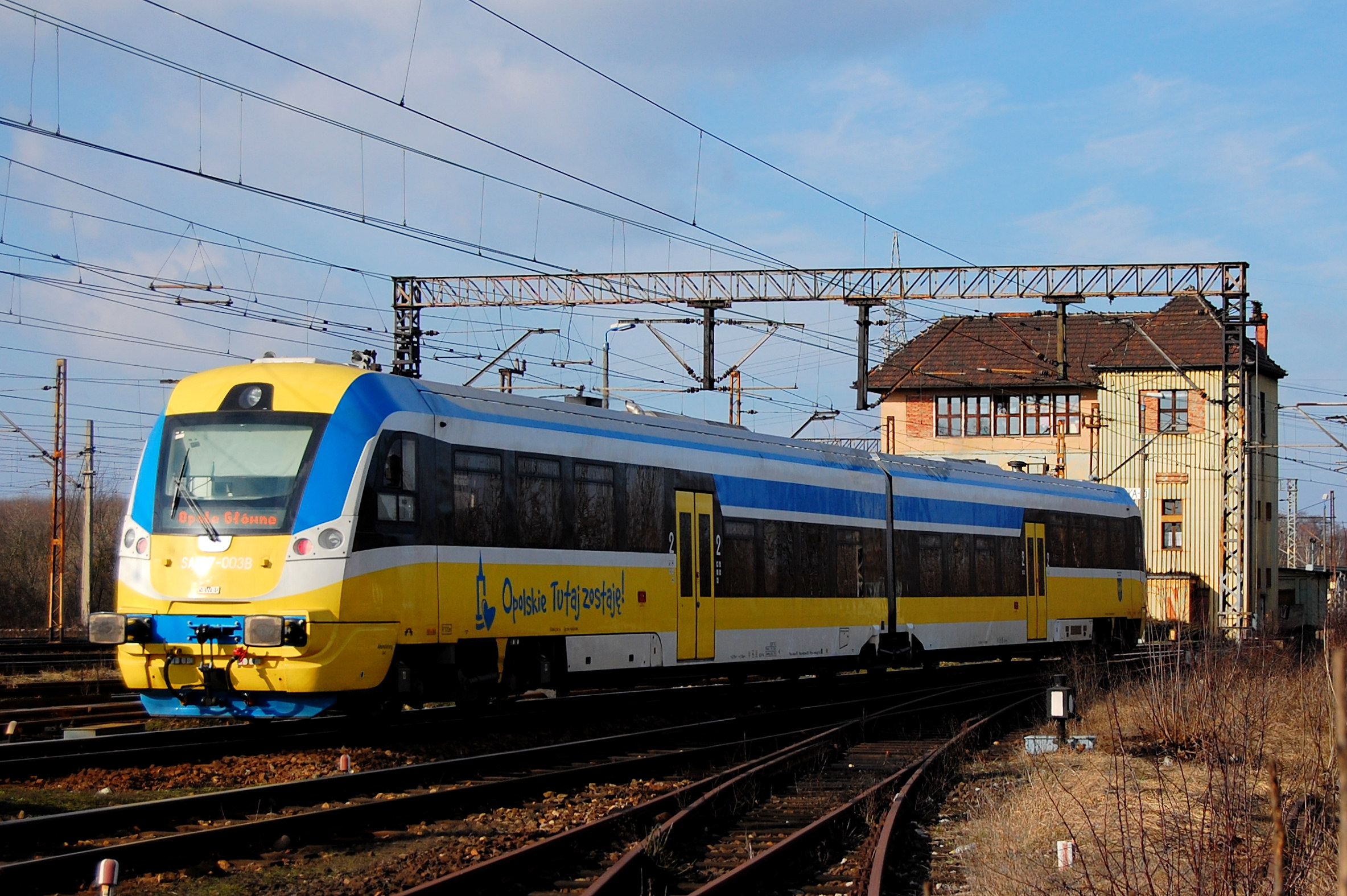
220M diesel multiple unit

In September 2009, the Pomeranian Voivodeship announced a tender for two- and three-car diesel multiple units (DMUs). Newag, aiming to enter a new market, collaborated with Kraków-based EC Engineering to design these vehicles (models 220M and 221M) and began production in February 2010, even before signing a contract with the Pomeranian Voivodeship on 21 May 2010. Newag went on to sell more DMUs from the 220M/221M family, including one to the Lubusz and Silesian voivodeships. The 222M model, which meets TSI standards and includes the "four collision scenario", is an advanced development of these earlier models, also designed by EC Engineering.

=== Unsuccessful tenders ===
Before signing its first contract for the 222M DMU, Newag won two tenders offering this model but failed to finalize contracts. In May 2012, Newag submitted the winning bid for two DMUs for the West Pomeranian Voivodeship but backed out of signing the contract. Consequently, on 2 July 2012, the voivodeship signed the deal with Pesa. A similar situation occurred in the Lubusz Voivodeship, where Newag won a tender for four units in January 2013 but again refrained from signing, leading the voivodeship to sign with Pesa on 15 March 2013.

=== Production and testing ===
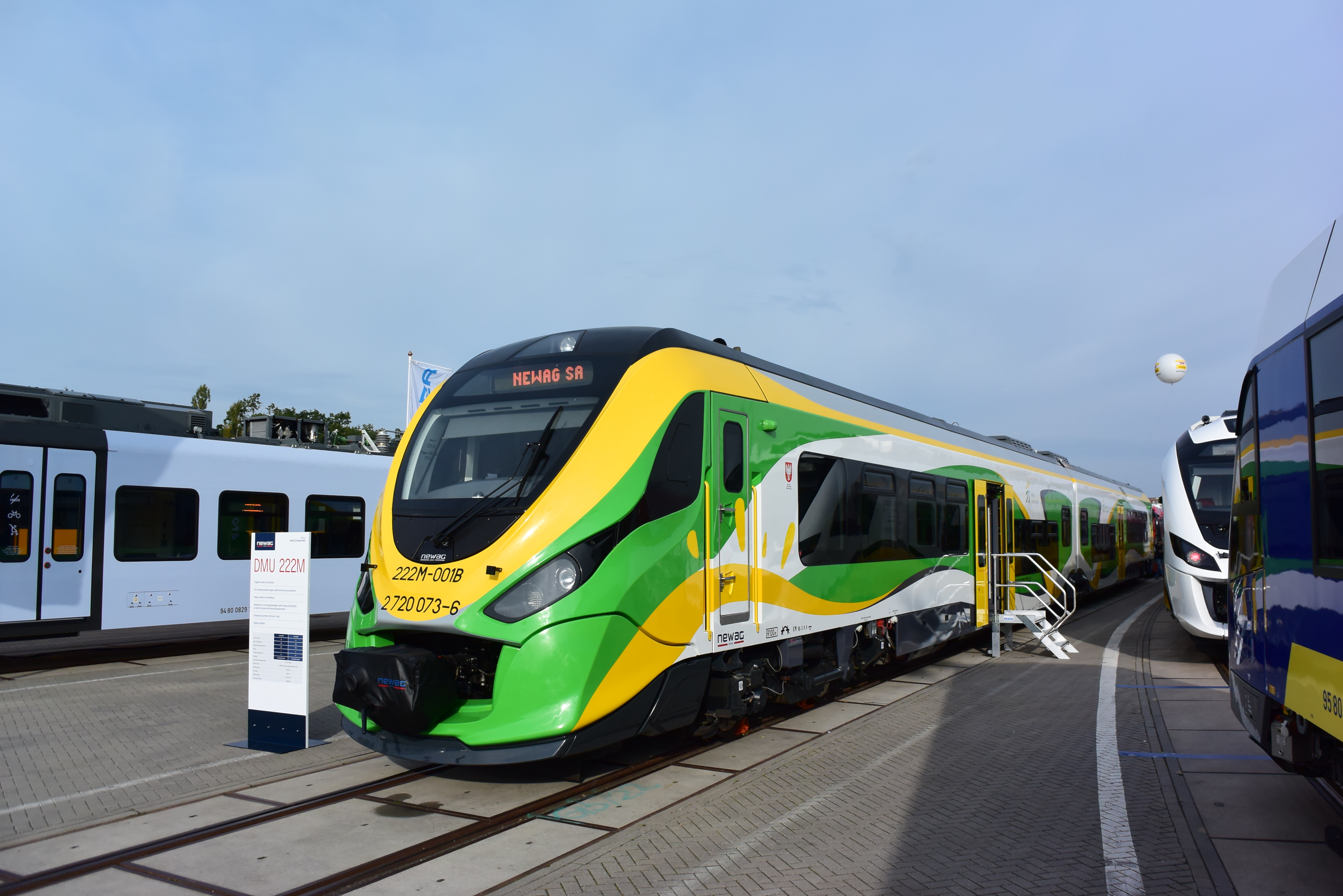
222M-001 at the InnoTrans trade fair

The first 222M unit was successfully contracted by the Masovian Railways on 18 June 2013. In October 2013, the vehicle underwent testing in Kraków, Grybów, and Olsztyn. Later that month, it was tested at the Test Track Centre near Żmigród, remaining there until October 29. On November 20, the vehicle received certification for operation on the PKP Polskie Linie Kolejowe network.

=== Further orders ===
On 16 June 2015, Newag signed a contract with Masovian Railways for another 222M unit. In early 2017 and mid-2019, Newag signed contracts for the delivery of two 222Ma DMUs for the Subcarpathian Voivodeship.

== Construction ==
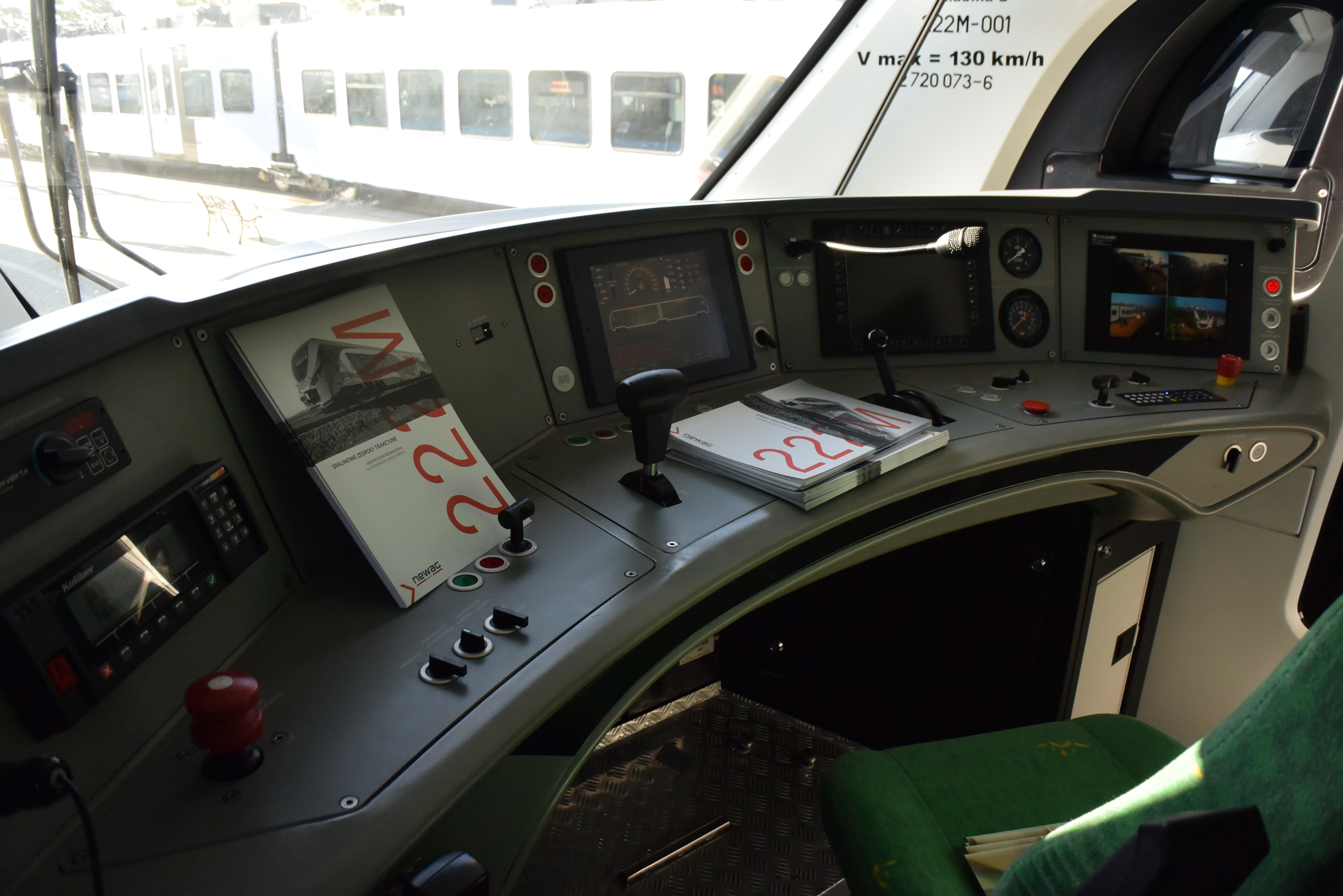
Driver’s cabin

The Newag 222M is a two-car, single-space, partially low-floor diesel multiple unit designed for regional services on non-electrified lines. It is designed to accommodate platforms with heights ranging from 550 to 900 mm.

=== Interior ===
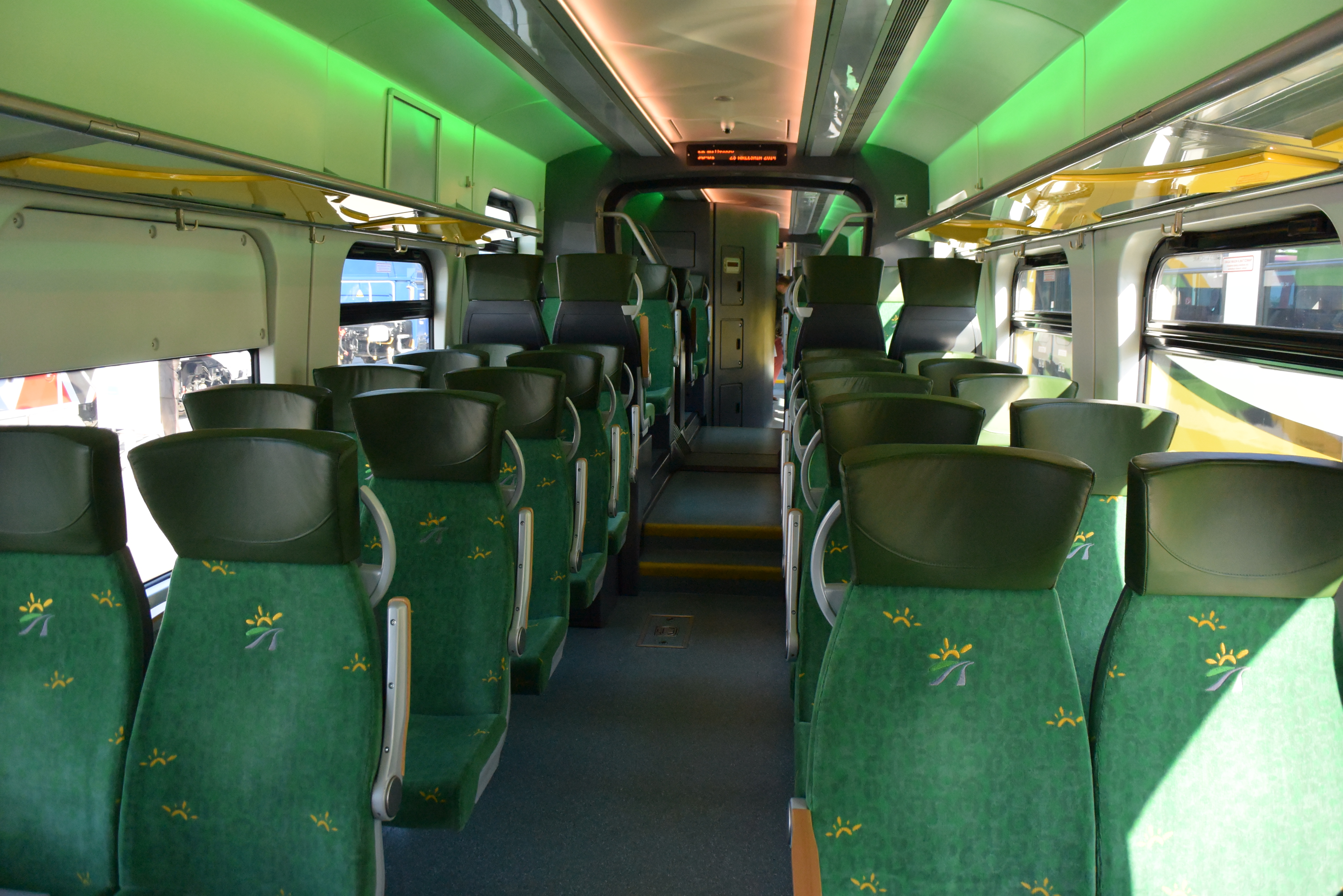
Interior

Access to the 222M interior is provided through a pair of sliding doors on the side of the vehicle, each 1,300 mm wide with a step 600 mm above the rail head.

The vehicle is adapted for transporting passengers with mobility impairments. It includes a platform at one set of doors to facilitate boarding, a dedicated area for a wheelchair, and a TSI PRM-compliant accessible toilet.

Additionally, the unit is equipped with forced-air heating, dual-zone air conditioning, 230 V power sockets, a passenger information system, and surveillance cameras.

=== Chassis and drive ===
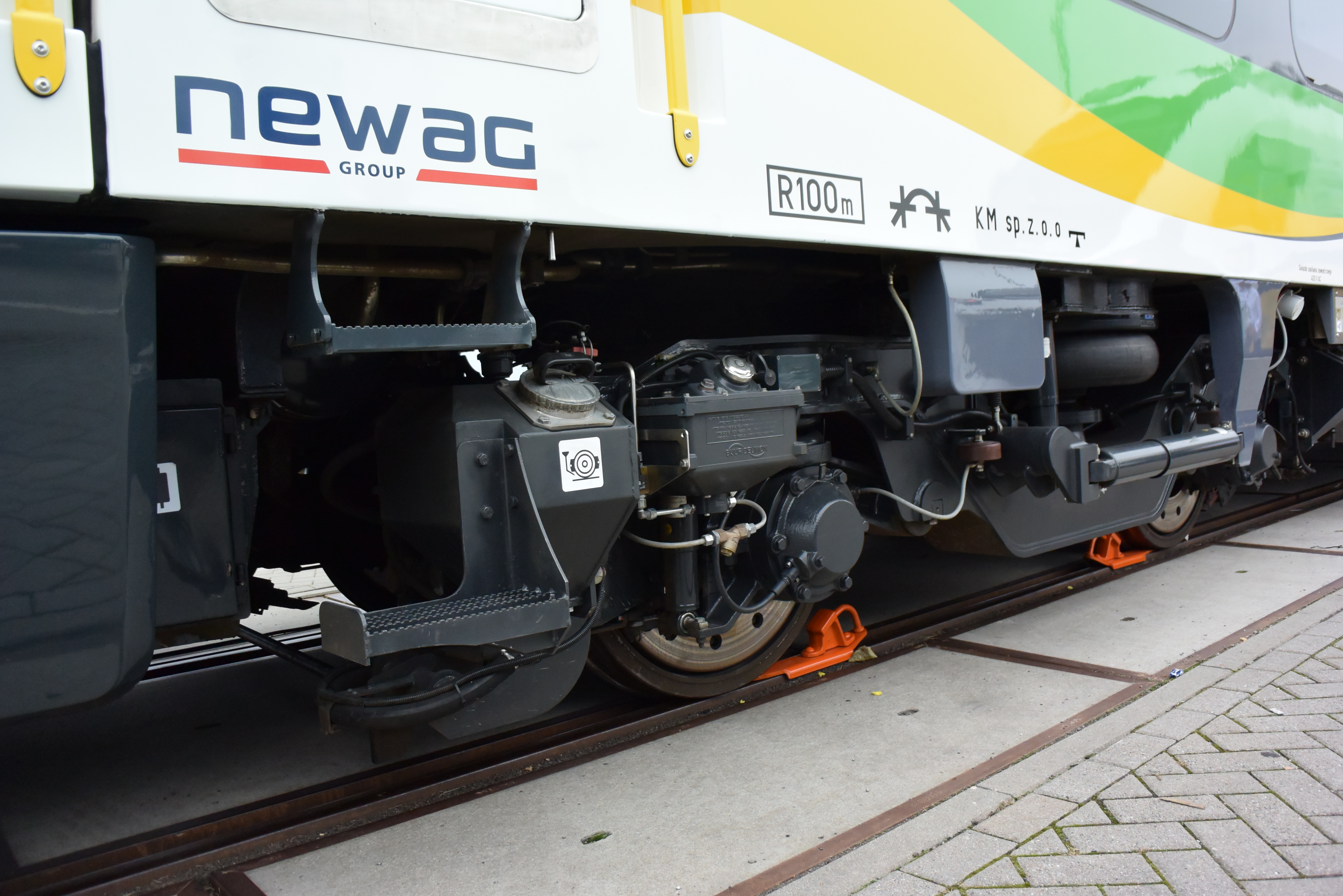
Drive bogie

The two-car unit is based on three two-axle bogies: two end drive bogies (type 74RSNa) and a shared middle, non-powered bogie in the Jacobs system (type 72RSTa), which supports both cars.

The propulsion system includes two drive units with a 390 kW diesel engine, an automatic hydrodynamic transmission with a retarder. The engines meet Stage IIIB emissions standards.

The 222M body meets the following standards: structural strength (PII according to EN 12663), fire resistance (PN-K 02511), and crashworthiness (EN 15227) for four collision scenarios.

Operation

Owner	Operator	Type	Operator’s designation	Number	Years of delivery	Sources
Masovian Voivodeship	Masovian Railways	222M	222M-001 ÷ 002	2	2013, 2015	
Subcarpathian Voivodeship	Polregio	222Ma	SA140-001 ÷ 004	4	2018, 2020	

=== Masovian Voivodeship ===
On 18 June 2013, a contract was signed with the Masovian Voivodeship for the delivery of one two-car DMU. The livery for the 222M was selected through a competition.

On 16 June 2015, Newag signed a contract with Masovian Railways for the delivery of an additional 222M, identical to the previous one, which was to be delivered by the end of 2015. The unit was received by the operator on 10 December 2015.

On 16 January 2024, unit number 002 suffered partial fire damage near Kaczorowy during a service run.

=== Subcarpathian Voivodeship ===
In early 2017, the Marshal's Office of the Subcarpathian Voivodeship signed a contract with Newag for the delivery of two 222Ma units, with the first scheduled for delivery by the end of February 2018 and the second by the end of March 2018. On 30 March 2018, both vehicles were officially delivered, receiving a new series designation – SA140. A formal handover took place on 5 April 2018 at Rzeszów Główny railway station. Both units were assigned to Polregio for the Rzeszów–Stalowa Wola and Rzeszów–Sandomierz routes.

On 31 July 2019, a contract was signed for the delivery of two additional 222Ma DMUs, which were delivered to the customer in early October 2020.
