= Newag 6Dl =

Locomotive from the SM42 series

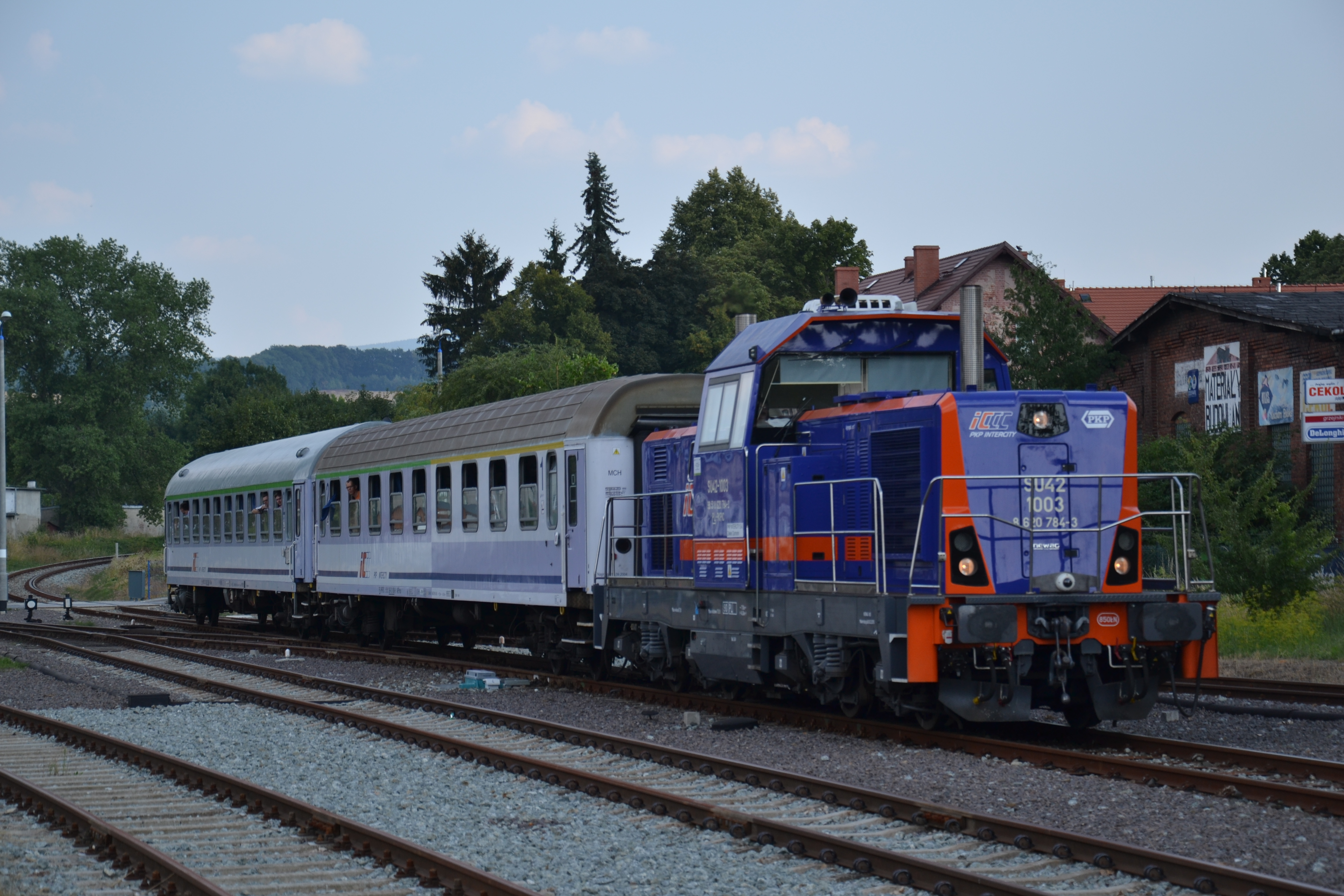
- SU42-1003
Type and origin
- Power type: Diesel
- Builder: Newag, Fablok
- Model: Fablok 6D
- Rebuild date: 2014–2015
- Number rebuilt: 10
Specifications
- Configuration
  - UIC: Bo′Bo′
- Gauge: 1,435 mm (4 ft 8 1/2 in) standard gauge
- Length
  - Over buffers: 14,240 mm (46 ft 9 in)
- Width: 3,130 mm (10 ft 3 in)
- Axle load: 17.5 t (17.2 long tons; 19.3 short tons)
- Loco weight: 70 t (69 long tons; 77 short tons)
- Prime mover: 2 x Caterpillar C18
- RPM range: 1,800 rpm (30 Hz)
- MU working: Yes
- Train heating: Electric
- Loco brake: Knorr-Bremse air brake
Performance figures
- Maximum speed: 90 km/h (56 mph)
- Power output: 563 kW (755 hp)
- Tractive effort
  - Starting: 219 kN (49,000 lbf)
Career
- Operators: PKP Intercity
- Numbers: SU42-1001–1010

The Newag 6Dl is a locomotive class rebuilt from the SM42 series and equipped with two diesel engines. The locomotive follows the Newag 6Dg and the Newag 18D, and is able to provide electric train heating to the carriages. This is the first Newag locomotive which has bumpers (shock absorbers) to absorb collision energy.

== History ==
In September 2013, PKP Intercity contracted Newag to convert 10 of its SM42 diesel locomotives with a twin-engine configuration and electric train heating. At the end of 2013, conversion work had started, and was completed in May 2015.

Table of locomotives
Post-rebuild number	Pre-rebuild number	Built	Rebuilt
SU42-1001	SM42-576	1973	12 August 2014
SU42-1002	SM42-643	1973	31 January 2015
SU42-1003	SM42-179	1969	6 March 2015
SU42-1004	SM42-574	1973	3 March 2015
SU42-1005	SM42-1008	1978	26 March 2015
SU42-1006	SM42-429	1971	3 April 2015
SU42-1007	SM42-189	1969	14 April 2015
SU42-1008	SM42-563	1973	23 April 2015
SU42-1009	SM42-604	1973	6 May 2015
SU42-1010	SM42-530	1972	12 May 2015

== Specification ==
The modernisation involved work on an entirely new body on the existing chassis, with the use of fuel tanks, which were included in the modernisation. The locomotive uses two Caterpillar C18 diesel engines with a capacity of 563 kW connected to synchronous generators. Each of the units included a new exhaust system, which is supported on the refuge. The engine exhaust systems with the diesel filters are DOC types. Built-in power generators can operate in two configurations: the first uses the power of both motors for traction, the second uses the power of the traction to power the cabin of the train.

== Problems ==
In 2020, there have been problems with the mechanism of some locomotives, which caused the trains to be delayed, being hauled by other locomotives, or in some cases, replaced by bus transport.
