= Żmigród Test Track Centre =

Railway test track in Poland

Coordinates: 51.4656°N 16.8472°E

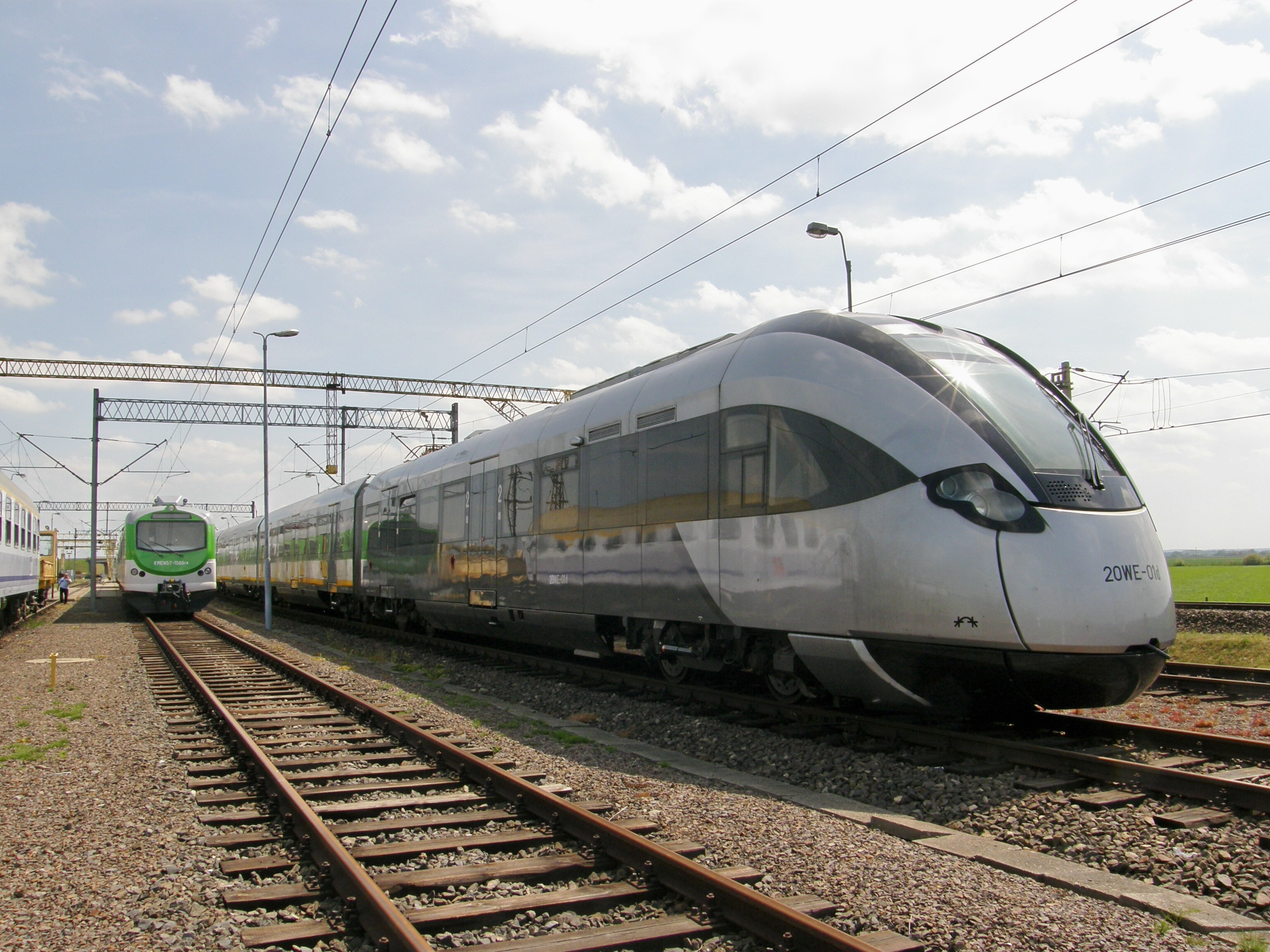
Newag 20WE

Test Track Centre near Żmigród is located in Węglewo in south-western Poland, some 3 km (2 mi) from Żmigród and some 50 km (30 mi) from Wrocław, near the Wrocław–Poznań railway line, with which it is connected by a spur. When opened in 1996, it was the only such facility in Poland. It is owned by the Railway Institute. The standard gauge loop is 7,725 m (4.8 mi) long with a maximum allowed speed of 160 km/h (99 mph) on straight sections.

The facility is used to test rolling stock, overhead lines and electrification systems, and railway tracks. Original project provided for the building of the second oval, some 40 km (25 mi) long, with a maximum allowed speed of 300 km/h (190 mph) on straight sections and 200 km/h (120 mph) over points (US: switches), but it has been shelved.

There are plans to add 1.5 kV DC and 15 and 25 kV AC overhead supply systems, and GSM-R and ETCS level 2 systems.
