= Silesian Railways =

Regional rail operator in Silesian Voivodeship in Poland

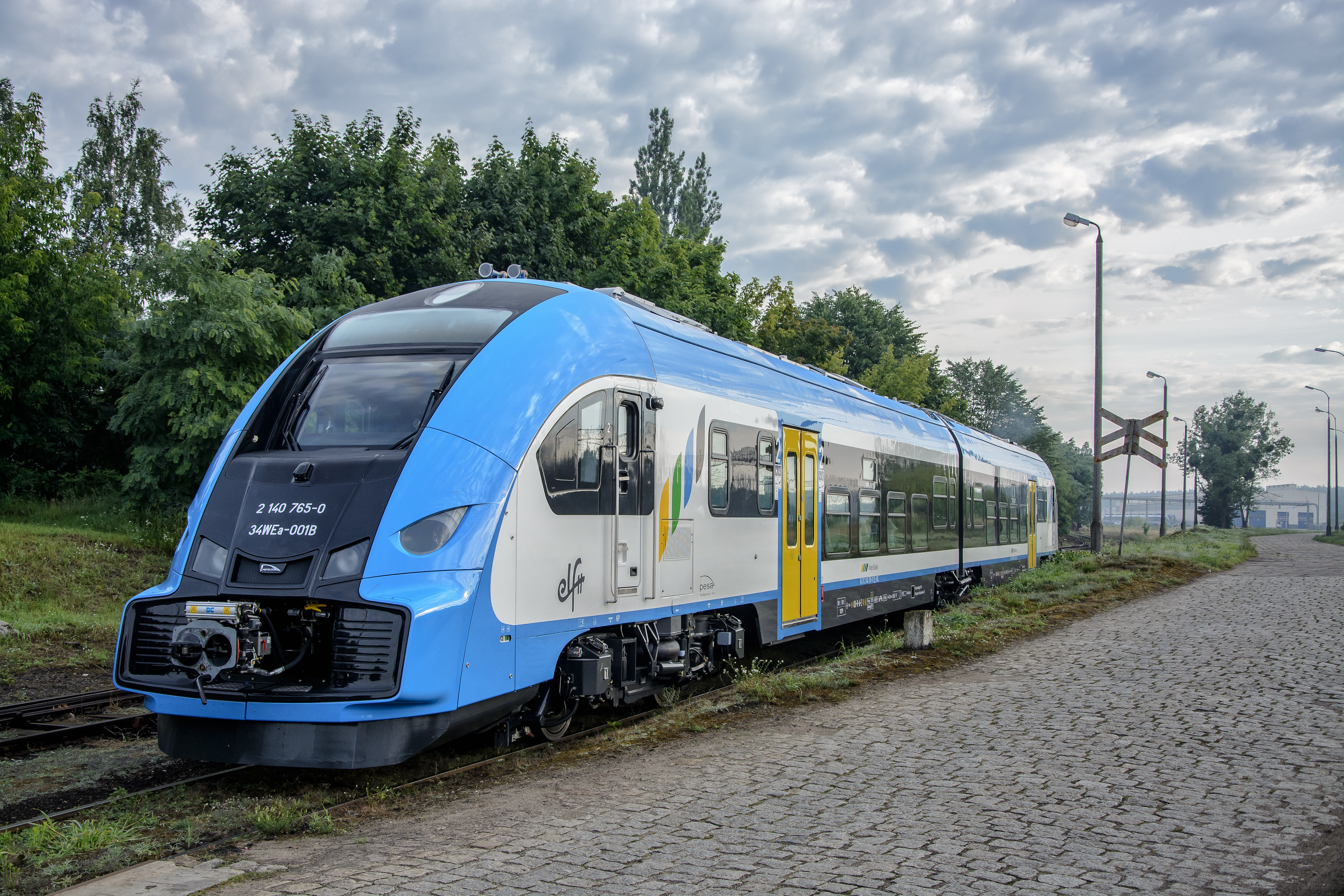
- Pesa Elf 34WEa of Silesian Railways
- Native name: Koleje Śląskie
- Type: Private limited company
- Industry: Rail transport
- Founded: 2010
- Headquarters: Katowice, Poland
- Area served: Silesian Voivodeship
- Key people: Krzysztof Klimosz (Prezes Zarządu)
- Owner: Silesian Voivodeship
- Website: kolejeslaskie.pl/en

Silesian Railways (Polish: Koleje Śląskie; KŚ) is a regional rail operator in the Silesian Voivodeship of Poland. The company was founded in 2010 and is fully owned by the Silesian Voivodeship. It commenced services in October 2011.

== Routes ==
Source: Timetable of the Silesian Railways – Silesian Railways

- S1 Gliwice – Katowice – Częstochowa
- S3 Katowice – Kraków Płaszów
- S6 Katowice – Wisła Głębce
- S7 Katowice – Rybnik – Racibórz
- S8 Chorzów Batory – Tarnowskie Góry – Lubliniec
- S9 Chorzów Batory – Tarnowskie Góry – Katowice Airport – Częstochowa
- S13 Częstochowa – Lubliniec
- S17 Gliwice – Rybnik – Wodzisław Śląski
- S18 Gliwice – Bytom
- S19 Katowice Airport – Dąbrowa Górnicza Ząbkowice – Sosnowiec – Katowice – Gliwice
- S31 Mysłowice – Oświęcim
- S34 Częstochowa – Zawiercie – Trzebinia – Kraków Płaszów
- S51 Częstochowa – Katowice – Bielsko-Biała – Zakopane
- S61 Czechowice-Dziedzice – Zebrzydowice – Cieszyn
- S62 Skoczów – Goleszów – Cieszyn
- S71 Katowice – Rybnik – Wodzisław Śląski – Chałupki – Bohumín
- S72 Rybnik – Żory
- S74 Tychy – Orzesze Jaśkowice
- S75 Gliwice – Rybnik – Chybie – Bielsko-Biała – Zwardoń
- S76 Gliwice – Rybnik – Chybie – Wisła Głębce
- S77 Racibórz – Rybnik – Chybie – Wisła Głębce
- S78 Racibórz – Chałupki

== Rolling stock ==
Family	Class	Image	Cars	Top speed		Number	Builder	Refurbished by
Family	Class	Image	Cars	km/h	mph	Number	Builder	Refurbished by
EN57	EN57AKŚ		3	120	75	7	Pafawag	Newag, Newag Gliwice
EN57	EN57KM		3	110	69	2	Pafawag	Pesa Mińsk Mazowiecki
EN57	EN71AKŚ		4	120	75	2	Pafawag	Newag
Stadler FLIRT	EN75		4	160	100	4	Stadler Rail	–
–	14WE		3	110	70	2	Newag	–
Newag Impuls	31WEbc		4	160	100	5 (out of 35)	Newag	–
Newag Impuls	35WE		6	160	100	1	Newag	–
Newag Impuls	36WEa		6	160	100	1	Newag	–
Pesa Elf	EN76		4	160	100	9	Pesa	–
Pesa Elf	21WEa		3	160	100	5	Pesa	–
Pesa Elf	22WEd		4	160	100	12	Pesa	–
Pesa Elf	27WEb		6	160	100	6	Pesa	–
Pesa Elf	34WEa		2	160	100	4	Pesa	–

== See also ==
- Lower Silesian Railways
- Pesa Elf
