= Nevelo =

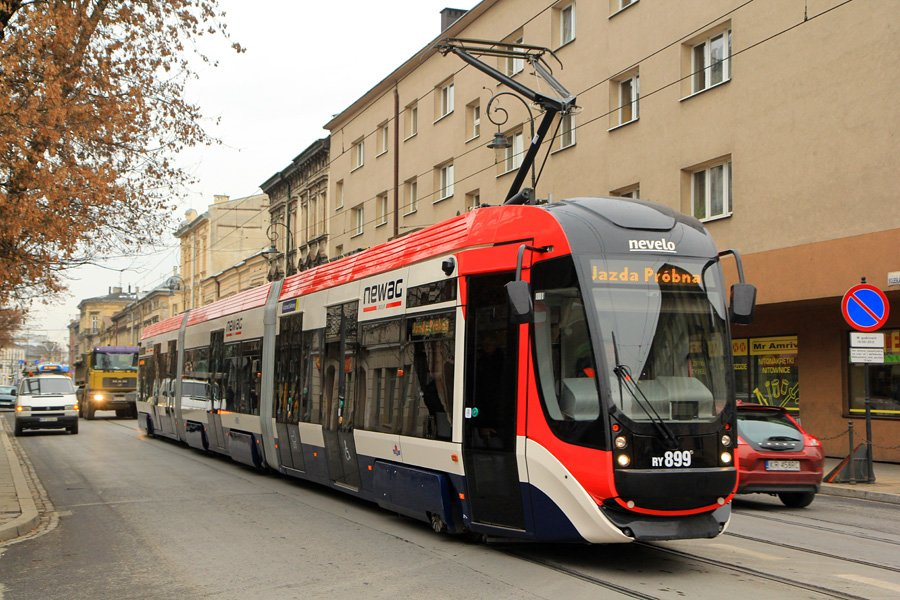
Newag Nevelo

The Nevelo is a tram designed by Newag and built in its Nowy Sącz factory.

== History ==
In May 2013, the first complete tram was taken to Kraków for trial running.

== Technology ==
The Nevelo is a three-section, articulated, 100% low-floor pivoting bogie tram that accommodates 60 seated passengers and 175 standing. It has several features designed to lower operating costs, including regeneration with supercapacitor energy storage. The wheels and suspension are claimed to reduce wear. It has wide doors and ramps for wheelchair accessibility.
