= Newag Vulcano =

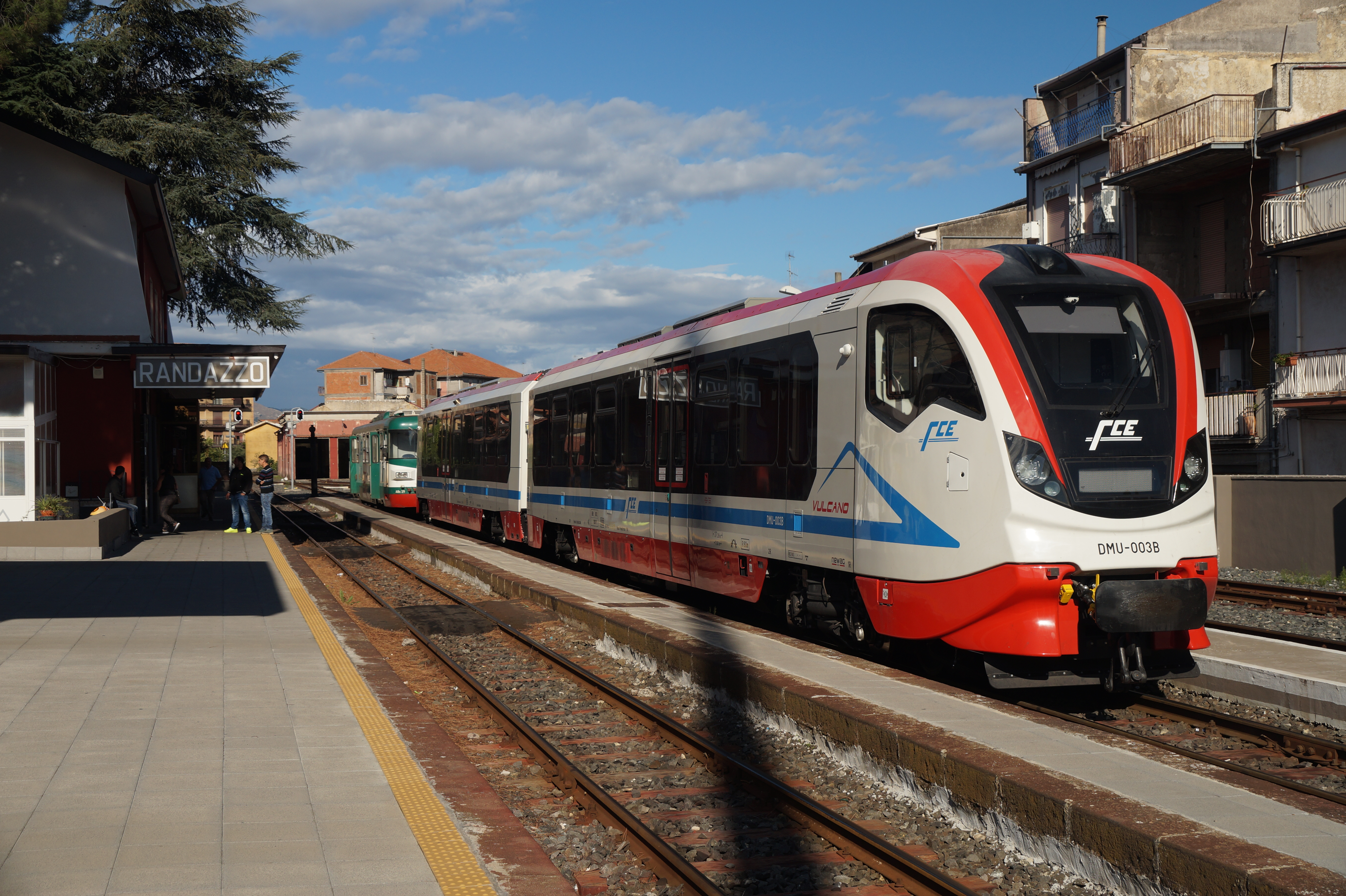
- The DMU 003, Named Vulcano, at the FCE Randazzo station.
- Manufacturer: Newag
- Entered service: 2016 (currently out of service)
- Number under construction: 4
- Number built: 4
- Number in service: 4
- Capacity: 106 (seated); 172 (total)
- Operators: Ferrovia Circumetnea

Specifications
- Car length: 37.26 m (122 ft 3 in)
- Width: 2.526 m (8 ft 3.4 in)
- Height: 3.53 m (11 ft 7 in)
- Doors: 2 per side
- Articulated sections: 2
- Wheelbase: 11.6 m (38 ft) between bogie centres
- Maximum speed: 100 km/h (62 mph)
- Weight: 68.8 t (152,000 lb)
- Engine type: Diesel
- Power output: 2 × 390 kW (520 hp)
- UIC classification: Bo'Bo'+Bo'Bo'
- Track gauge: 950 mm

The Newag Vulcano (series DMU 001-004), is a diesel multiple unit railcar, built by Polish manufacturer Newag for the Ferrovia Circumetnea of Catania.

The Vulcano was introduced in December 2013, when Italian railroad Ferrovia Circumetnea ordered four two-car trainsets. The first unit from the order was delivered two years later, and Vulcanos began revenue service in May 2016. In December 2017, Ferrovia Circumetnea placed an order for four more trainsets, three of which were contingent on obtaining financing.

The Vulcano is based on a design from bankrupt Italian manufacturer Costa Sistemi Ferroviari. Each 950 mm gauge train set has two diesel engines, and can transport 106 passengers at a speed of up to 100 kilometres per hour (62 mph).
