= Newag 220M/221M =

Train Model

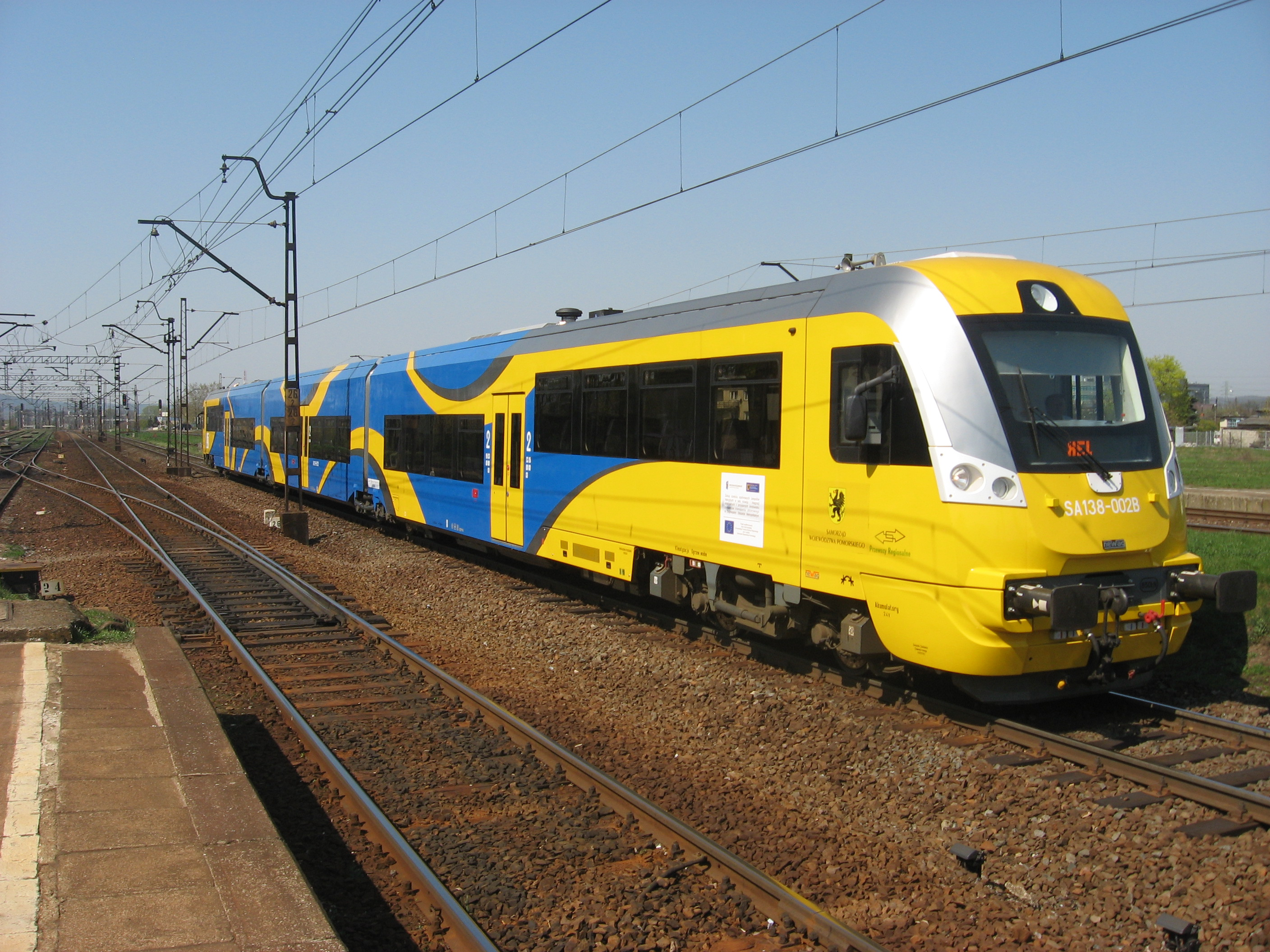
- Manufacturer: Newag
- Number built: 14

Specifications
- Car length: 220M: 41 800 mm 221M: 58 360 mm
- Width: 2850 mm
- Height: 3900 mm
- Maximum speed: 120 km/h (75 mph)
- Weight: 220M: 82 t (81 long tons; 90 short tons); 221M: 105 t (103 long tons; 116 short tons)

Newag 220M/221M is a series of diesel multiple units, they are two and three-section passenger trains which have been manufactured since 2010. They are designed for suburban and long-distance passenger transit. They are low-floor, open-coach units produced by Newag in Nowy Sącz in Poland. Altogether 9 units have been produced which are operated by Polregio and Silesian Railways.

== History ==
In September 2009, the Pomeranian Voivodeship in Poland announced a tender for two and three-section diesel multiple units. Newag, in order to enter a new market, went in cooperation with EC Engineering Company which has designed the units and started their production in February 2010, before signing an agreement with the local government in the Pomeranian Voivodeship, which took place on May 21. The first produced 221M was transferred to InnoTrans Trade Fair in Berlin in September 2010.

Altogether the 220M / 221M series has had 5 orders:

- May 21, 2010 - signing of the contract for the supply of 2 220M and 4 221M for the Pomeranian Voivodeship.
- September 28, 2010 - signing of a contract for the supply of 2 220M for the Opole Voivodeship.
- April 17, 2011 - signing of a contract for the supply of one 220M for the Lubusz Voivodeship.
- November 30, 2012 - signing of a contract for the supply of 221M Silesian Voivodeship.
- May 17, 2013 - signing of a contract for the supply of lease 4 220M for Polregio.

=== Successor ===
The tender for Koleje Mazowieckie has proposed a new unit for Newag - the 222m, the deal was signed on 18 June 2013.

== Construction ==
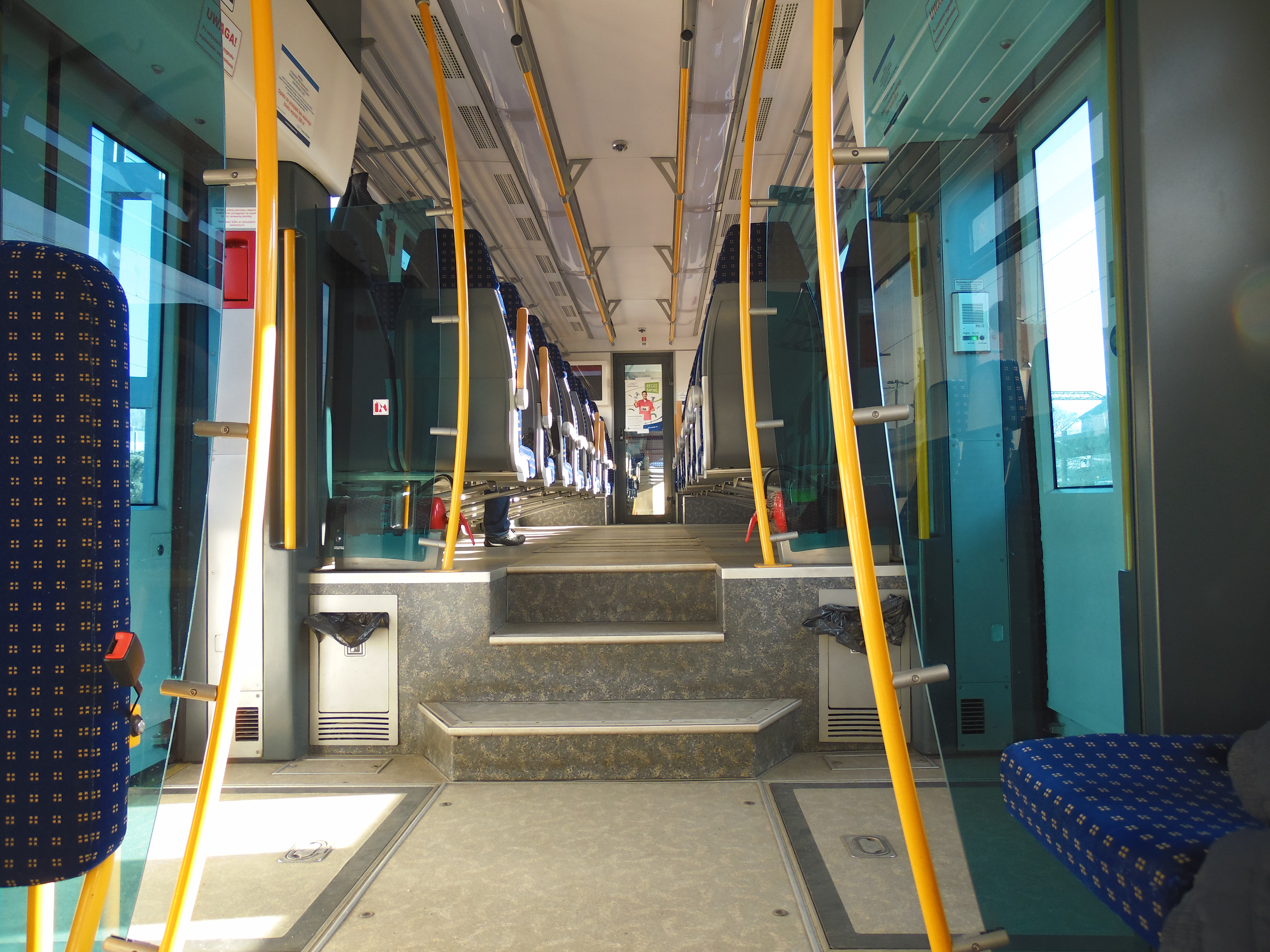
Interior.

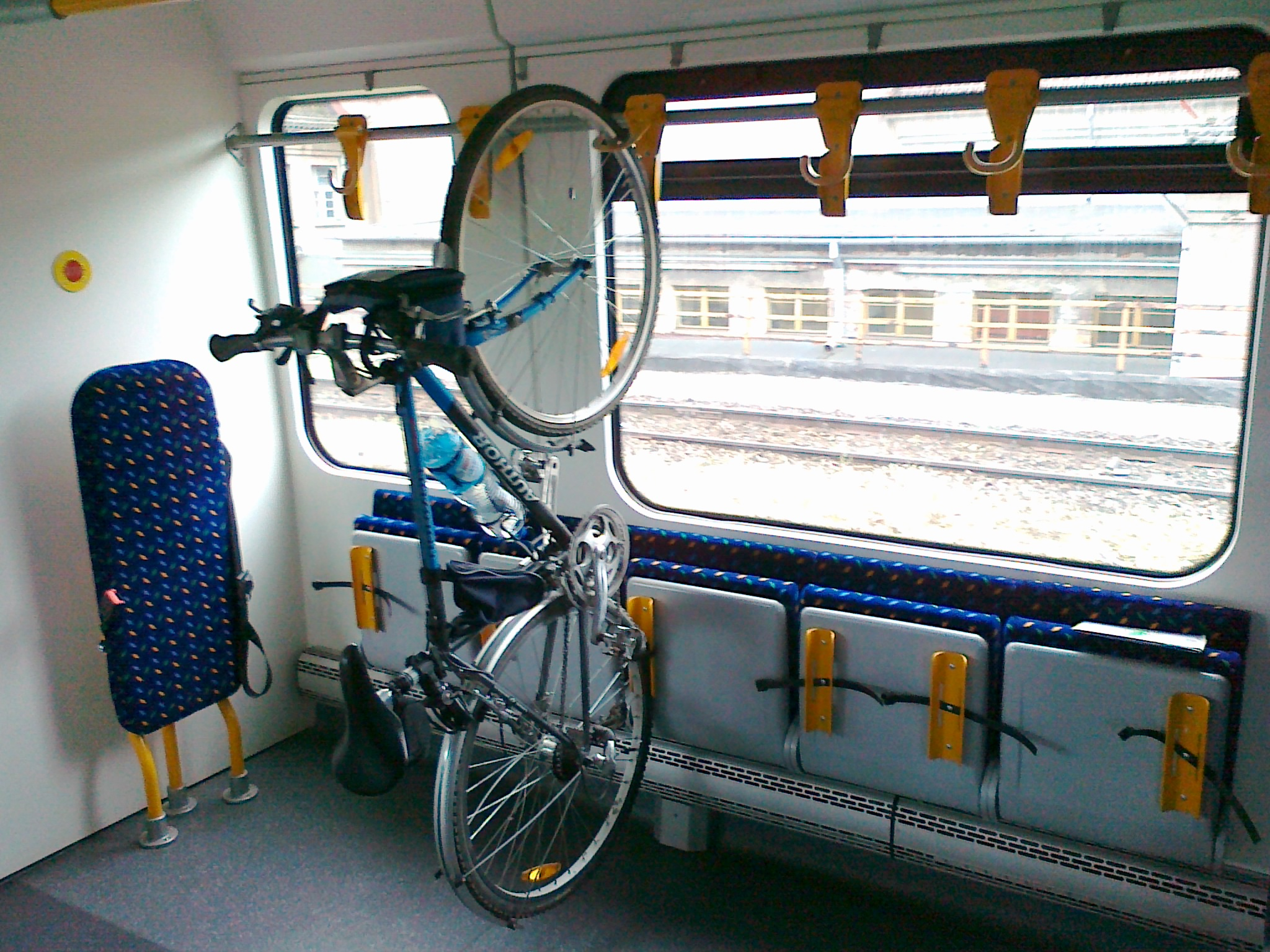
Storage compartment.

The 220M and 221M are two and three-section passenger trains, with an open saloon designed for regional passenger services on non-electrified railway lines.

=== Interior ===
Each of the units has one pair of sliding doors with a width of 1300 mm, which are located at a low floor height of 600 mm. In addition, at each door, there is a sliding step made for easy boarding from the lower station platforms. In the unit there is a storage zone with a high floor height of 1200 mm.

In one of the units near the door, there is a zone for disabled people, equipped with ramps for wheelchairs next to which there is also a toilet adapted for disabled people, equipped with a changing table for infants. The seats in the units are arranged in a group arrangement in the area of the high floors, and a line arrangement in the lower zone. The unit has 6 hangers for bicycles, electrical plugs, passenger information system, air conditioning and monitoring.

=== Chassis and drive ===
Both of the units have a two-axle drive 74RSNa type of a wheelbase of 2500 mm, and the two-axle units use the Jakobs 72RSTa system type with a wheelbase of 2900 mm. The chassis is held on gas springs (stage two of the suspension) and coil springs (first level of the suspension).

The drive of the unit uses two drive units in the power-pack system, consisting of a diesel engine with a capacity of 390 kW, power transmission, compressor, generator and the engine cooling system. The range of the unit is 1000 km.

There is a possibility to connect up to 3 units or 2 units and a carriage with multiple unit train control.

== Operators ==
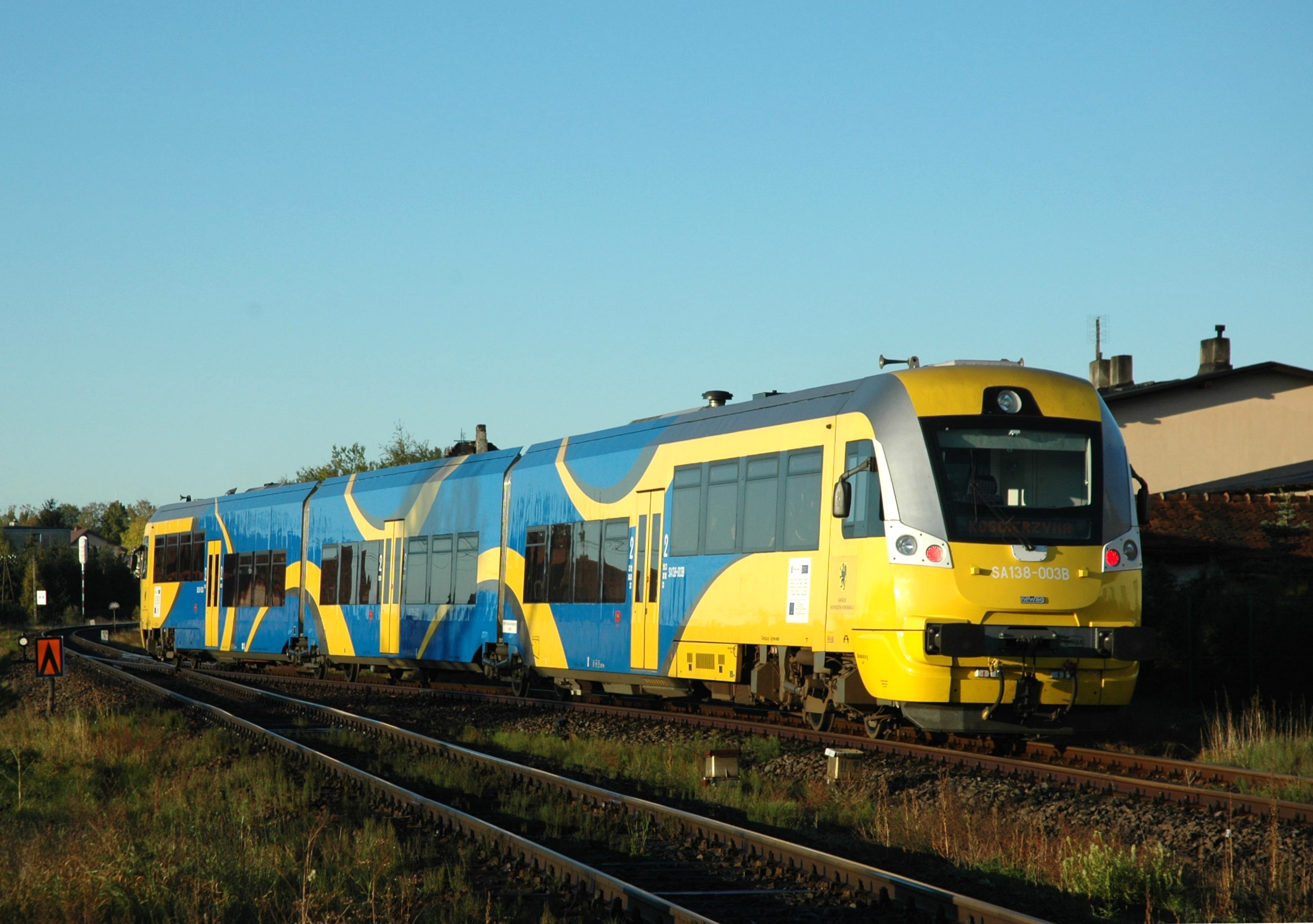
The SA138 at the station in Żukowo.

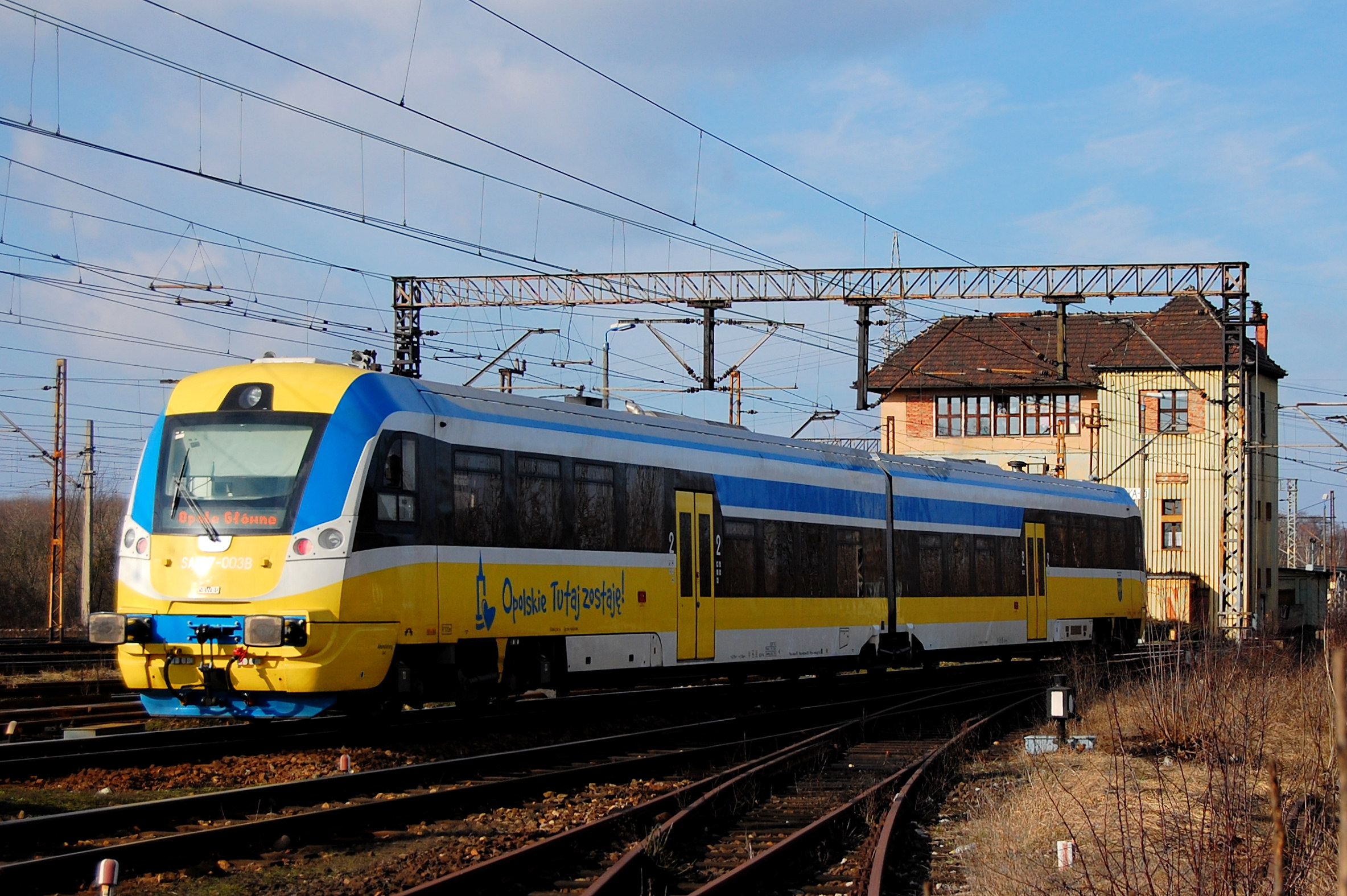
The SA137 at a station in Kędzierzyn Koźle.

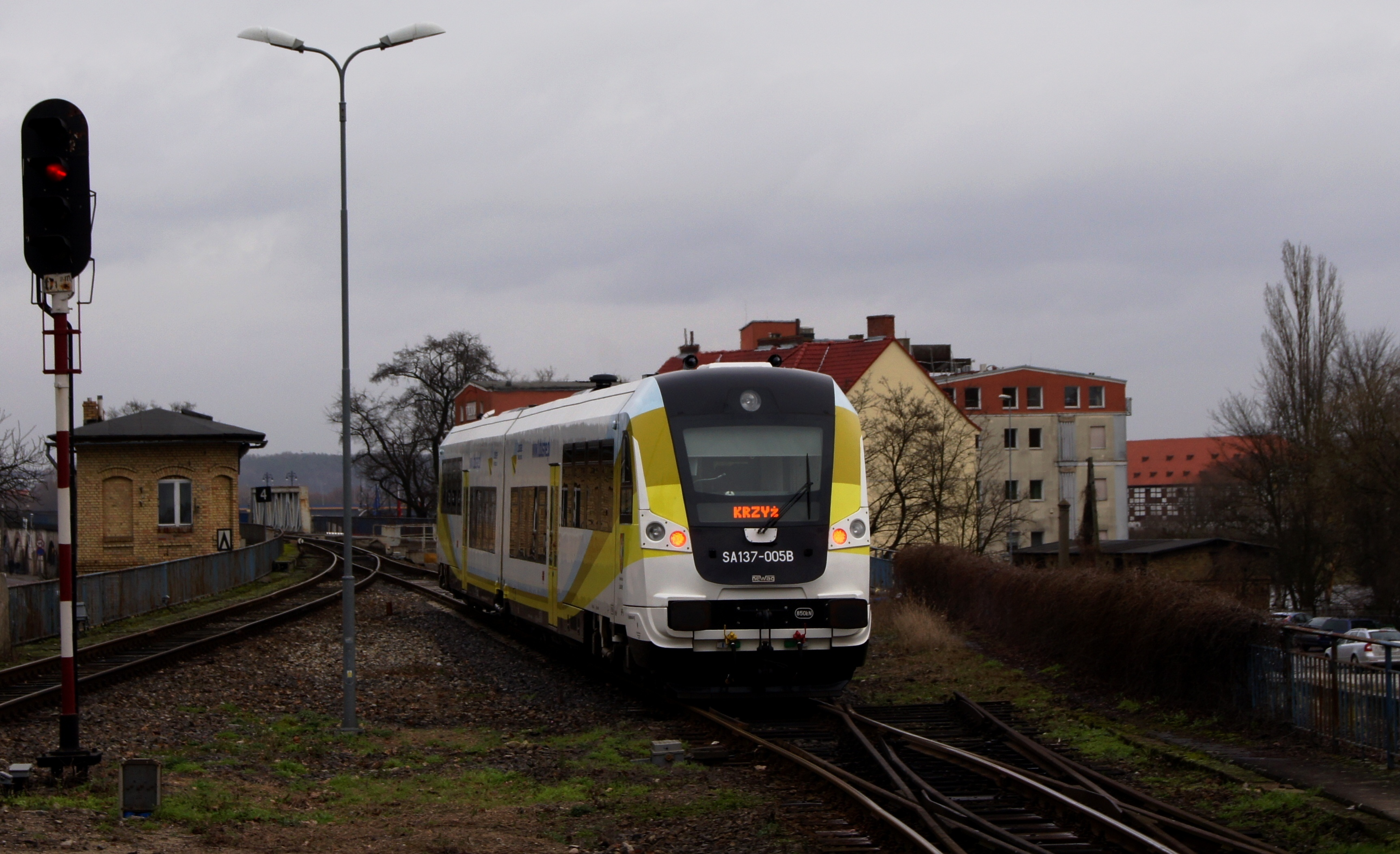
The SA137 at a station in Gorzów Wielkopolski.

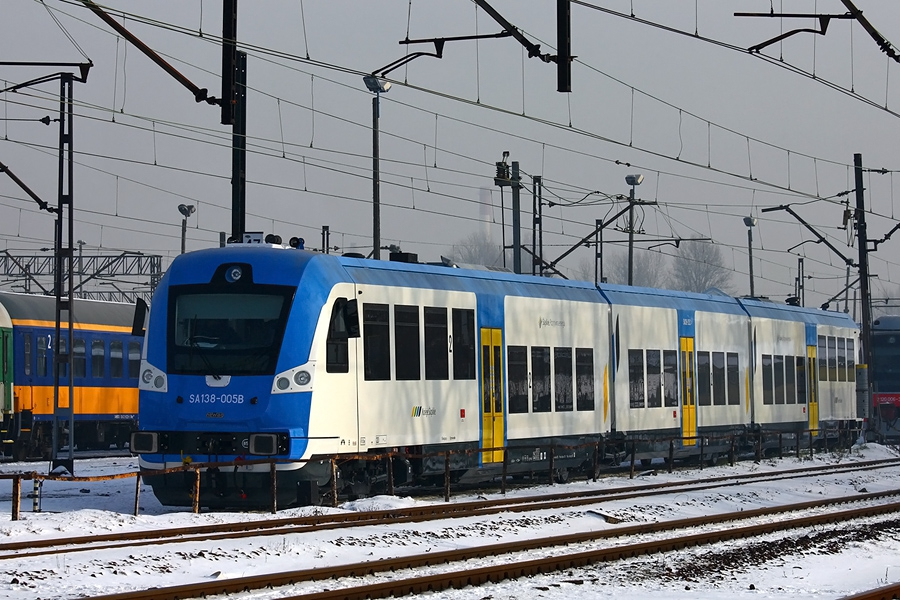
The SA138 at a station in Gliwice.

Owner	Type	Series	Numbers	Amount	Operator
Pomorskie; Voivodeship	220M	SA137	001-002	2	Polregio
Pomorskie; Voivodeship	221M	SA138	001-004	4	Polregio
Opole; Voivodeship	220M	SA137	003-004	2	Polregio
Lubusz; Voivodeship	220M	SA137	005	1	Polregio
Silesian; Voivodeship	221M	SA138	005	1	Silesian Railways
Polregio	220M	SA137	006-009	4	Polregio

=== Pomeranian Voivodeship ===
On 21 May 2010, an agreement was signed with the Pomeranian Voivodeship to provide two units of two-axle 220M and 4 units of the three-axle 221M. Both two-axle units were delivered on 11 November, and 2 units of the three-axle on 30 November. More of the 221M unit type was delivered on 23 December 2010 and 26 January 2011. The units operate routes between Chojnice, Kościerzyna, Gdynia and Hel.

The delivered units joined routes with the smaller powered units: one Kolzam 212M, two Pesa 214m and four Pesa 218m.

=== Opole Voivodeship ===
On 28 September 2010, an agreement was signed with the Opole Voivodeship to provide 2 units of the two-axle PCS 220M unit. On 27 December 2010 the first unit has been delivered (SA137-003), and on 10 May 2011 a second (SA137-004) has been delivered.

The delivered units work on the same route with smaller powered units: one Kolzam 212M, three Pesa 214m and five Pesa 218m.
