= Newag Impuls =

Family of trains

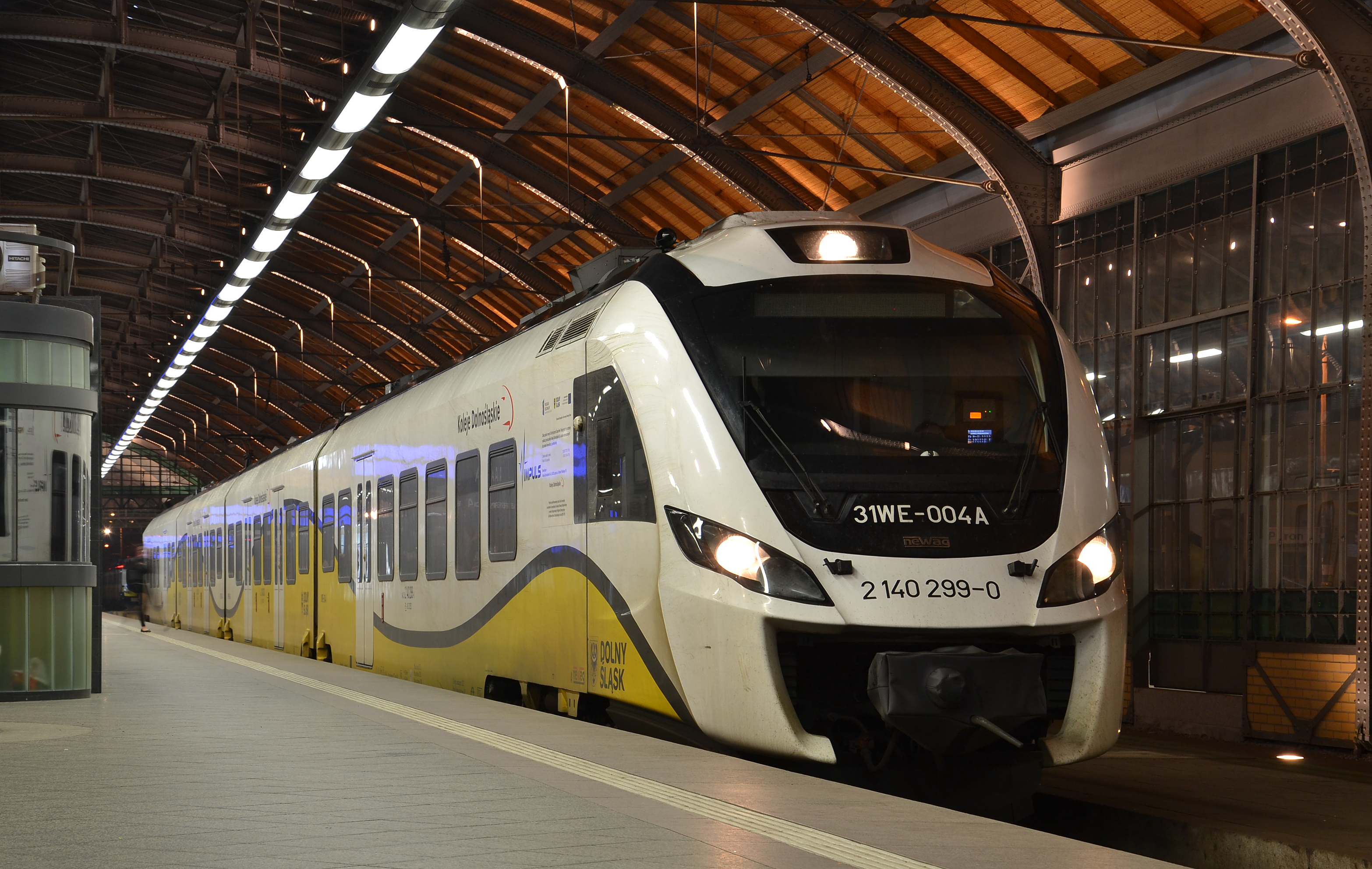
- Newag Impuls of Lower Silesian Railways at Wrocław Główny
- Stock type: Electric multiple unit
- In service: 2012–present
- Manufacturer: Newag
- Family name: Impuls
- Number built: 217 (additional 40 are on order)
- Capacity: 107–218 seats
- Operators: Lower Silesian Railways; Silesian Railways; Masovian Railways; Greater Poland Railways; Łódź Agglomeration Railway; Polregio; Tricity Rapid Urban Railway; Rapid Urban Railway (Warsaw); Ferrovie del Sud Est

Specifications
- Car length: 42.4–113.2 m (139 ft 1 in – 371 ft 5 in)
- Width: 2.84 m (9 ft 4 in)
- Height: 4.15 m (13 ft 7 in)
- Articulated sections: 2–6
- Maximum speed: 160 km/h (99 mph) for electrics and bi-mode version in electric mode; 120–130 km/h (75–81 mph) for diesel and bi-mode version in diesel mode
- Power output: 1600–3200 kW for electrics
- Electric system: 3 kV DC overhead line
- Current collection: pantograph
- Track gauge: 1,435 mm (4 ft 8 1/2 in) standard gauge

Newag Impuls is a family of standard-gauge electric, diesel and bi-mode (hybrid) multiple units manufactured by Polish railway rolling stock manufacturer Newag. Manufactured in several versions, they differ in the number of cars and purpose. The company offers several versions: electric 2-car (types 37WE and 37WEa), 3-car (types 36WE, 36WEa, 36WEb, 36WEd), 4-car (type 31WE), 5-car (type 45WE) and 6-car (type 35WE) trainsets, and also diesel and bi-mode 3-car (types 36WEhd and 36WEh, respectively) ones.

By the end of 2020, 190 Impulses were ordered.

== Description ==
The Impuls family of trains are low-floor multiple units equipped with a full interior monitoring system, air-conditioning, passenger information system and can have ticket dispensers if requested.

Their interior is suitable for the needs of passengers with reduced mobility. It features sloping floors, folded steps, broad aisles and a designated space for wheelchairs and bicycles. In the vehicle, motor bogies are used as well as Jacobs bogies (mounted between each two cars). The bogies have a modern gear system and two-stage spring suspension systems that effectively muffle vibrations, thus enhancing comfort while travelling.

The trains can be built in various configurations. The two-car variant is known as "37WE", three-car "36WE", four-car "31WE", five-car "45WE" and six-car "35WE". The trains can have interiors equipped for commuter and suburban service but also for use on long-distance routes.

The first design was launched in 2012. One of the trains, produced for Lower Silesian Railways, broke the Polish speed record of 211 km/h (131 mph) in 2013 on the test track, on 7 September 2015 a Newag Impuls 45WE unit for Masovian Railways once again topped this record with what is now the current one, 226 km/h (140 mph), which makes it the fastest passenger train produced in Poland.

Newag launched a second generation of the design, named Impuls II, in 2017 with an order of 14 trainsets from Łódź Agglomeration Railway.

The bi-mode version's top speed is 120 km/h in diesel mode and 160 km/h in electric mode.

== 2023 reveal of sabotage ==
In December 2023, it was revealed that Newag Impuls software had code that purposefully caused breakdowns of trains that were serviced by non-Newag workshops, were inactive for 10 days or met other arbitrary conditions, which has been likened to Dieselgate software manipulation. This was discovered by reverse engineers hired by Lower Silesian Railways and confirmed by former Polish minister of digital affairs Janusz Cieszyński.

== Usage ==
Country	Owner	Operator	Type	No. of cars	Image	Number	Year
Poland	Lower Silesian Railways		31WE	4		10	2013, 2015
Poland	Lower Silesian Railways		36WEa	3		6	2014–2015
Poland	Lower Silesian Railways		45WE	5		11	2017
Poland	Lower Silesian Railways		36WEh	3		2 out of 6	2021–2022
Poland	Masovian Railways		45WE	5		12	2015
Poland	Greater Poland Railways		36WEhd	3		4 out of 6	2020–2021, 2023
Poland	Łódź Agglomeration Railway		36WEd	3		14	2018–2019
Poland	Łódź Agglomeration Railway		36WEh	3		0 out of 3	from 2023
Poland	Polregio		31WE	4		3	2017
Poland	PKP Szybka Kolej Miejska w Trójmieście		31WE	4		2	2016
Poland	SKM Warszawa		35WE	6		9	2012–2013
Poland	SKM Warszawa		31WEba	4		6	2022
Poland	SKM Warszawa		45WEa	5		15	2022
Poland	Lesser Poland Voivodeship	Polregio	36WEa	3		6	2014–2015
Poland	Lesser Poland Voivodeship	Polregio	31WEb	4		5	2021
Poland	Lesser Poland Voivodeship	Lesser Poland Railways	31WE	4		8	2016–2017
Poland	Lesser Poland Voivodeship	Lesser Poland Railways	45WE	5		5	2016–2017
Poland	Lesser Poland Voivodeship	Lesser Poland Railways	31WEb	4		4	2021
Poland	Lublin Voivodeship	Polregio	37WEa	2		8 out of 9	from 2021
Poland	Lubusz Voivodeship	Polregio	31WE	4		3	2014–2015
Poland	Lubusz Voivodeship	Polregio	36WEhd	3		2	2020
Poland	Opole Voivodeship	Polregio	36WEa	3		7	2016–2018
Poland	PKP Intercity		ESD162	6		0 out of 35	2027
Poland	Pomeranian Voivodeship	Polregio	45WE	5		10	2018–2020
Poland	Silesian Voivodeship	Silesian Railways	35WE	6		1	2012
Poland	Silesian Voivodeship	Silesian Railways	36WEa	3		3	2014
Poland	Silesian Voivodeship	Polregio	36WEa	3		3	2015
Poland	Subcarpathian Voivodeship	Polregio	36WE	3		1	2013
Poland	Subcarpathian Voivodeship	Polregio	37WE	2		2	2014
Poland	Subcarpathian Voivodeship	Polregio	36WEa	3		1	2015
Poland	Subcarpathian Voivodeship	Polregio	36WEdb	3		8	2020
Poland	Świętokrzyskie Voivodeship	Polregio	36WEa	3		6	2014–2015
Poland	Świętokrzyskie Voivodeship	Polregio	31WE	4		2	2018
Poland	Warmian-Masurian Voivodeship	Polregio	37WE	2		1	2015
Poland	West Pomeranian Voivodeship	Polregio	31WE	4		22	2013-2015, 2017–2018
Poland	West Pomeranian Voivodeship	Polregio	36WEa	3		18	2017–2018
Poland	West Pomeranian Voivodeship	Polregio	36WEh	3		7 out of 12	from 2020
Italy	Ferrovie del Sud Est		36WEb	3		11 out of 15	from 2019

== See also ==
- Newag
- Pesa Elf
- Stadler FLIRT
