= Warszawa Zoo railway station =

Railway station in Warsaw, Poland

Warszawa Zoo
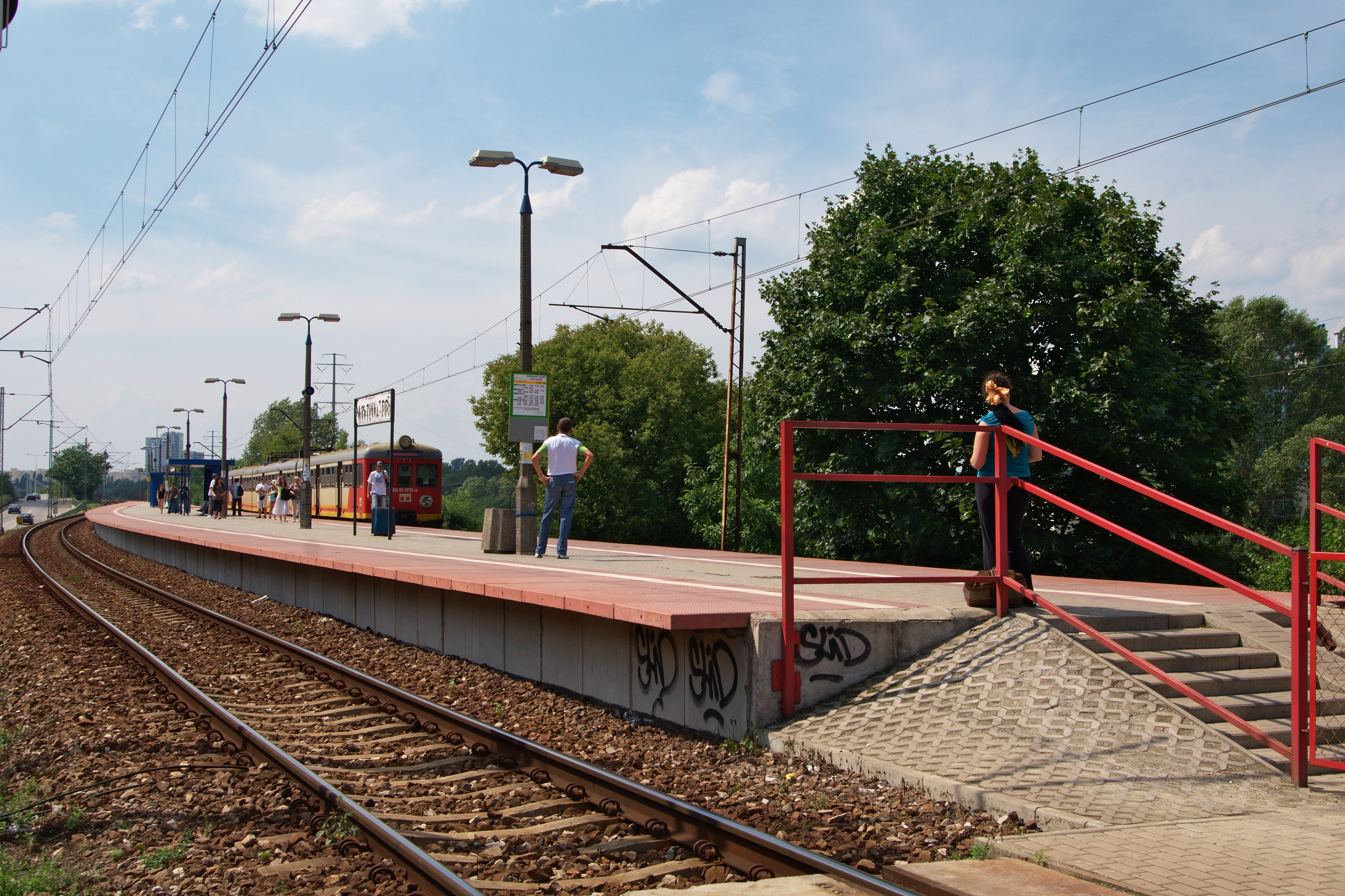

General information
- Location: Praga Północ, Warsaw, Masovian; Poland
- Coordinates: 52°15′49″N 21°01′04″E
- Owner: Polskie Koleje Państwowe S.A.
- Platforms: 1
- Tracks: 2

Construction
- Structure type: Building: No

Services
Preceding station	Masovian Railways	Following station
Warszawa Gdańska towards Warszawa Zachodnia	R90	Warszawa Praga towards Działdowo
Warszawa Gdańska towards Warszawa Zachodnia	RE90	Warszawa Toruńska towards Działdowo
Preceding station	SKM Warsaw	Following station
Warszawa Gdańska towards Warsaw Chopin Airport	S3	Warszawa Praga towards Legionowo Piaski or Radzymin
Warszawa Gdańska towards Piaseczno	S4	Warszawa Praga towards Zegrze Południowe
Location
- Warszawa Zoo located on the Warsaw Railway Junction

Warszawa Zoo railway station is a railway station in the Praga Północ district of Warsaw, Poland. It was built on the Warsaw orbital line, which goes through Warszawa Gdańska station. As of 2011, it is used by Masovian Railways, who run the KM9 services from Warszawa Wola through the north of the Masovian Voivodeship to Działdowo, in the Warmian-Masurian Voivodeship via Legionowo, Nasielsk, Modlin, Ciechanów and Mława, at all of which some trains terminate, and by Rapid Urban Railway (Warsaw), who run services to Wieliszew, with some trains terminating at Legionowo or Legionowo Piaski. The station is located near to Warsaw Zoo.

Warszawa Zoo before renovation

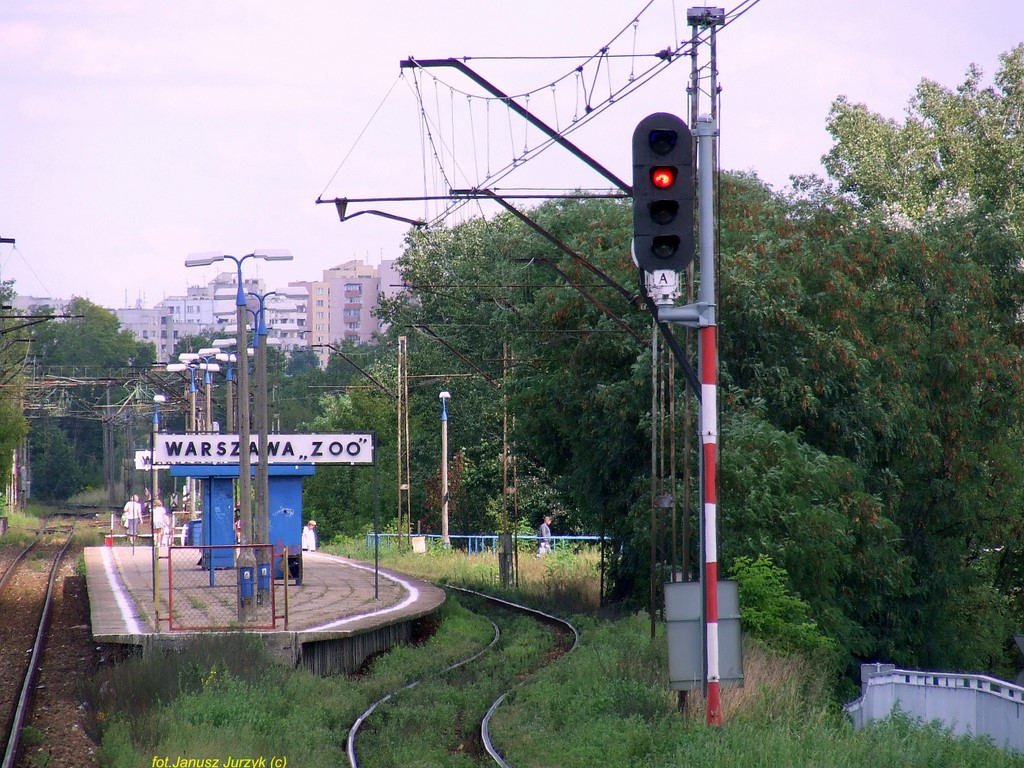

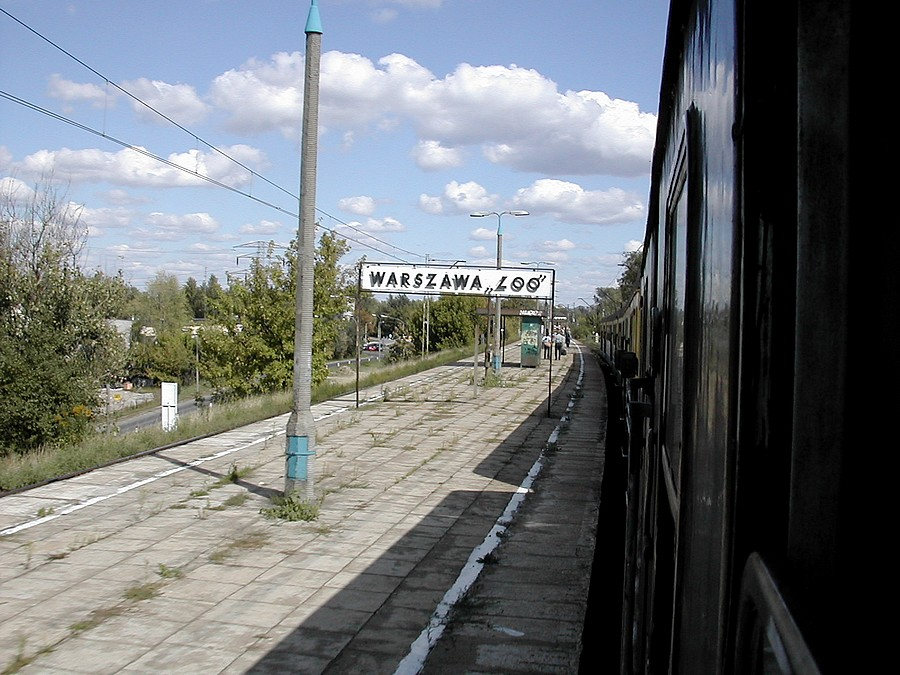
