= Newag 14WE =

Class of Polish electric multiple unit

14WE
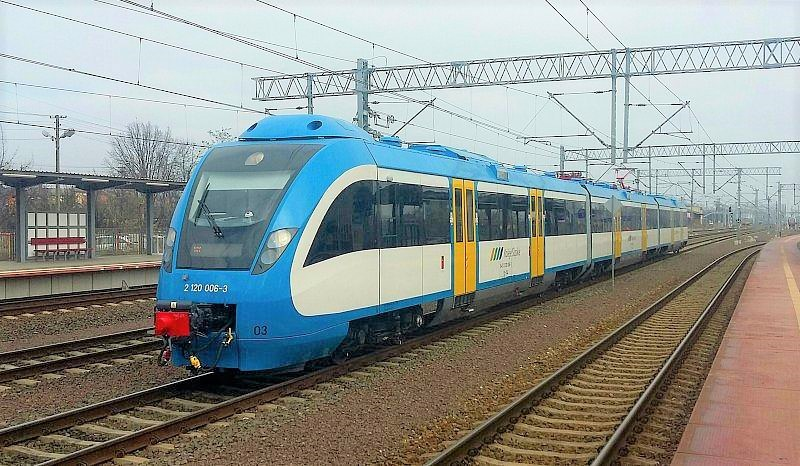
- 14WE of Silesian Railways

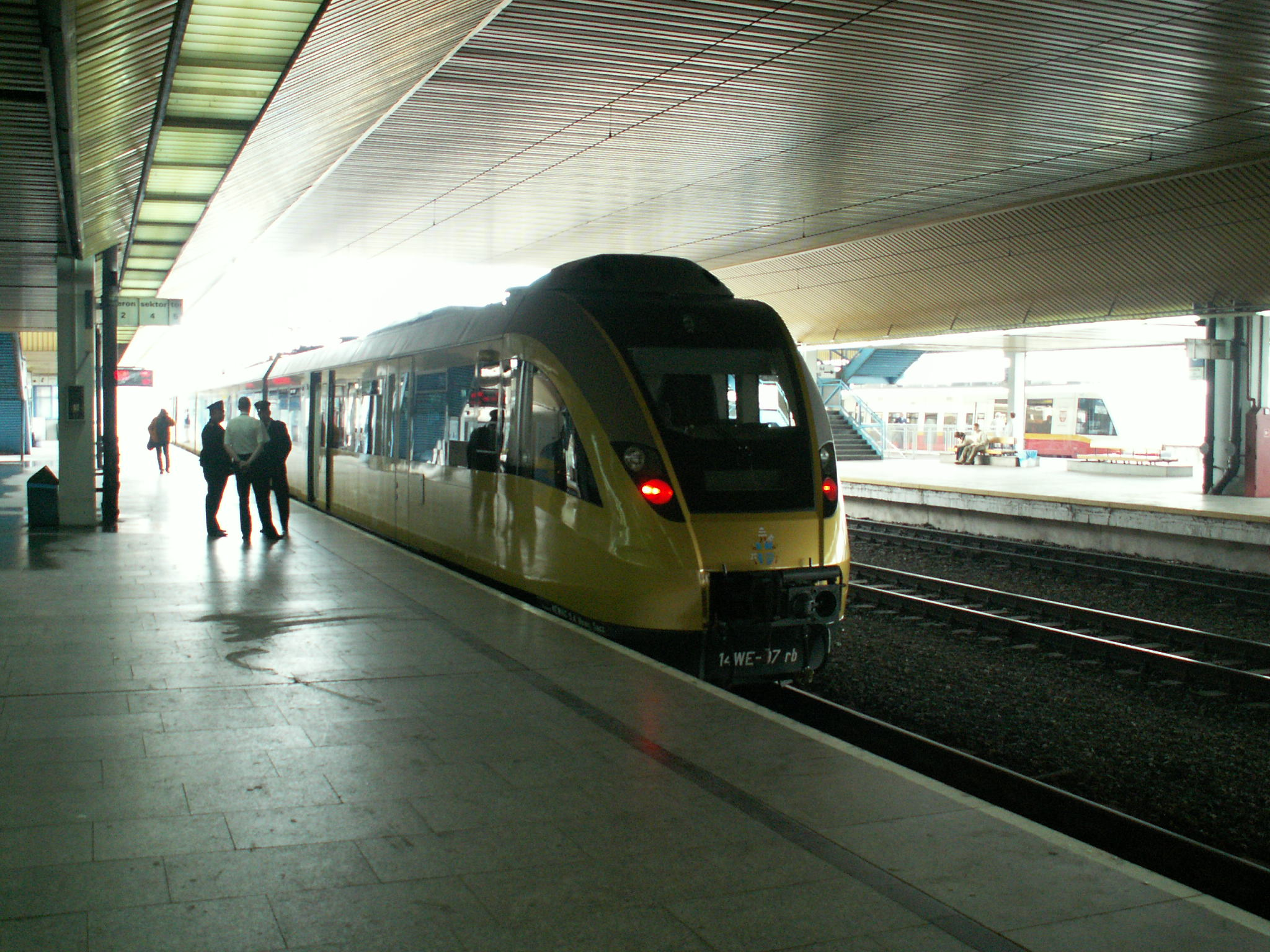
- EN61 operated by Polregio at Kraków Główny
- In service: 2005–present
- Manufacturers: Newag, Poland
- Constructed: 2005–2007
- Number built: 9 sets (as of Nov. 2007)
- Formation: Three-car sets
- Operators: SKM Warsaw, Polregio, Lesser Poland Railways, Silesian Railways

Specifications
- Train length: 60 m (196 ft 10 in)
- Maximum speed: 110 km/h (68 mph)
- Weight: 132.6 t (130.5 long tons; 146.2 short tons)
- Traction system: LKf 450 (4 per trainset)
- Power output: 580 kW (780 hp)/740 kW (990 hp) (cont./hourly)
- Electric system: 3 kV DC
- Current collection: Overhead lines / Pantograph
- UIC classification: 2′2′+Bo′Bo′+2′2′
- Braking system: SAB-Wabco
- Track gauge: 1,435 mm (4 ft 8 1/2 in)

14WE (original project names EN57/M and Halny; one unit also called EN61 mainly used for "papal train" excursion services) is an electric multiple unit (EMU) produced by Newag in Nowy Sącz, Poland. They are essentially heavily reconstructed PKP class EN57 EMU, of early-1960s vintage, reusing only their underframes.

The trainset consists of driver car (type 410B), motor car (type 309B) and driver car (410B), with four passenger doors per car (two on each side). The 14WE is designed for suburban commuter traffic, with the carrying capacity of 192 seats and (nominally) 255 standing places. It is air conditioned and can be used with platforms 760 to 1,060 mm (30 to 42 in) high.

The trainset has Scharfenberg couplers, which are standard on all Polish EMUs. They are placed at the height of 1,040 mm (41 in), according to an UIC recommendation, whereas the Polish practice is 950 mm (37 in). This creates operational problems in cases of a breakdown.
