= Newag 6Dg =

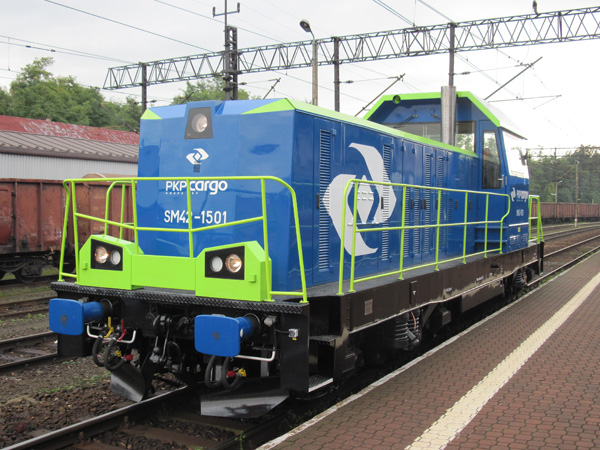
Type and origin
- Builder: Newag
- Build date: 2007–present
- Total produced: 164
Specifications
- Configuration
  - UIC: Bo'Bo'
- Gauge: 1,435 mm (standard-gauge)
- Wheel diameter: 1100 mm
- Minimum curve: 50 or 80 m
- Length
  - Over couplers: 14,240 mm
- Width: 3150 mm
- Height: 4323 mm
- Axle load: 17.5 t
- Loco weight: 70 t (69 long tons; 77 short tons)
- Fuel capacity: 2350 or 2815 l
- Fuel consumption: 198 g/kWh
- RPM
  - Maximum RPM: 1800 min⁻¹
- Engine type: Caterpillar C27
- Generator: EMIT Ghp 400 M4C
- Traction motors: Lsa-430
Performance figures
- Maximum speed: 90 km/h (56 mph)
- Power output: 652 or 708 kW (874 or 949 hp)
- Tractive effort
  - Starting: 219 kN
  - 1 hour: 130 kN
  - Continuous: 112 kN

Newag 6Dg is a diesel powered shunter locomotive, modernised by Newag from the locomotive SM42 series by Fablok. The locomotive has a Caterpillar C27 diesel engine, which reduces emissions in accordance with the standards required since 2009. It is equipped with a microprocessor control system and remote control. Compared to the SM42 series, the locomotive appears completely different.

== History ==
The 6D locomotive was meant not only as a shunter but also for running passenger trains and light freight. The old SM42 design however, dates back to the 1960s and has notable drawbacks due to poor visibility from driver's cab and the V engine which caused noise and vibrations. Over the 30-year production period the locomotive did not have any significant upgrades. The advantage was the excellent traction which was achieved by a8C22 engine at low RPM. There were attempts to modernise the structure in the 1990s, but these did not go beyond the prototype stage (SM42-2000). Only in 2007 Newag Nowy Sącz had prepared a draft for a total modernisation of the SM42 class. This included a high RPM, turbocharged diesel engine coupled with an AC generator in place with a dynamo.

In the railway world the locomotive is called Kiosk due to its streamline and box type structure.

== Operators ==
Country	Proprietor	Amount	Total amount in each country
Poland	Huta Częstochowa	3	149 from 164
Poland	Kolprem	1	149 from 164
Poland	Koltar	3	149 from 164
Poland	Lotos Kolej	3	149 from 164
Poland	Newag	3	149 from 164
Poland	PGE	0 from 3	149 from 164
Poland	PKP Cargo	121	149 from 164
Poland	PNUIK Kraków	2	149 from 164
Poland	Pol-Miedź	13 from 19	149 from 164
Poland	Polzug	0 from 6	149 from 164
