= Newag =

Polish railway manufacturer

Newag S.A.
- Type: Public (Spółka Akcyjna)
- Traded as: WSE: NWG
- Industry: Railway rolling stock manufacturer
- Founded: 1876
- Headquarters: Nowy Sącz, Poland
- Key people: Zbigniew Konieczek (President and CEO); Zbigniew Jakubas (Chairman of the supervisory board)
- Products: locomotives; multiple units; trams
- Revenue: 1,325,866,000 zł (2020)
- Net income: 169,139,000 zł (2020)
- Number of employees: 1,447 (2020)
- Website: www.newag.pl

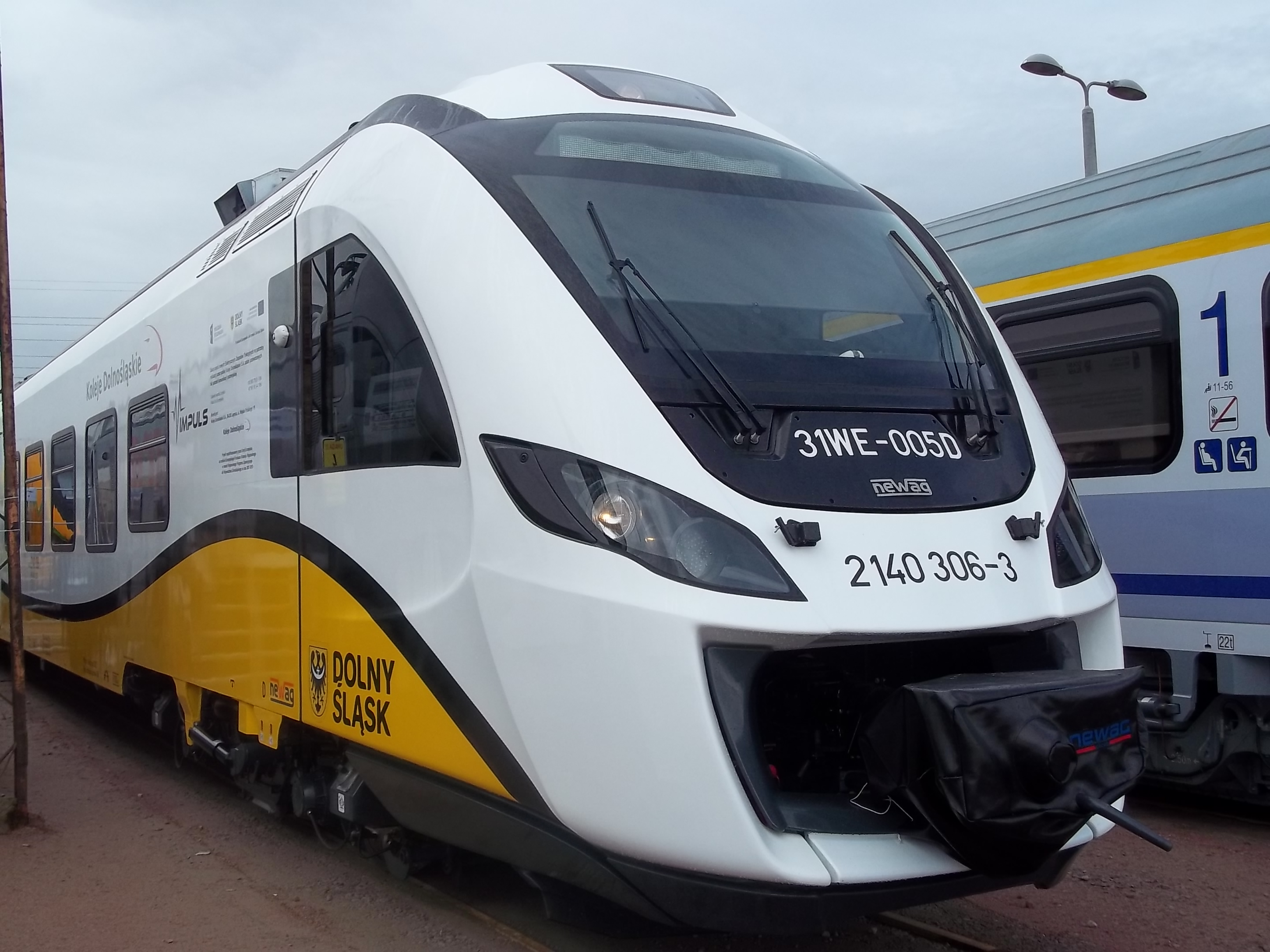
Multiple unit ED78 of Lower Silesian Railways

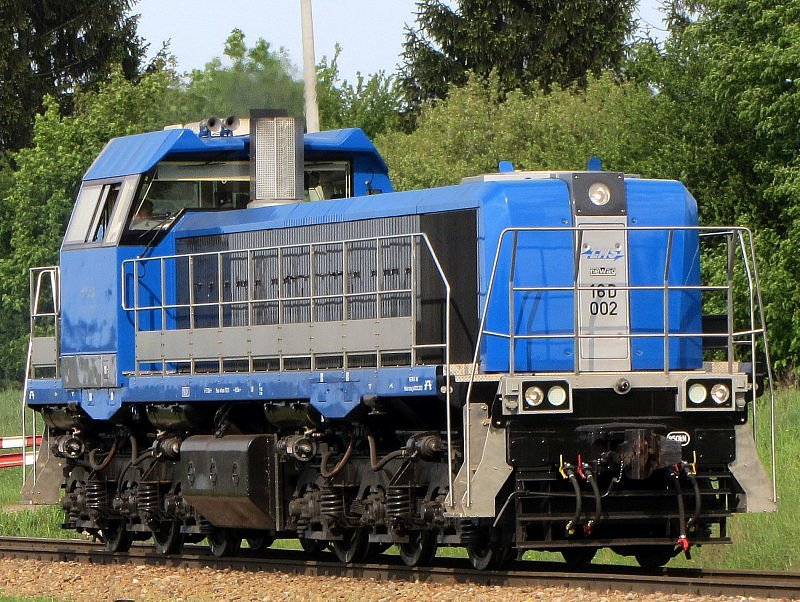
Diesel Locomotive 16D

Newag S.A. (pronounced "nevag") is a Polish company, based in Nowy Sącz, specialising in the production, maintenance, and modernisation of railway rolling stock. The company's products include the 14WE, 19WE, 35WE types electric multiple units. The company has also developed the Nevelo prototype tram and formed a consortium with Siemens Mobility for final assembly of Siemens Inspiro metro trains for the Warsaw Metro and Sofia Metro.

== History ==
In 1876 (when Nowy Sącz was partitioned by Austria-Hungary), the Imperial–Royal Railway Workshops opened, serving the newly built Tarnów–Leluchów railway line. After the First World War and the establishment of the Second Polish Republic, the company, renamed "1st Class Main Workshop", was redirected to serve Polish State Railways (PKP), employing some 1,800 workers in 1922.

In post-World War II communist Poland the workshop was nationalised and later became a separate, though still state-owned, enterprise officially called "Nowy Sacz Railway Rolling Stock Repairs Depot in Nowy Sacz, State Independent Enterprise" (Polish: Zakłady Naprawcze Taboru Kolejowego "Nowy Sącz" w Nowym Sączu, Przedsiębiorstwo Państwowe Wyodrębnione; ZNTK Nowy Sącz), with a workforce of about 3,500 in 1952. ZNTK Nowy Sącz serviced its last steam locomotive (a TKt48) in 1972.

After the fall of communism and the economic changes of 1989, ZNTK Nowy Sącz was transformed into a State Treasury Joint Stock Company, with the Polish state as the only shareholder. The company went through a period of financial turmoil around 2001 and its shares were acquired by a private domestic investor in 2003. The current name was adopted in 2005. In 2008, Newag acquired ZNTK Gilwice and subsequently integrated the latter's operations into the wider company.

In 2012, the first electric multiple unit from the 35WE series belonging to the Newag Impuls family of trains was produced. In 2013, the 31WE Impuls train achieved the speed of 211.6 kph on the Central Rail Line (CMK) setting a new record for a train designed and manufactured entirely in Poland.

In December 2013, the company made its debut on the Warsaw Stock Exchange with 43.47% of the company's shares having been sold.

In May 2024, the company secured a PLN 2.7 billion (EUR 740 million) contract with PKP Intercity, which aims to diversify its rolling stock, for the delivery of 35 hybrid dual-mode multiple units.

== Test track ==
The company has set up an electrified, 245 metre long test track to test the electric rolling stock it manufactures or modernises. The overhead can be supplied with any of the four systems, commonly used on European railways: 1.5 and 3 kV DC, 15 kV 16.7 Hz and 25 kV 50 Hz.

== 2023 revelation of software sabotage ==
At the OhMyH@ck conference held in Warsaw on 5 December 2023, software engineers from white hat hacker group Dragon Sector revealed that they had reverse engineered the embedded software of Newag 45WE Impuls EMUs after operator Lower Silesian Railways had experienced a number of mysterious breakdowns when maintenance was performed by their selected contractor Serwis Pojazdów Szynowych (SPS). In Newag's response, the issues were a result of malpractice by SPS and the trains should have instead been serviced by Newag.

Analysis of the software revealed that the train's embedded computers were programmed to lock up and display bogus fault messages and prevent the train from running if a GPS tracker detected that it spent a certain number of days in an independent repair company’s maintenance center, and also if certain replacement parts had a serial number not approved by the manufacturer.

In an investigation it was also discovered that the software locks could be bypassed by pressing a sequence of buttons in the cab of the train, although a later software update removed this ability. The Dragon Sector group analysed 29 trains belonging to Lower Silesian Railways as well as other affected operators such as Masovian Railways, SKM Warszawa, WKD and Polregio, 24 of which had software locks which were unlocked by the group. After those findings were made public, former Minister of Digital Affairs Janusz Cieszyński confirmed the Polish government and Polish intelligence agencies had known about the findings since May. It was also revealed that the Polish Internal Security Agency (ABW) had, in October 2022, submitted a case against Newag regarding the abovementioned software manipulation incidents to the prosecutor's office in Nowy Sącz, which initially downplayed the incident until said findings publicly came to light, after which, the investigation was taken over by the regional prosecutor's office in Kraków on suspicion of crimes committed under Article 269 §1 and Article 286 §1 of the Polish Penal Code.

Newag strongly denied the claims they intentionally disabled their software and instead alleged SPS was propagating a conspiracy theory to avoid contractual penalties for being unable to service the trains. Newag also claimed there is no proof they are the author of the software or that the modifications had been introduced by them. Newag stated it would take legal action against SPS and the Dragon Sector group for slander and defamation.

The Dragon Sector hacker group subsequently gave a presentation at the 37th Chaos Communication Congress (37C3) in Hamburg on 27 December 2023, where they explained in detail the process of debugging the train software and their findings.

The Sejm's Parliamentary Committee for Combating Transport Exclusion subsequently convened three hearings regarding the abovementioned allegations on 17 January, 27 February and 26 March 2024, whose participants included representatives of the Dragon Sector team, Newag, railway operators and members of the Sejm.

Newag has since filed a lawsuit for copyright infringement against Dragon Sector and SPS. The first hearing was held by the District Court in Warsaw on 28 August 2024.

== Current products ==
- Nevelo – three-section low-floor tramcar, currently in service in Kraków
- Impuls – electric multiple unit for urban, suburban or regional services
- Vulcano – diesel multiple unit, currently in service in Italy
- Griffin – four-axle electric or diesel-electric locomotive for express passenger and light-medium freight services
- Dragon – six-axle high-power electric or diesel-electric locomotive for heavy freight services

Locomotives and EMU are available with optional last-mile diesel.

=== Production history ===
Own production
Electric multiple units
14WE; Halny	19WE	31WE; Impuls	35WE; Impuls	36WE; Impuls	37WE; Impuls	39WE	45WE; Impuls	Inspiro	
Diesel multiple units
36WEhd	220M	221M	222M	226M; Vulcano					
Electric locomotives
E4MSU; Griffin	E4DCU-DP; Griffin	E6ACT; Dragon	E6DCF-DP; Dragon						
Trams
126N; Nevelo									
Modernization
Electric multiple units
EN57	EN71								
Electric locomotives
EU07; 303Eb	EU07; 303Ec	EP07P; 303Eb	EP09; 104Ec	EM10; 405Em	3E-100	ET22; 201El	ET22; 201Ek	ET22; 201Em	EL2
Diesel locomotives
6Dg	6Dl	15D/16D	18D	311D					

== See also ==
- Economy of Poland
- List of companies of Poland
- Pesa SA
