= Bert Reid =

Bert Reid may refer to:

- Bert Reid (rugby union), see List of South Africa national rugby union players
- Bert Reid (musician), member of Raw Silk and Crown Heights Affair

== See also ==
- Bert Read (fl. 1895–1908), English footballer
- Bertie Reed (1943–2006), South African solo yachtsman
- Bert Reed (born 1988), American football player
- Bert Fraser-Reid (born 1934), Jamaican organic chemist
- Albert Reid (disambiguation)
- Albert Read (disambiguation)
- Albert Reed (disambiguation)
- Robert Reid (disambiguation)
- Robert Reed (disambiguation)
- Herbert Reed (disambiguation)
- Hubert Reed (disambiguation)
