= Robert Reid =

Robert or Bob Reid may refer to:

== Art and architecture ==
- Robert Reid (architect) (1774–1856), Scottish architect
- Robert Payton Reid (1859–1945), Scottish academic painter
- Robert Reid (American painter) (1862–1929), American impressionist painter
- Robert Russell Reid (1927–2022), Canadian typographer and designer

== Business ==
- Robert Reid (antiquarian) (1773–1865), Scottish businessman and topographer
- Sir Robert Gillespie Reid (1842–1908), Scottish railway contractor
- Sir Robert Reid (railway executive, born 1921) (1921–1993), chairman of British Rail
- Sir Bob Reid (businessman) (1934–2025), chairman of the British Railways Board
- Robert Reid (author) (born 1966), American author

== Engineering and science ==
- Robert Carstairs Reid (1845–1894), Scottish civil engineer
- Robert Reid (chemical engineer) (1924–2006), American chemical engineer in thermodynamics

== Politics and government ==
- Robert R. Reid (1789–1841), U.S. representative, territorial governor of Florida
- Robert Dyce Reid (1829–1900), Australian pastoralist and member of the Victorian Legislative Council
- Robert Reid (Kirkcaldy Burghs MP) (1831–1875), British member of parliament for Kirkcaldy Burghs, 1874–1875
- Robert Reid (New Zealand politician) (1839–1897)
- Robert Reid (Australian politician, born 1842) (1842–1904), merchant and member of the Victorian Legislative Council and Australian Senate
- Robert Reid, 1st Earl Loreburn (1846–1923), British Liberal politician, Lord Chancellor
- Sir Robert Reid (civil servant) (1883–1964), British colonial administrator in India

== Sports ==
- Bob Reid (footballer, born 1887) (1887–1998), Scottish footballer who played for Burnley, Huddersfield Town, and Southend United
- Robert Reid (Scottish footballer) (fl. 1913–1918)
- Robert Reid (cross-country skier) (1898–1990), American Olympic skier
- Bob Reid (Australian footballer) (1924–2005), Australian rules footballer
- Robert Reid (ice hockey) (born 1932), Australian ice hockey player
- Robert Reid (basketball) (1955–2024), American basketball player
- Robert Reid (co-driver) (born 1966), Scottish world champion rally co-driver

== Others ==
- Robert Reid (bishop) (died 1558), Scottish abbot and bishop, founder of the University of Edinburgh
- Robert Reid (pipemaker) (1784–1837), Northumbrian smallpipes creator
- Robert Reid (soldier) (1842–1929), American Civil War soldier and Medal of Honor recipient
- Robert Reid (judge) (1855–1923), justice of the Louisiana Supreme Court
- Robert Lovell Reid (1921–1996), Australian agriculturalist
- James Reid (actor) (Robert James Reid, born 1993), Australian-born Filipino actor and musician

== See also ==
- Robert Read (1814–1896), Canadian businessman and politician
- Robert Read (cricketer) (1870–1945), New Zealand cricketer
- Bob Reade (1932–2020), American football player and coach
- Sir Robert Rede (died 1519), English judge
- Robert Reed (disambiguation)
- Bert Reid (disambiguation)
- Bobby Reid (disambiguation)
- Robert Reid-Pharr, American literary and cultural critic
