= Chotomów railway station =

Railway station in Chotomów, Poland

Chotomów
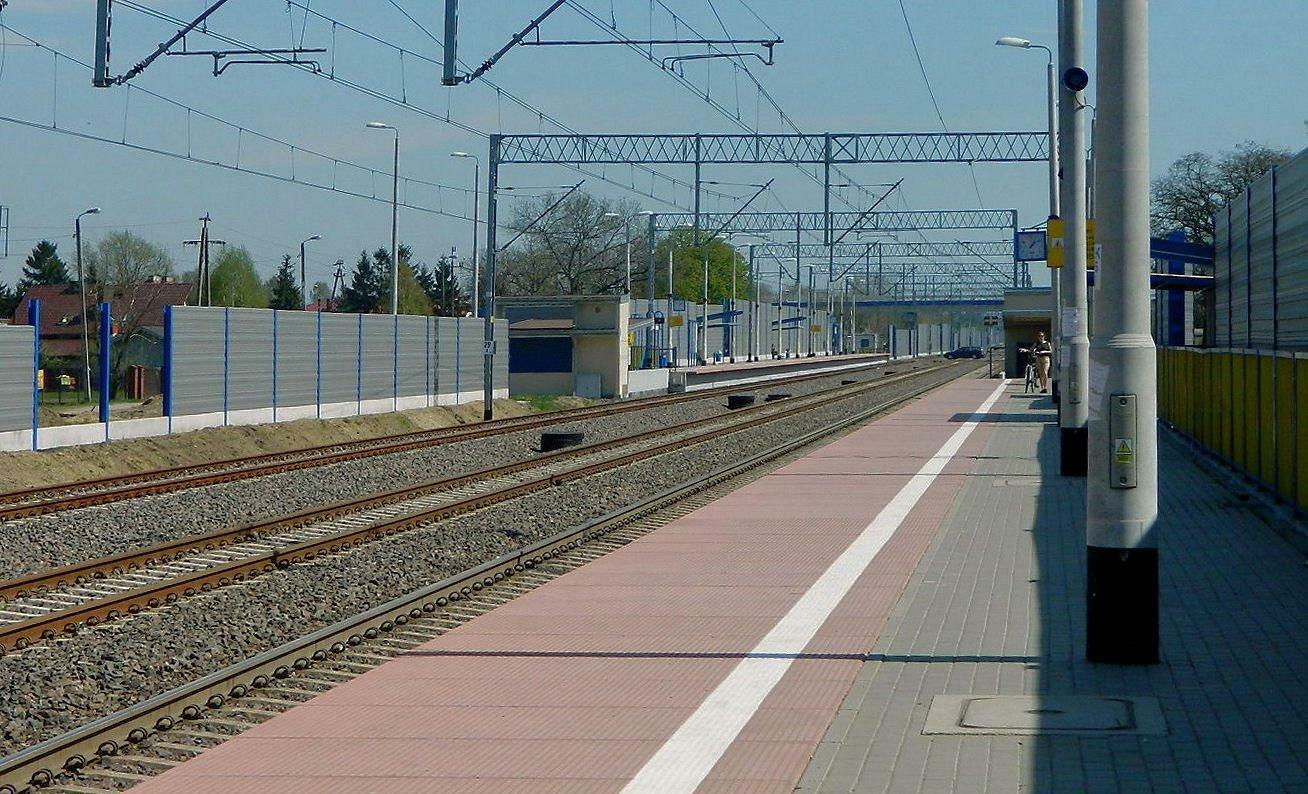

General information
- Location: Chotomów, Jabłonna, Legionowo, Masovian; Poland
- Coordinates: 52°24′57″N 20°53′05″E
- System: Railway Station
- Owner: Polskie Koleje Państwowe S.A.

Services
Preceding station	Masovian Railways	Following station
Legionowo Przystanek towards Warszawa Zachodnia	R9	Janówek towards Działdowo
Legionowo Przystanek towards Warszawa Zachodnia	R90	Janówek towards Działdowo
Legionowo Przystanek towards Warszawa Gdańska	RE91	Nowy Dwór Mazowiecki towards Sierpc
Legionowo Przystanek towards Warsaw Chopin Airport	RL	Nowy Dwór Mazowiecki towards Modlin
Location

Chotomów railway station is a railway station in Chotomów, Masovian, Poland. It is served by Masovian Railways.
