= Herbert Reed =

Herbert Reed may refer to:

- Farrant Reed (Herbert Farrant Reed, 1865–1911), English cricketer
- Sir Herbert Stanley Reed (1872–1969), British politician and journalist in India
- H. Owen Reed (Herbert Owen Reed, 1910–2014), American composer, conductor and author
- Herbert Reed (British Army soldier) (1911–1940), British recipient of the George Cross

== See also ==
- Herbert Read (disambiguation)
- Herbert Taylor Reade (1828–1897), Canadian recipient of the Victoria Cross
- Bert Reed (born 1988), American football wide receiver
- Bert Reid (disambiguation)
