= Bobby Reid =

Bobby Reid may refer to:

- Bobby Reid (footballer, born 1911) (1911–1987), Scottish international winger
- Bobby Reid (footballer, born 1936) (1936–2000), Scottish professional goalkeeper
- Bobby Reid (footballer, born 1955), Scottish professional defender
- Bobby Reid (American football) (born 1985), American football quarterback
- Bobby De Cordova-Reid (born 1993), English professional footballer, previously known as Bobby Reid

== See also ==
- Robert Reid (disambiguation)
- Robert Reed (disambiguation)
