= Gołotczyzna railway station =

Railway station in Gołotczyzna, Poland

Gołotczyzna
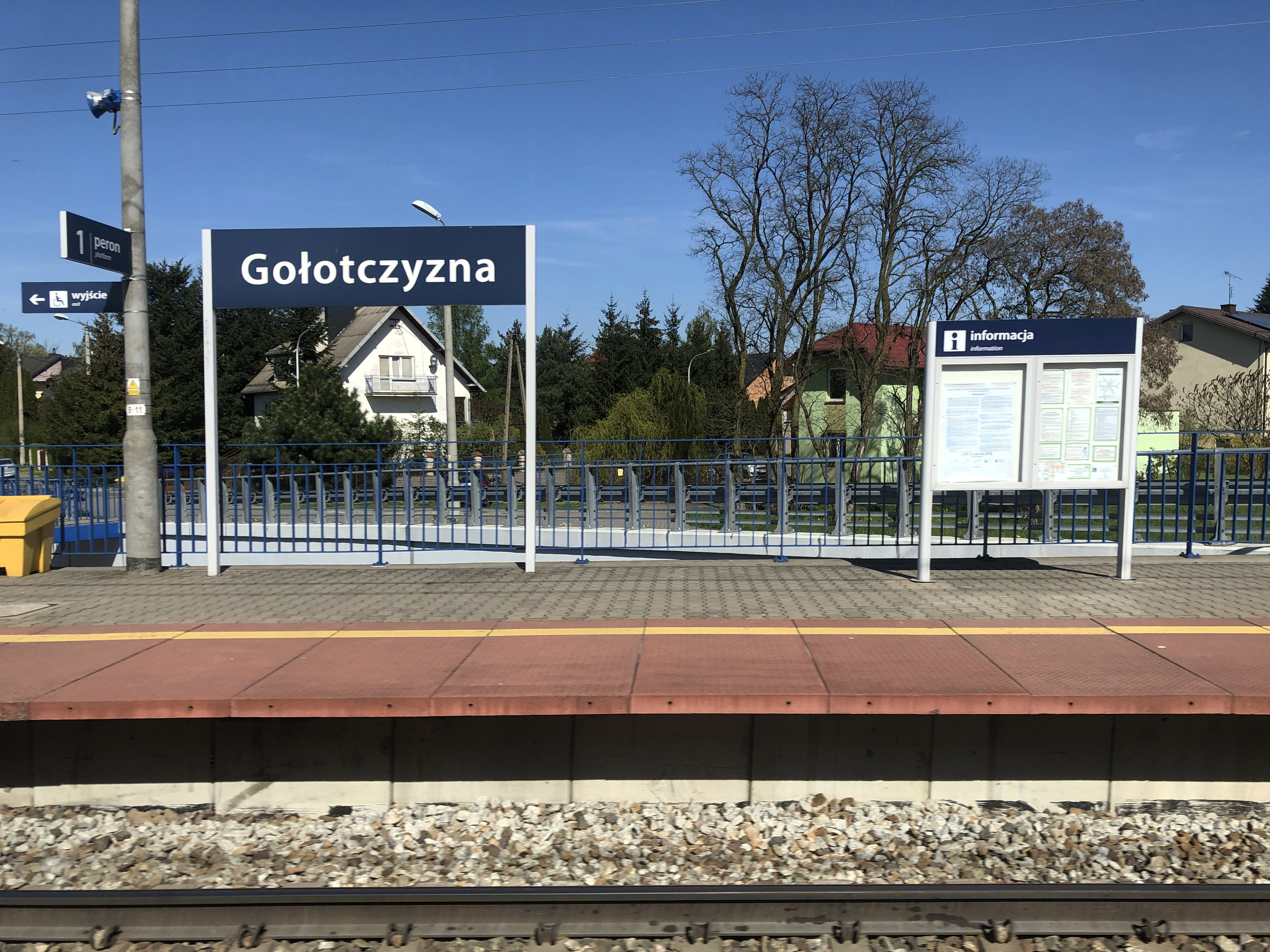

General information
- Location: Gołotczyzna-Sońsk, Sońsk, Ciechanów, Masovian; Poland
- Coordinates: 52.7380661°N 20.7215372°E
- System: Rail Station
- Owner: Polskie Koleje Państwowe S.A.

Services
Preceding station	Masovian Railways	Following station
Gąsocin towards Warszawa Zachodnia	R9	Ciechanów Przemysłowy towards Działdowo
Gąsocin towards Warszawa Zachodnia	R90	Ciechanów Przemysłowy towards Działdowo
Gąsocin towards Warszawa Zachodnia	RE9	Ciechanów towards Działdowo
Gąsocin towards Warszawa Zachodnia	RE90	Ciechanów towards Działdowo
Location

Gołotczyzna railway station is a railway station near Gołotczyzna and Sońsk, Ciechanów, Masovian, Poland. It is served by Masovian Railways.
