= Nowy Dwór Mazowiecki railway station =

Railway station in Nowy Dwór Mazowiecki, Poland

Nowy Dwór Mazowiecki
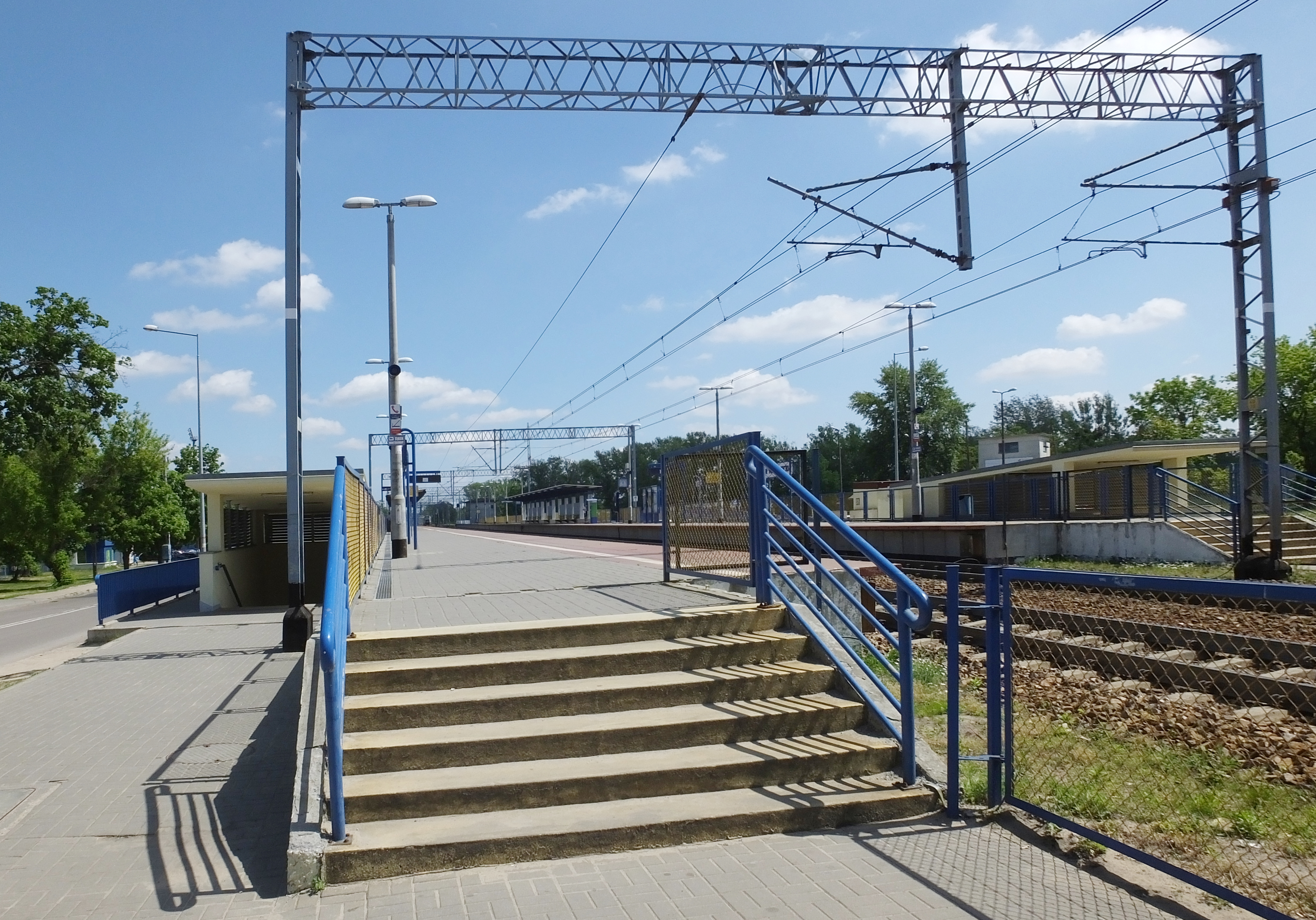
- Nowy Dwór Mazowiecki railway station

General information
- Location: Nowy Dwór Mazowiecki, Nowy Dwór, Masovian; Poland
- Coordinates: 52°25′32″N 20°46′46″E
- System: Railway Station
- Owner: Polskie Koleje Państwowe S.A.

Services
Preceding station	PKP Intercity	Following station
Legionowo towards Łódź Fabryczna	IC	Ciechanów towards Kołobrzeg
Legionowo towards Bielsko-Biała Główna or Racibórz	IC	Ciechanów towards Olsztyn Główny
Legionowo towards Łódź Fabryczna	IC	Ciechanów towards Olsztyn Główny
Ciechanów towards Gdynia Główna	TLK	Legionowo towards Zakopane
Ciechanów towards Kołobrzeg	TLK	Legionowo towards Kraków Główny
Preceding station	Masovian Railways	Following station
Janówek towards Warszawa Zachodnia	R9	Modlin towards Działdowo
Janówek towards Warszawa Zachodnia	R90	Modlin towards Działdowo
Legionowo towards Warszawa Zachodnia	RE90	Modlin towards Działdowo
Legionowo Przystanek towards Warszawa Gdańska	RE91	Modlin towards Sierpc
Legionowo Przystanek towards Warsaw Chopin Airport	RL	Modlin Terminus
Location

Nowy Dwór Mazowiecki railway station is a railway station in Nowy Dwór Mazowiecki, Masovian, Poland. It is served by Masovian Railways.

== Train services ==
The station is served by the following service(s):

- Intercity services (IC) Łódź Fabryczna — Warszawa — Gdańsk Glowny — Kołobrzeg
- Intercity services (IC) Olsztyn - Warszawa - Skierniewice - Łódź
- Intercity services (IC) Olsztyn - Warszawa - Skierniewice - Częstochowa - Katowice - Bielsko-Biała
- Intercity services (IC) Olsztyn - Warszawa - Skierniewice - Częstochowa - Katowice - Gliwice - Racibórz
- Intercity services (TLK) Gdynia Główna — Zakopane
- Intercity services (TLK) Kołobrzeg — Gdynia Główna — Warszawa Wschodnia — Kraków Główny
