= George Renny (British Army officer) =

Major-General George Renny VC
- Born: 12 May 1825; Riga, Russian Empire
- Died: 5 January 1887 (aged 61); Bath, Somerset
- Burial place: Locksbrook Cemetery; Bath, England
- Military career
- Allegiance: United Kingdom
- Branch: Bengal Army; British Army
- Rank: Major-General
- Units: Bengal Horse Artillery; Royal Artillery
- Conflicts: First Anglo-Sikh War; Indian Mutiny
- Awards: Victoria Cross

Major-General George Alexander Renny VC (12 May 1825 – 5 January 1887) was an East India Company Army and later British Army officer and a recipient of the Victoria Cross, the highest and most prestigious award for gallantry in the face of the enemy that can be awarded to British and Commonwealth forces.

== Early life and family ==
Renny was the son of Alexander Renny (1780/81–1825), a British merchant settled at Riga on the Baltic Sea, and his wife Harriett Tempest, née Blakiston (1799–1817). After moving to Scotland as a boy, he was educated at Montrose Academy and Addiscombe Military Seminary.

In June 1844 Renny was commissioned second lieutenant in the Bengal Horse Artillery, taking part in the First Sikh War, including the battle of Sobraon on 10 February 1846. In 1849 he married Flora Hastings MacWhirter, the daughter of Dr John MacWhirter, late President of the Royal College of Physicians of Edinburgh. They had three sons and three daughters.

Through his mother's second marriage, he was a half-brother of Elleanor Tempest François de Chaumont (née Gray).

== Victoria Cross action ==
Renny was 32 years old, and a Lieutenant in the Bengal Horse Artillery, Bengal Army during the Indian Mutiny on 16 September 1857 at siege of Delhi, when the following deed led to the award of the Victoria Cross:

The storming of Delhi took place between 14–16 September 1857, the aim of the British being to dislodge the mutineers and retake the city. When the Delhi Field Force renewed its advance on 16 September, its progress was steady and sustained. Siege guns had been brought into the city and began battering a breach in the repaired walls of the arsenal allowing the 61st Regiment and the Baluchi Battalion to storm the building.

Within the arsenal were no less than 171 guns and howitzers and a large quantity of ammunition. Realising the enormity of their loss, the mutineers mounted a serious counter-attack, covered by musketry fire from the roofs of nearby buildings. They set fire to the thatched roof of a shed containing explosives. With musket balls cracking around him and in imminent danger of being blown apart, Second Lieutenant Edward Thackeray of the Bengal Engineers extinguished the blaze. Simultaneously, Lieutenant George Renny of the Bengal Horse Artillery climbed the arsenal's wall and flung several shells with lighted fuses into the midst of the attackers. The carnage caused by the explosion of these put an end to the attack. Both Thackeray and Renny were awarded the Victoria Cross for their actions.

The citation in the London Gazette of 12 April 1859 read:

Delhi, Indian Mutiny, 16 September 1857, Captain George Alexander Renny, Bengal Horse Artillery.
Lieutenant-Colonel Farquhar, Commanding the 1st Belooch Regiment, reports that he was in command of the troops stationed in the Delhi magazine, after its capture on 16 September 1857. Early in the forenoon of that day, a vigorous attack was made on the post by the enemy, and was kept up with great force for some time, without the slightest chance of success. Under cover of a heavy cross fire from the high houses on the right flank of the magazine, and from Selinghur and the Palace, the enemy advanced to the high wall of the magazine, and endeavoured to set fire to a thatched roof. The roof was partially set fire to, which was extinguished at the spot by a Sepoy of the Belooch battalion, a soldier of the 61st Regiment having in vain attempted to do so. The roof having been again set on fire, Captain Renny with great gallantry mounted to the top of the wall of the magazine, and flung several shells with lighted fuzes over into the midst of the enemy, which had an almost immediate effect, as the attack at once became feeble at that point, and soon after ceased there.

George Renny was invested with his Victoria Cross by Queen Victoria at Windsor Castle on 9 November 1860.

== Later life ==
After further service during the Indian Mutiny, Renny was promoted to captain in April 1858 and to brevet major in July 1858 for his services at Delhi. Becoming a brevet lieutenant-colonel in June 1867, he commanded a battery of horse artillery during the Hazara and Black Mountain campaign of 1868. He was promoted regimental lieutenant-colonel in August 1871, and brevet colonel in August 1876. He was granted the honorary rank of major general upon retirement in December 1878.

Major-General Renny died at his home in Bath, England on 5 January 1887, aged 61, and is buried in Locksbrook Cemetery. In early 2007 his grave was cleaned and refurbished by T Battery (Shah Sujah's Troop) Royal Artillery, successor unit of the Bengal Horse Artillery.

His Victoria Cross is displayed in the Lord Ashcroft Gallery of the Imperial War Museum in London.
