= Aleksander Świętochowski =

Polish philosopher (1849–1938)

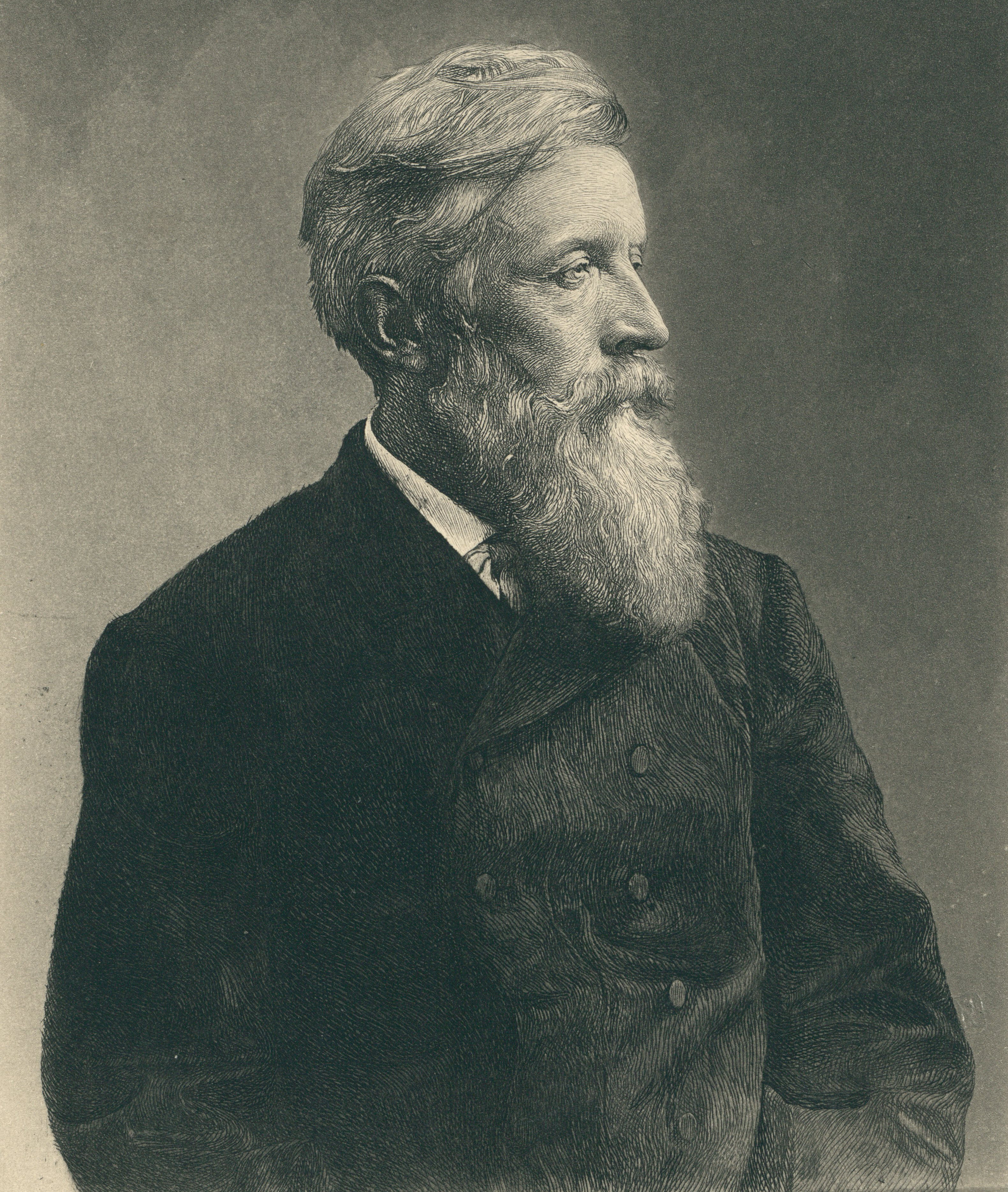
- Born: 18 January 1849; Stoczek Łukowski, Podlasie, Congress Poland
- Died: April 25, 1938 (aged 89); Gołotczyzna, near Ciechanów, Poland
- Other names: Poseł Prawdy
- Known for: Polish Positivism

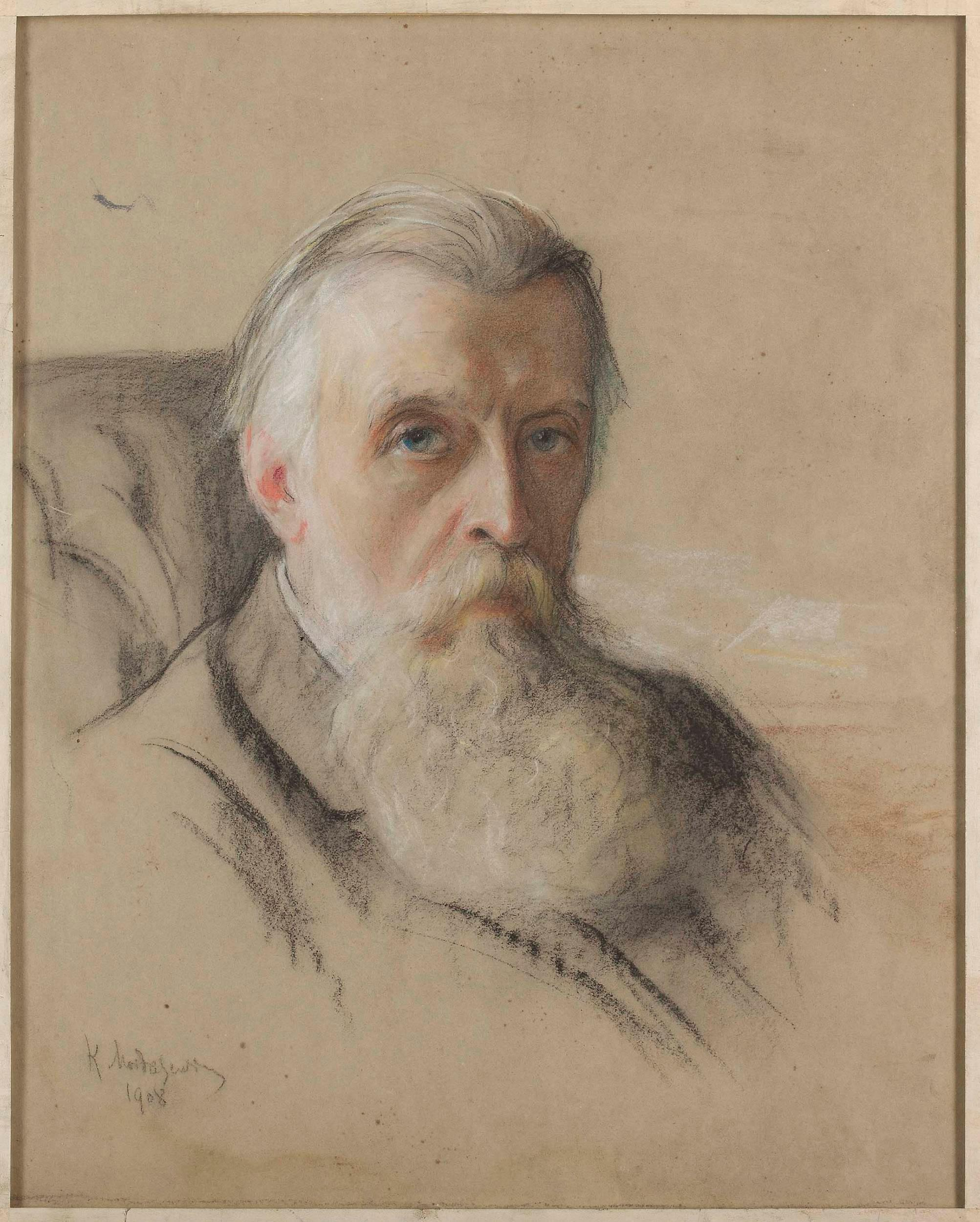
Aleksander Świętochowski, 1908

Aleksander Świętochowski (18 January 1849 – 25 April 1938) was a Polish writer, educator, and philosopher of the Positivist period that followed the January 1863 Uprising.

He was widely regarded as the prophet of Polish Positivism, spreading in the Warsaw press the gospel of scientific inquiry, education, economic development, and equality of rights for all, without regard to sex, class, ethnic origin or beliefs. His was a nuanced vision, however, that took account of the shortcomings of human nature; like H.G. Wells, he advocated that power in society be wielded by the most enlightened among its members.

== Life ==
Świętochowski was a journalist, literary critic, historian and philosopher—a founder and the leading ideologue of Polish Positivism. In 1871 he published in Przegląd Tygodniowy (The Weekly Review) a famous programmatic article of the Polish Positivists, "My i wy" ("We and You").

Świętochowski worked with many periodicals, including (1870–78) Przegląd Tygodniowy (The Weekly Review), in 1876–78 as co-editor. In 1878–79 he edited the daily Nowiny (News); when in 1882 it was bought by financier Stanisław Kronenberg, its new owner, purportedly on Świętochowski's recommendation, entrusted the editorship to Bolesław Prus.

In 1881–1902 Świętochowski edited and published Prawda (The Truth), which he had founded.

In 1881 he lost his little son. Unable to regain his equilibrium, in mid-February 1882, on the advice of Dr. Tytus Chałubiński, he went on a journey to Italy. He would recall in his Pamiętnik (Memoirs):

During my two-month journey, [Władysław] Smoleński stood in for me in editing Prawda; and, in writing columns—[Bolesław] Prus, with whom, after the fading of the memory of [our] polemical skirmishes of the "Young Press" period, I shared a renewed mutual sympathy.

In 1905 Świętochowski founded, and subsequently led, Stronnictwo Postępowo-Demokratyczne (the Progressive-Democratic Party), which after 1918 was somewhat aligned with the National Democratic Party. He worked with the National Democrats in opposing socialism, but their nationalism and racism were alien to him, and the National Democrats never regarded him as one of their own.

Świętochowski founded and was president of Towarzystwo Kultury Polskiej (the Polish Culture Society, 1906–13) and editor and publisher of its organ, Kultura Polska (Polish Culture).

From 1912 until his death in 1938, Świętochowski lived in Gołotczyzna, a village 67 kilometers north of Warsaw, where he established intimate intellectual and personal ties with Aleksandra Bąkowska. As early as 1909, he had inspired the creation, in Gołotczyzna, of a home-economics school for village girls, established by Bąkowska; and three years later, an agriculture school for boys, called Bratne. He regarded these institutions as his greatest achievement in the realm of education.

Świętochowski died at Gołotczyzna on 25 April 1938 and was buried in the cemetery at Sońsk, near Ciechanów.

His son Ryszard Świętochowski (Warsaw, 17 October 1882 – 1941, Auschwitz) was an engineer, journalist and politician who supported Władysław Sikorski, and published many papers in the field of physics; he was murdered at Auschwitz concentration camp.

== Views ==
As the leading ideologist and exponent of the latter-19th-century Polish philosophical and cultural movement known as "Polish Positivism," Świętochowski was an uncompromising critic of outdated traditions and obscurantism, and a spokesman for the fostering of knowledge and education.

A complement to this optimistic scientism was his reflections on the limitations of human nature ("Dumania pesymisty" ["Reflections of a Pessimist"], Przegląd Tygodniowy [The Weekly Review], 1876), which led him to contrast sage leaders with egotistic societal collectives. Over the years, this concern of his would recur in a number of his plays and stories.

Czesław Miłosz describes him: "A brilliant man, a sharp, even violent, polemicist against the conservatives, accused by his adversaries of haughtiness... he edited the periodical Truth (Prawda), signing his articles 'Truth's [Apostle].'"

As a creative writer [writes Miłosz], he cannot be accorded a very lofty position. He seemed even in his own day excessively cerebral; and his [play]s, for instance, are nothing but cold [pyrotechnics] of dialogues. Among his works, one of the most important is a two-volume [Brief History of Poland's Peasants].

[Nevertheless, w]hile his literary creations have not withstood the test of time and are not among the living artistic works of Polish literature, he will remain in Polish culture the personality that most fully embodied the ideals of the age, the activist and journalist most representative of the period, "the Pope of Warsaw progressivism," a tireless opponent of superstition and stupidity, the unmasker of patriotic and religious cant.

== Books ==
- Wolter (Voltaire), 1878.
- O prawach człowieka i obywatela (On the Rights of Man and the Citizen), 1907.
- Utopie w rozwoju historycznym (Utopias in Historic Development), 1910.
- Historia chłopów polskich w zarysie (Brief History of Poland's Peasants), 2 vols., 1925–28.

== See also ==
- History of philosophy in Poland
- List of Poles
