= Janówek railway station =

Railway station in Janówek Pierwszy, Poland

Janówek
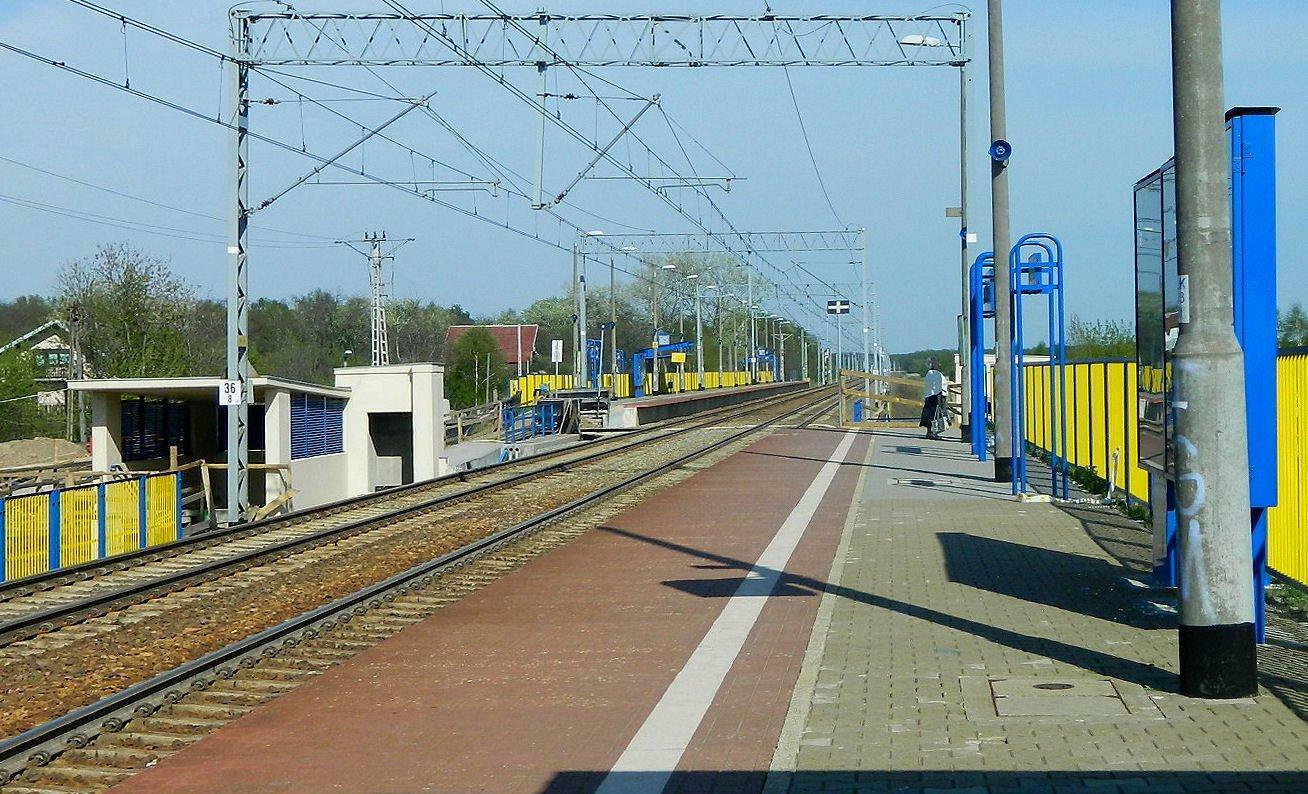

General information
- Location: Janówek, Czosnów, Nowy Dwór, Masovian; Poland
- Coordinates: 52°25′32″N 20°46′46″E
- System: Rail Station
- Owner: Polskie Koleje Państwowe S.A.

Services
Preceding station	Masovian Railways	Following station
Chotomów towards Warszawa Zachodnia	R9	Nowy Dwór Mazowiecki towards Działdowo
Chotomów towards Warszawa Zachodnia	R90	Nowy Dwór Mazowiecki towards Działdowo
Location

Janówek railway station is a railway station in Janówek, Nowy Dwór, Masovian, Poland. It is served by Masovian Railways.
