= Herbert Read (disambiguation) =

Herbert Read (1893–1968), was an English anarchist, poet, and critic of literature and art.

Herbert Read may also refer to:

- Herbert Harold Read (1889–1970), British geologist
- Herbert James Read (1863–1949), Governor of Mauritius

== See also ==
- Herbert Taylor Reade (1828–1897), Canadian recipient of the Victoria Cross
- Herbert Reed (disambiguation)
