= Ciechanów railway station =

Railway station in Masovian, Poland

Ciechanów
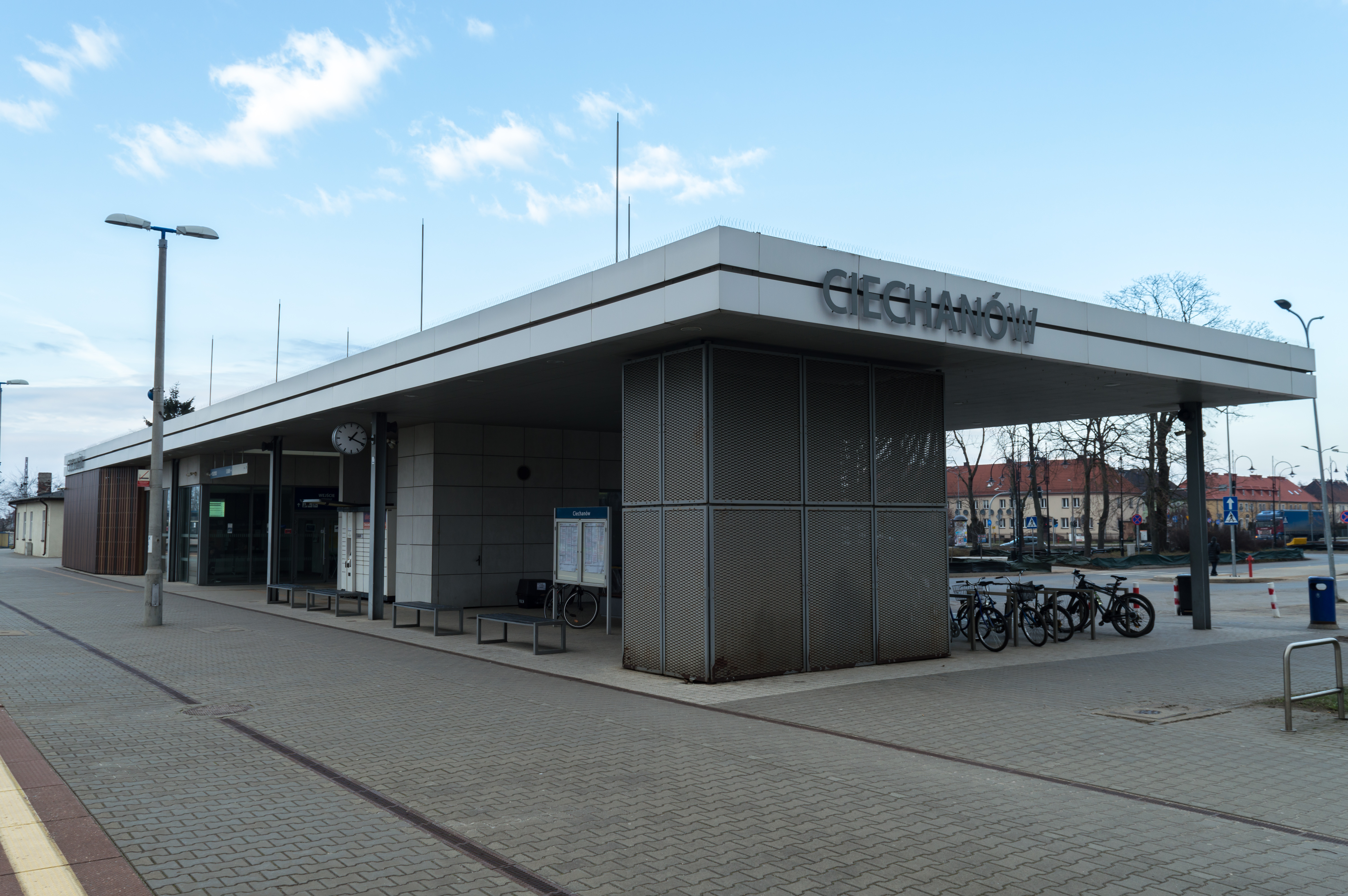

General information
- Location: Ciechanów, Ciechanów, Masovian; Poland
- Coordinates: 52.8834873°N 20.5910289°E
- System: Rail Station
- Owner: Polskie Koleje Państwowe S.A.

Services
Preceding station	PKP Intercity	Following station
Nowy Dwór Mazowiecki towards Łódź Fabryczna	IC	Mława towards Kołobrzeg
Nowy Dwór Mazowiecki towards Bielsko-Biała Główna or Racibórz	IC	Mława towards Olsztyn Główny
Nowy Dwór Mazowiecki towards Łódź Fabryczna	IC	Mława towards Olsztyn Główny
Mława towards Gdynia Główna	TLK	Nowy Dwór Mazowiecki towards Zakopane
Mława towards Kołobrzeg	TLK	Nowy Dwór Mazowiecki towards Kraków Główny
Preceding station	Masovian Railways	Following station
Ciechanów Przemysłowy towards Warszawa Zachodnia	R9	Czeruchy towards Działdowo
Ciechanów Przemysłowy towards Warszawa Zachodnia	R90	Czeruchy towards Działdowo
Gołotczyzna towards Warszawa Zachodnia	RE9	Czeruchy towards Działdowo
Gołotczyzna towards Warszawa Zachodnia	RE90	Czeruchy towards Działdowo
Location

Ciechanów railway station is a railway station at Ciechanów, Ciechanów, Masovian, Poland. It is served by Masovian Railways.

== Train services ==
The station is served by the following service(s):

- Intercity services (IC) Łódź Fabryczna — Warszawa — Gdańsk Glowny — Kołobrzeg
- Intercity services (IC) Olsztyn - Warszawa - Skierniewice - Łódź
- Intercity services (IC) Olsztyn - Warszawa - Skierniewice - Częstochowa - Katowice - Bielsko-Biała
- Intercity services (IC) Olsztyn - Warszawa - Skierniewice - Częstochowa - Katowice - Gliwice - Racibórz
- Intercity services (TLK) Gdynia Główna — Zakopane
- Intercity services (TLK) Kołobrzeg — Gdynia Główna — Warszawa Wschodnia — Kraków Główny
