= Legionowo Przystanek railway station =

Railway station in Legionowo, Poland

Legionowo Przystanek
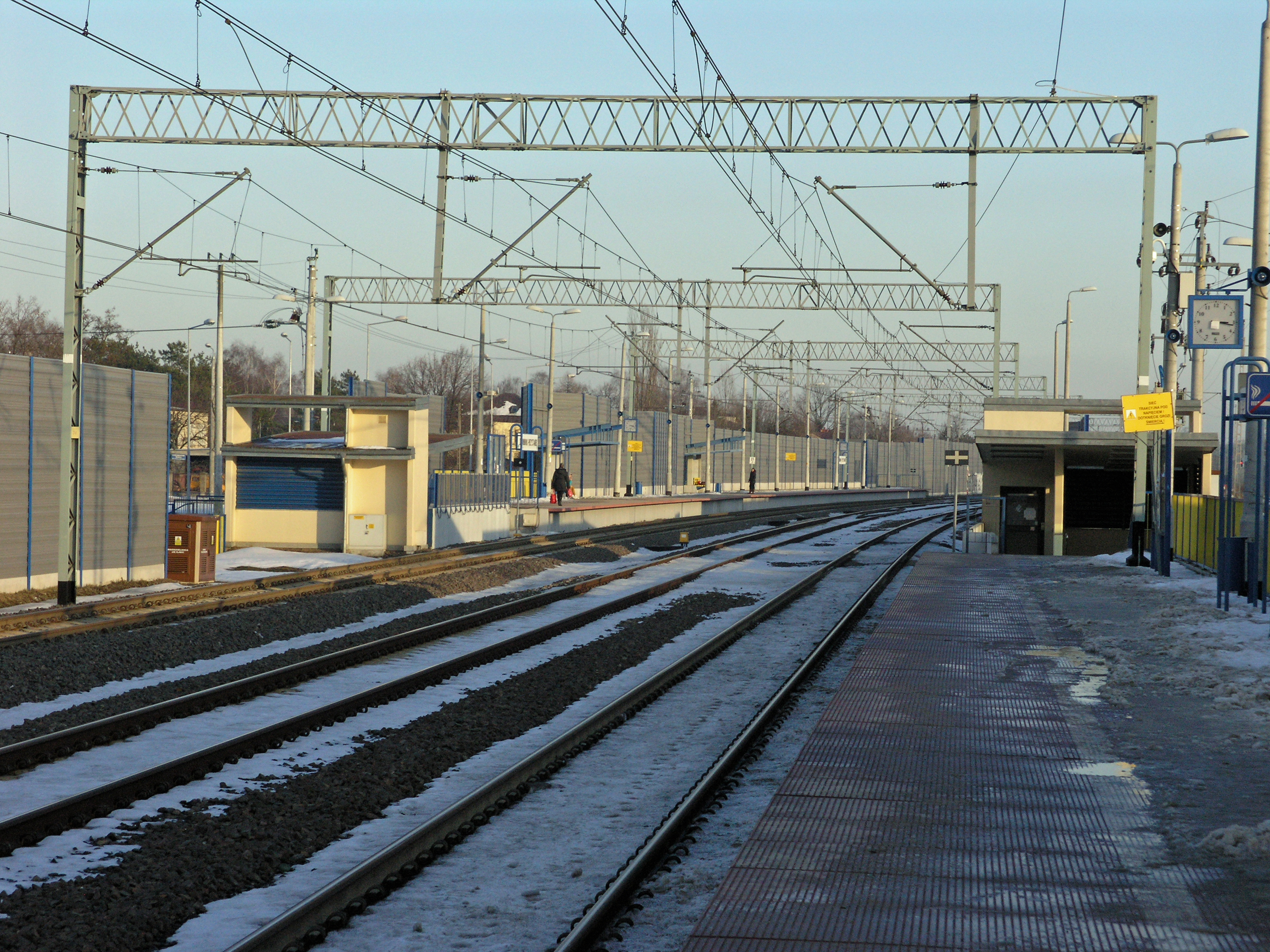

General information
- Location: Legionowo, Legionowo, Masovian; Poland
- Coordinates: 52°24′41″N 20°54′49″E
- System: Rail Station
- Owner: Polskie Koleje Państwowe S.A.

Services
Preceding station	Masovian Railways	Following station
Legionowo towards Warszawa Zachodnia	R9	Chotomów towards Działdowo
Legionowo towards Warszawa Zachodnia	R90	Chotomów towards Działdowo
Legionowo towards Warszawa Gdańska	RE91	Chotomów towards Sierpc
Legionowo towards Warsaw Chopin Airport	RL	Chotomów towards Modlin
Location

Legionowo Przystanek railway station is a railway station in Legionowo, Poland. It is served by Masovian Railways.
