= 1977–78 Anglo-Scottish Cup =

Tournament details
- Country: England; Scotland
- Teams: 24

Final positions
- Champions: Bristol City
- Runners-up: St Mirren

The 1977–78 Anglo-Scottish Cup was the third edition of the tournament. It was won by Bristol City, who beat St Mirren in a two-legged final by 3–2 on aggregate.

== English group ==
=== Group A ===
Home team	Result	Away team	Date
Burnley	2–1	Blackburn Rovers	2 August 1977
Blackburn Rovers	3–1	Blackpool	6 August 1977
Bolton Wanderers	1–0	Burnley	6 August 1977
Burnley	0–4	Blackpool	9 August 1977
Blackburn Rovers	2–0	Bolton Wanderers	10 August 1977
Blackpool	0–1	Bolton Wanderers	13 August 1977

Team	Pld	W	D	L	GF	GA	GD	BP	Pts
Blackburn Rovers	3	2	0	1	6	3	+3	1	5
Bolton Wanderers	3	2	0	1	2	2	0	0	4
Blackpool	3	1	0	2	5	4	+1	1	3
Burnley	3	1	0	2	2	6	-4	0	2

=== Group B ===
Home team	Result	Away team	Date
Bristol Rovers	0–1	Plymouth Argyle	30 July 1977
Bristol City	3–1	Bristol Rovers	6 August 1977
Plymouth Argyle	1–1	Birmingham City	6 August 1977
Bristol Rovers	1–1	Birmingham City	9 August 1977
Plymouth Argyle	0–2	Bristol City	9 August 1977
Birmingham City	1–0	Bristol City	12 August 1977

Team	Pld	W	D	L	GF	GA	GD	BP	Pts
Bristol City	3	2	0	1	5	2	+3	1	5
Birmingham City	3	1	2	0	3	2	+1	0	4
Plymouth Argyle	3	1	1	1	2	3	-1	0	3
Bristol Rovers	3	0	1	2	2	5	-3	0	1

=== Group C ===
Home team	Result	Away team	Date
Fulham	1–0	Orient	2 August 1977
Fulham	1–0	Chelsea	6 August 1977
Norwich City	1–1	Orient	6 August 1977
Chelsea	2–0	Orient	9 August 1977
Norwich City	0–0	Fulham	10 August 1977
Chelsea	2–2	Norwich City	13 August 1977

Team	Pld	W	D	L	GF	GA	GD	BP	Pts
Fulham	3	3	0	0	3	0	+3	0	6
Chelsea	3	1	1	1	4	3	+1	0	3
Norwich City	3	0	2	1	3	4	-1	0	2
Orient	3	0	1	2	1	4	-3	0	1

=== Group D ===
Home team	Result	Away team	Date
Notts County	1–0	Hull City	6 August 1977
Oldham Athletic	2–3	Sheffield United	6 August 1977
Hull City	0–2	Sheffield United	9 August 1977
Oldham Athletic	0–0	Notts County	9 August 1977
Hull City	2–0	Oldham Athletic	13 August 1977
Sheffield United	4–5	Notts County	13 August 1977

Team	Pld	W	D	L	GF	GA	GD	BP	Pts
Notts County	3	2	1	0	4	0	+4	1	6
Sheffield United	3	2	0	1	5	5	0	2	6
Oldham Athletic	3	0	2	1	3	4	-1	0	2
Hull City	3	0	1	2	1	4	-3	0	1

== Scottish group ==
=== 1st round 1st leg ===
Home team	Result	Away team	Date
Stirling Albion	1–4	St Mirren	3 August 1977
Motherwell	7–0	Alloa Athletic	6 August 1977
Partick Thistle	3–0	Clydebank	8 August 1977
Hibernian	2–1	Ayr United	10 August 1977

=== 1st round 2nd leg ===
Home team	Result	Away team	Date
Alloa Athletic	1–4	Motherwell	10 August 1977
Clydebank	1–1	Partick Thistle	10 August 1977
Ayr United	2–2	Hibernian	22 August 1977
St Mirren	3–0	Stirling Albion	24 August 1977

== Quarter-finals 1st leg ==
Home team	Result	Away team	Date
Fulham	1–1	St Mirren	13 September 1977
Motherwell	1–1	Notts County	13 September 1977
Partick Thistle	2–0	Bristol City	13 September 1977
Hibernian	2–1	Blackburn Rovers	14 September 1977

== Quarter-finals 2nd leg ==
Home team	Result	Away team	Date
St Mirren	5–3	Fulham	26 September 1977
Bristol City	3–0	Partick Thistle	27 September 1977
Notts County	1–0	Motherwell	27 September 1977
Blackburn Rovers	0–1	Hibernian	28 September 1977

== Semi-finals 1st leg ==
Home team	Result	Away team	Date
Notts County	1–0	St Mirren	18 October 1977
Hibernian	1–1	Bristol City	19 October 1977

== Semi-finals 2nd leg ==
Home team	Result	Away team	Date
Bristol City	5–3	Hibernian	1 November 1977
St Mirren	2–0	Notts County	1 November 1977

== Final 1st leg ==
23 November 1977
19:30 BST

St Mirren	1 – 2	Bristol City
Abercromby 87'		Gow 1' Cormack 73'

St Mirren Park, Love Street, Paisley
Attendance: 8,000

== Final 2nd leg ==
5 December 1977
19:30 BST

Bristol City	1 – 1	St Mirren
Mabbutt 72'		Reid 68'

Ashton Gate, Bristol
Attendance: 16,110

== Notes and references ==
- "Anglo-Scottish Cup 1977/1978". Football Club History Database.
