= Ciechanów Przemysłowy railway station =

Railway station in Masovian, Poland

Ciechanów Przemysłowy
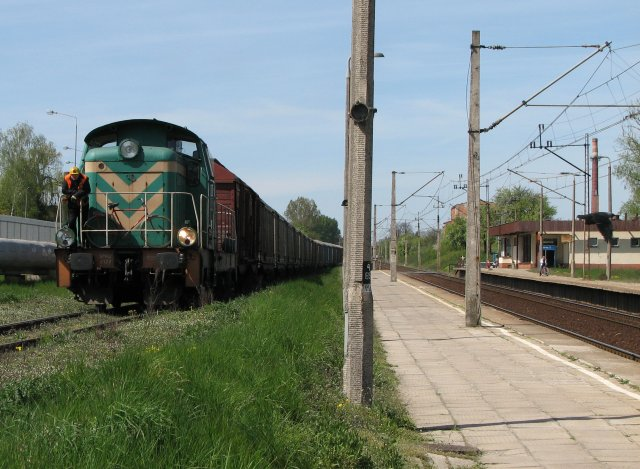

General information
- Location: Ciechanów Industrial Estate, Ciechanów, Masovian; Poland
- Coordinates: 52.8647243°N 20.6162524°E
- System: Rail Station
- Owner: Polskie Koleje Państwowe S.A.

Services
Preceding station	Masovian Railways	Following station
Gołotczyzna towards Warszawa Zachodnia	R9	Ciechanów towards Działdowo
Gołotczyzna towards Warszawa Zachodnia	R90	Ciechanów towards Działdowo
Location

Ciechanów Przemysłowy railway station is a railway station at Ciechanów Industrial Estate, Ciechanów, Masovian, Poland. It is served by Masovian Railways.
