= Hubert Reed =

Hubert Reed or Reid may refer to:

- Hub Reed, basketball player
- Hubert Reed, character in The Negotiator (novel)
- Hubert Reid, see 1906–07 South Africa rugby union tour

== See also ==
- Bert Reed, American football player
