= Robert Reed (disambiguation) =

Robert Reed (1932–1992) was an American stage and television actor.

Robert, Rob, Bob or Bobby Reed may also refer to:

== Law and politics ==
- Robert R. Reed (1807–1864), American politician, U.S. Representative from Pennsylvania
- Robert Reed, Baron Reed of Allermuir (born 1956), Scottish judge

== Music ==
- Rob Reed, keyboardist with Welsh progressive rock band Magenta
- Bob Reed, bassist for The Trashmen

== Religion ==
- Robert Reed (bishop, died 1415), bishop in Ireland and England
- Robert P. Reed (born 1959), American Roman Catholic bishop

== Sports ==
- Bob Reed (runner) (born c. 1930), 1952 5000 m All-American for the Stanford Cardinal track and field team
- Bobby Reed (American football) (born 1939), American football player for the Minnesota Vikings and Winnipeg Blue Bombers
- Robert Reed (guard) (1943–2009), American football player
- Bob Reed (baseball) (born 1945), American baseball player
- Robert Reed (wide receiver) (born 1975), American football wide receiver

== Others ==
- Robert H. Reed (1929–2017), general in the United States Air Force
- Robert Reed (artist) (1938–2014), American artist
- Robert Reed (author) (born 1956), American science fiction author
- Bobby Reed, fictional character in American TV series The Wire; see Police of The Wire#Bobby Reed
- Robby Reed, fictional character from DC Comics' Dial H for Hero

== See also ==
- Bert Reed (born 1988), American football player
- Bertie Reed (1943–2006), South African yachtsman
- Robert Read (1814–1896), Canadian businessman and politician
- Robert Read (cricketer) (1870–1945), New Zealand cricketer
- Bob Reade (1932–2020), American football player and coach
- Sir Robert Rede (died 1519), English judge
- Robert Reid (disambiguation)
