= Albert Read =

Albert Read may refer to:

- Albert Cushing Read (1887–1967), aviator and US Navy admiral
- Albert Read (footballer) (1893–1959), English international footballer
- Albert Read (executive), managing director of Condé Nast Britain
- Albert Read, founder of Science Discovery Center of Oneonta

== See also ==
- Bert Read, footballer
- Al Read (1909–1987), comedian
- Albert Reed (disambiguation)
- Albert Reid (disambiguation)
