= Albert Reid (disambiguation) =

Albert Reid was an Australian politician.

Albert Reid may also refer to:

- Albert Reid, editor of The Record (Sherbrooke)

== See also ==
- Bert Reid (disambiguation)
- Albert Reed (disambiguation)
- Albert Read (disambiguation)
