= Ryszard Świętochowski =

Polish politician (1882–1941)

Ryszard Świętochowski (17 September 1882 in Warsaw – 1941 in Auschwitz) was a Polish politician, publicist and engineer. He was the son of Aleksander Świętochowski.

Swiętochowski was an activist of SP and People's Party, co-worker of general Władysław Sikorski, editor-in-chief of the weekly magazines Zwrot and Odnowa and author of several scientific works in physics.

During the Second World War and the German occupation of Poland, he was murdered in the German concentration camp Auschwitz.
