= Gołotczyzna =

- Village
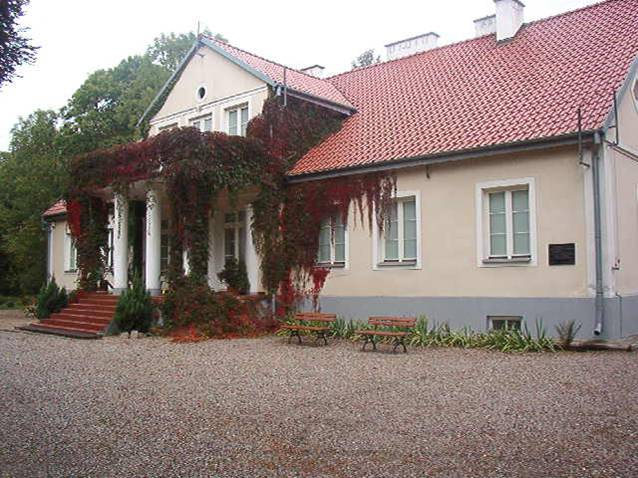
- Villa Krzewina

- Location within Poland
- Coordinates: 52°47′N 20°41′E
- Country: Poland
- Voivodeship: Masovian
- County: Ciechanów
- Gmina: Sońsk

Population
  - Total: 727
- Time zone: UTC+1 (CET)
  - Summer (DST): UTC+2 (CEST)
- Postal code: 06-430
- Vehicle registration: WCI

Gołotczyzna [ɡɔwɔtˈt͡ʂɨzna] is a village in the administrative district of Gmina Sońsk, within Ciechanów County, Masovian Voivodeship, in north-central Poland.

== History ==
Gołotczyzna was a private village of the Ostoja-Ostaszewski noble family, administratively located in the Masovian Voivodeship in the Greater Poland Province of the Kingdom of Poland.

In 1827 Gołotczyzna had a population of 30, which by the 1880s grew to 122. According to the 1921 census, the village with the adjacent manor farm had a population of 141, entirely Polish by nationality and 95.0% Roman Catholic by confession.

During the Korean War, in 1951–1953, Poland admitted 200 North Korean orphans in the village.

== Sights ==
Villa Krzewina, the former home of Polish writer and philosopher Aleksander Świętochowski, houses the Positivism Museum.

== Transport ==
There is a railway station in the village.

== Notable people ==
- Aleksander Świętochowski (1849–1938), Polish writer, educator, and philosopher of the Positivist period
