= Soldiers of Gloucestershire Museum =

Military museum in Gloucester, England

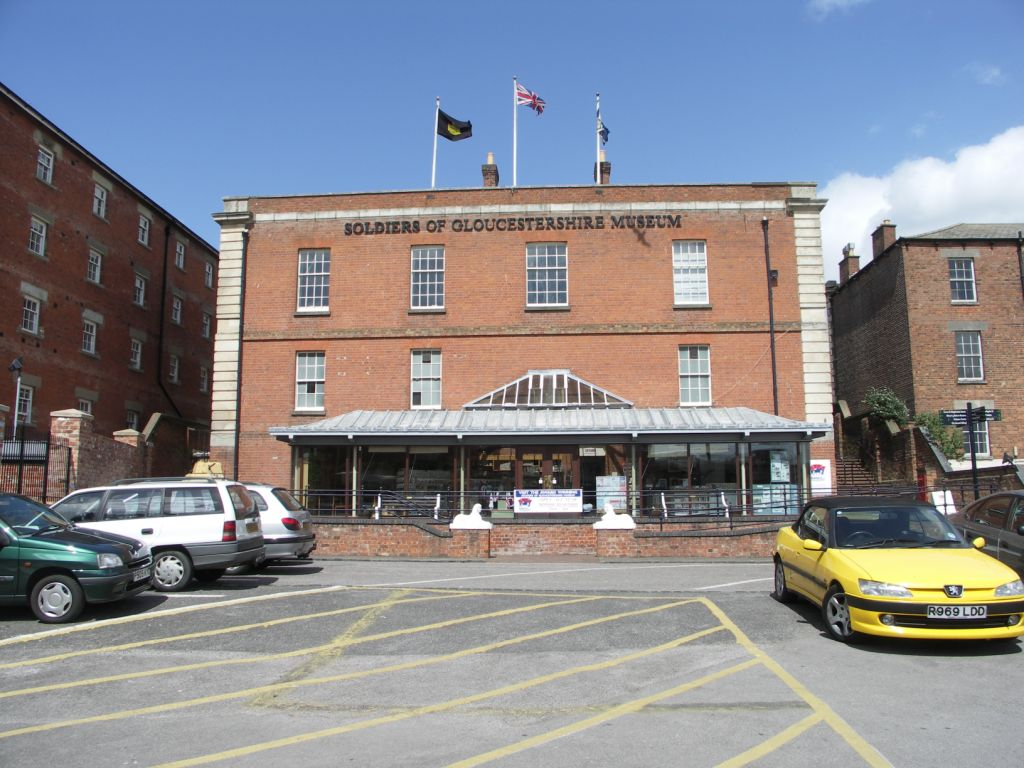
- Soldiers of Gloucestershire Museum

- Shown in Gloucestershire
- Established: 1926
- Location: Gloucester Docks
- Coordinates: 51.8639°N 2.2501°W
- Type: Military
- Website: www.soldiersofglos.com

The Soldiers of Gloucestershire Museum is located within the historic docks in the city of Gloucester. The museum tells the story of two regiments of the British Army, the Gloucestershire Regiment, including its antecedents the 28th (North Gloucestershire) Regiment of Foot and the 61st (South Gloucestershire) Regiment of Foot, and the Royal Gloucestershire Hussars, both of which recruited heavily from Gloucestershire and Bristol.

== History ==
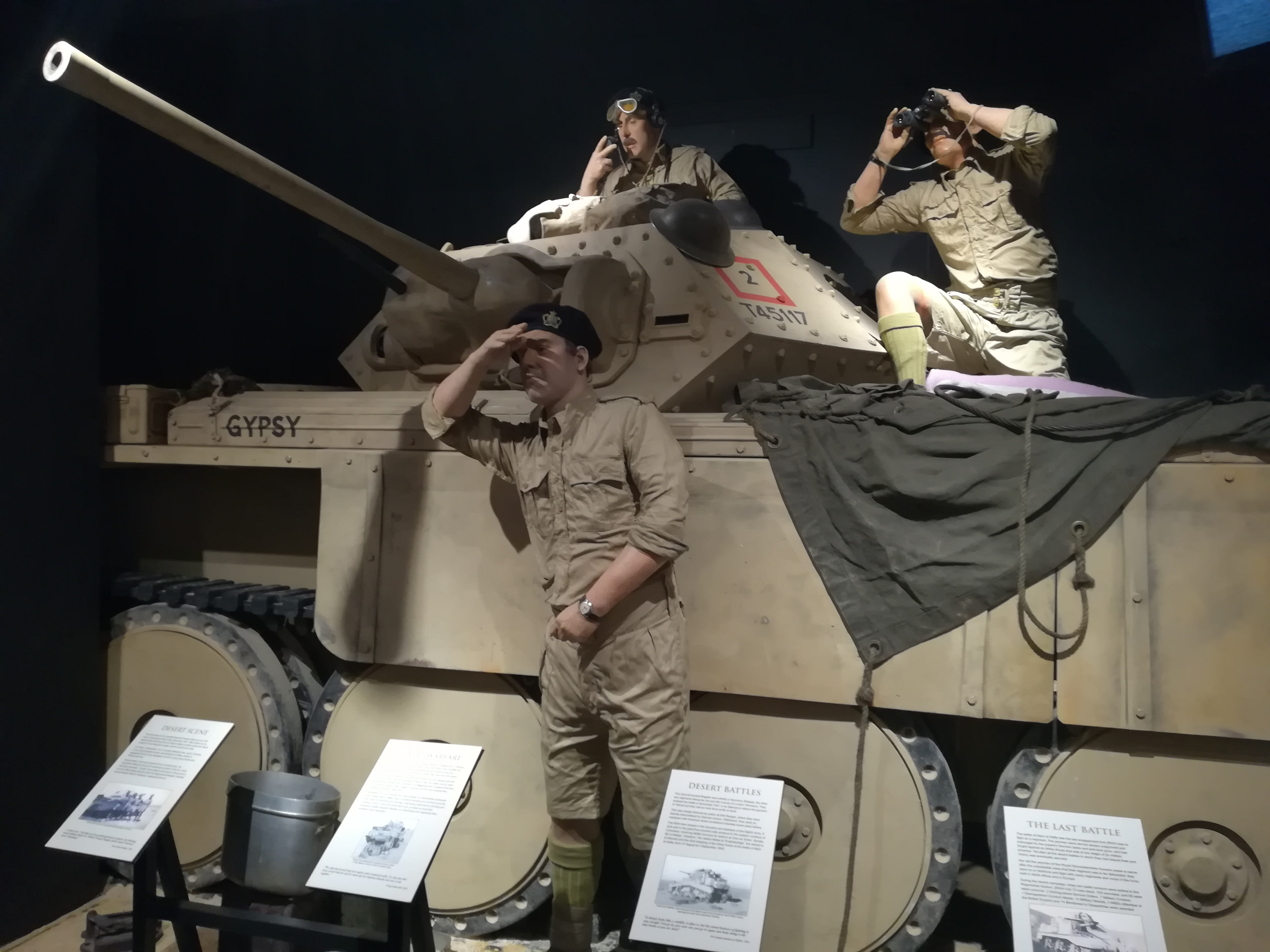
Royal Gloucestershire Hussars exhibit in the museum

The museum collection was begun in 1926, when it was housed at Victoria Dock in Bristol. In 1980, having spent the previous 30 years located in Westgate Street, Gloucester, it was moved again to the former Custom House in Gloucester Docks, and the new museum was formally opened by The Duke of Gloucester. It was significantly remodelled in the late 1980s, reopening on 24 June 1990, and was further refurbished in the 2010s with a grant from the Heritage Lottery Fund, reopening again in April 2014.

The items on display have been accumulated over the last 300 years and exhibits include life size dioramas, sound effects, archive film and many fixed displays reflecting campaigns in the Napoleonic Wars, the First Anglo-Sikh War, the Second Anglo-Sikh War, the Indian Mutiny, the Second Boer War, the First World War, the Second World War, the Korean War, and peace keeping duties in Cyprus, Bosnia, Kosovo and Northern Ireland. The museum has maintained the currency of its exhibits and recent campaigns in Iraq and Afghanistan are also represented.

The Victoria Crosses of Herbert Taylor Reade of the 61st Regiment, and Daniel Burges, James Carne and Hardy Falconer Parsons, all of the Gloucestershire Regiment, are held by the museum.

The museum continues to receive new exhibits and the most recent significant acquisition is a service revolver collected from Gloster Hill, where the Glosters made their last stand on 25 April 1951 at the culmination of the Battle of the Imjin River.

== Displays ==
The museum is laid out in a series of rooms in approximate chronological order:

- The Early Years - Of particular note here are some fine miniature paintings of officers from the 18th and early 19th centuries. Also some interesting paintings of the Gloucestershire Militias in the 19th century.
- The Napoleonic Room - On view here are some items of equipment and uniform, as well as some fine medals from the Peninsular War and Waterloo.
- The 19th Century Room - Includes some unusual examples of early uniforms and memorabilia from the 28th's time in Australia and the Crimean War.
- World War I Room (1) - Features weapons, drawings and artefacts from the period.
- World War II Room (2) - Of especial note here is the audio-visual display about the bitter actions fought by the Gloucesters' rearguard at Dunkirk in 1940.
- Royal Gloucestershire Hussars Rooms - Includes some very fine silverware, uniforms and paintings from their inception in the 1790s until after the Second World War.
- Korean War Room - Artefacts plus an audio-visual display of the dramatic story told by the soldiers themselves who fought at the Imjin River in 1951.
- National Service Room - Many items on display covering the period of British Army National Service from the late 1940s to the early 1960s.
- World War I and World War II Rooms (2) - Lifelike tableaux of a trench and dugout from 1916 and fighting in Burma in 1944.
- Medal Cabinets - 24 drawers containing interesting medal groups of soldiers from the Gloucestershire Regiment and Royal Gloucestershire Hussars.

== The Custom House ==
The Custom House housing the museum is early Victorian building completed in 1845 to a design by architect Sydney Smirke, who by coincidence also designed the building now occupied by the Imperial War Museum in Lambeth.

Construction

By the early 1840s it had become clear that the Old Custom House was inadequate for the amount of trade then going through the Port of Gloucester. So, in February 1843 a suitable site for a completely new building adjacent to the docks was identified. However it took over a year to complete the legal formalities. Eventually, work started in April 1844, and in spite of a late decision to face the walls with Painswick stone instead of brick, the building was roofed out by October of that year. Work then continued inside, including the late addition of a door between the Comptroller's office and the Long Room where the clerks were to work. When the final payment was made to the contractor in September 1845, the total cost, including land and fittings, came to £5,780.

Role as a Customs House

Thus from late 1845 the building was occupied by the Collector of Customs and his staff, who were mainly responsible for recording cargoes brought to Gloucester from foreign ports and for collecting the customs duty payable on those goods. In addition some clerks undertook the registration of locally owned vessels on behalf of the Board of Trade and maintained service records of the masters and crews who served in these vessels. Also during the 19th century, part of the building was lived in by one of the customs officers. Eventually the handling of foreign cargoes mainly moved to Sharpness and activity in the Port of Gloucester declined. However the Custom House continued to function as an administrative office until the late 1970s.

A New Role

After the customs staff moved out, the building took on a new life as the headquarters of the Gloucestershire Regiment, including a museum, opened initially in 1980. At that time the entrance to the museum was from Commercial Road, but in view of the redevelopment of the docks for leisure and following a public appeal, the museum was reorganised and reopened in 1990 with an entrance at what had been the back of the original building, but facing the docks.

== Bibliography ==
- Daniell, David Scott (1975). Cap of Honour. George G Harrap. ISBN 0-7509-4172-3.
