= Mława railway station =

Railway station in Mława, Poland

Mława
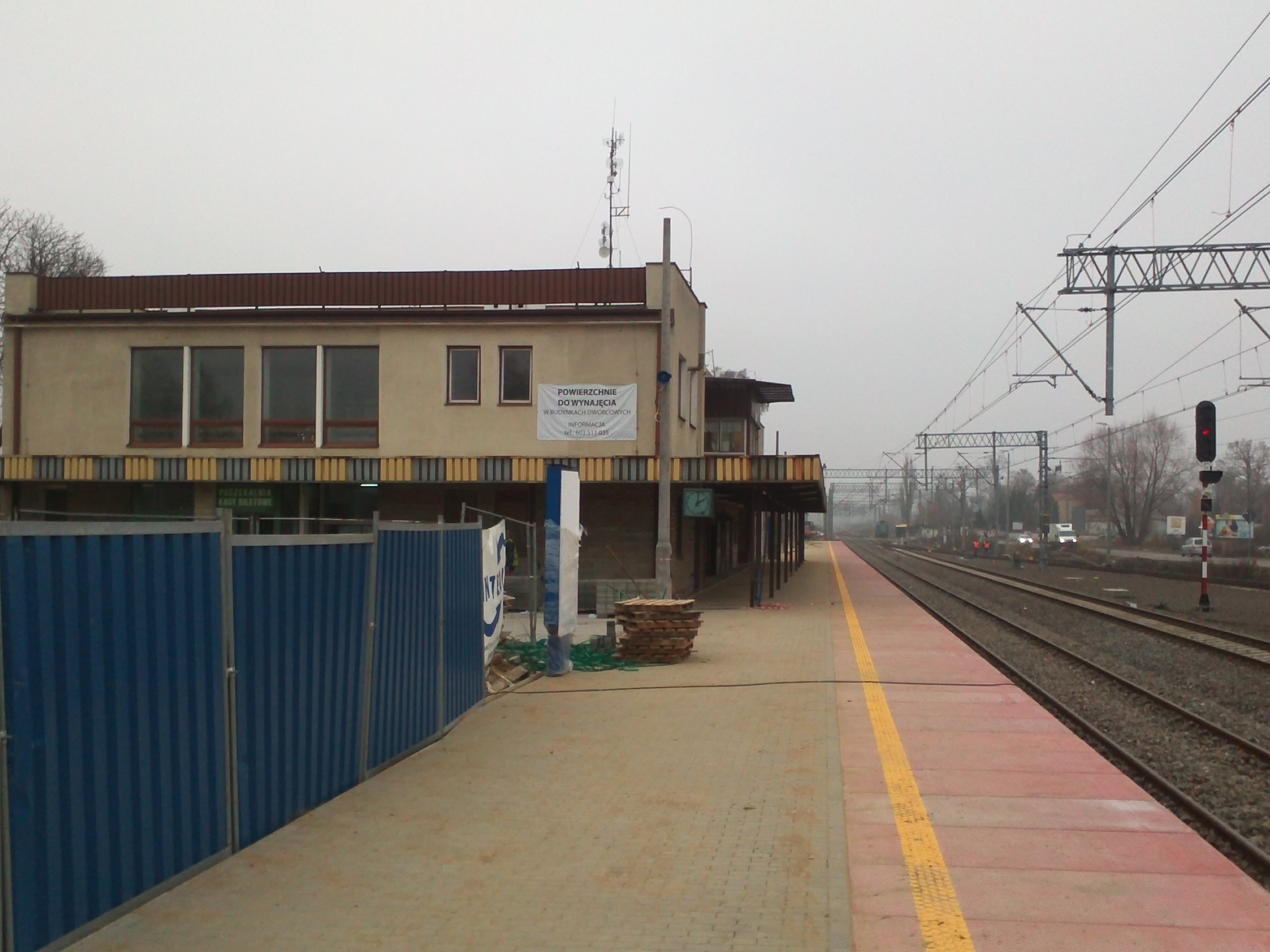

General information
- Location: Mława, Mława, Masovian; Poland
- Coordinates: 53.1248374°N 20.3525378°E
- System: Rail Station
- Owner: Polskie Koleje Państwowe S.A.

Services
Preceding station	PKP Intercity	Following station
Ciechanów towards Łódź Fabryczna	IC	Działdowo towards Kołobrzeg
Ciechanów towards Bielsko-Biała Główna or Racibórz	IC	Działdowo towards Olsztyn Główny
Ciechanów towards Łódź Fabryczna	IC	Działdowo towards Olsztyn Główny
Działdowo towards Gdynia Główna	TLK	Ciechanów towards Zakopane
Działdowo towards Kołobrzeg	TLK	Ciechanów towards Kraków Główny
Preceding station	Masovian Railways	Following station
Mława Miasto towards Warszawa Zachodnia	R9	Iłowo towards Działdowo
Mława Miasto towards Warszawa Zachodnia	R90	Iłowo towards Działdowo
Mława Miasto towards Warszawa Zachodnia	RE9	Iłowo towards Działdowo
Mława Miasto towards Warszawa Zachodnia	RE90	Iłowo towards Działdowo
Location

Mława railway station is a railway station at Mława, Mława County, Masovian, Poland. It is served by Masovian Railways.

== Train services ==
The station is served by the following service(s):

- Intercity services (IC) Łódź Fabryczna — Warszawa — Gdańsk Glowny — Kołobrzeg
- Intercity services (IC) Olsztyn - Warszawa - Skierniewice - Łódź
- Intercity services (IC) Olsztyn - Warszawa - Skierniewice - Częstochowa - Katowice - Bielsko-Biała
- Intercity services (IC) Olsztyn - Warszawa - Skierniewice - Częstochowa - Katowice - Gliwice - Racibórz
- Intercity services (TLK) Gdynia Główna — Zakopane
- Intercity services (TLK) Kołobrzeg — Gdynia Główna — Warszawa Wschodnia — Kraków Główny
