= Wise old man =

Jungian and literary archetype

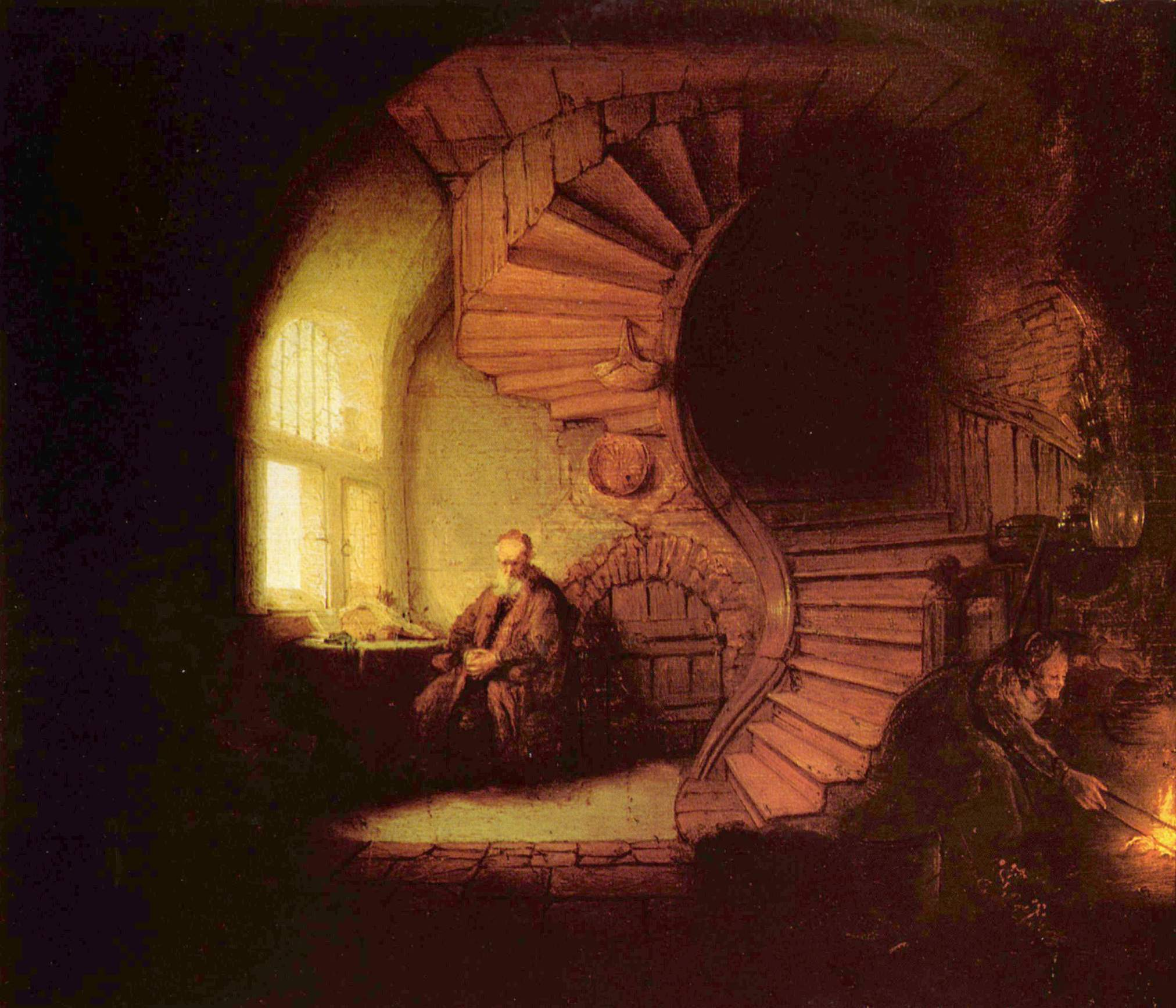
A wise old man: Philosopher in Meditation by Rembrandt

The wise old man (also called senex, sage or sophos) is an archetype as described by Carl Jung, as well as a classic literary figure, and may be seen as a stock character. The wise old man can be a profound philosopher distinguished for wisdom and sound judgment.

== Traits ==
This character is typically represented as a kind and wise elderly father figure who uses personal knowledge of people and the world to help tell stories and offer guidance that may in a mystical way impress upon his audience a sense of who they are and who they might become, thereby acting as a mentor. He may occasionally appear as an absent-minded professor, seeming absent-minded due to a predilection for contemplative pursuits.

The wise old man is often seen to be from a different culture, nation, or occasionally time, from those he advises. In extreme cases, he may be a liminal being, such as Merlin, who was only half human.

In medieval chivalric romance and modern fantasy literature, he is often presented as a wizard. He can also or instead be featured as a hermit. This character type often explained to the knights or heroes—particularly those searching for the Holy Grail—the significance of their encounters.

In storytelling, a few times the character of the wise old man is in some way removed for a time in order to allow the hero/heroine to develop on his/her own.

== Jungian psychology ==
In Jungian analytical psychology, senex is the specific term used in association with this archetype. In ancient Rome, the title of Senex (Latin for old man) was only awarded to elderly men with families who had good standing in their village; the title senator derives from this. Examples of the senex archetype in a positive form include the wise old man or wizard.

In Jungian individuation process, the archetype of the wise old man was late to emerge, and was seen as an indication of the Self: "If an individual has wrestled seriously enough and long enough with the anima (or animus) problem...the unconscious again changes its dominant character and appears in a new symbolic form...as a masculine initiator and guardian (an Indian guru), a wise old man, a spirit of nature, and so forth'.

The antithetical archetype, or enantiodromic opposite, of the senex is the Puer Aeternus.

== In religion ==
=== Judaism and Christianity ===
Abraham, Moses, Solomon, Methuselah, Simeon, Joseph and Paul the Apostle and many others are considered wise old men in Judeo-Christian tradition. The basic sentence of the New Testament and Old Testament gerontology, which is equally binding for the Jewish and for the Christian religion, is: A long and fulfilling life is a gift from God. Those who die "old and full of life" are happy. In the Books of Moses a long life is promised, among other things, to those who honor father and mother and who do not use false weights.

Many attitudes toward old age in the Western world have origins in the Old Testament and New Testament. Age has been associated with prudence, experience, insight and wisdom, but also weaknesses such as declining physical health and sensory performance. Biblical references state that although wisdom is a gift of old age, even the elderly are not protected against youthful folly and that "gray hair is a splendid crown / one finds it on the path of righteousness."

As a child, Jesus debated religious issues side by side with wise elders.

== Cultural references ==
In fiction, a wise old man is often presented in the form of a wizard or other magician in medieval chivalric romance and modern fantasy literature and films, in the style of Merlin. Notable examples include Gandalf from The Hobbit and The Lord of the Rings, Albus Dumbledore from Harry Potter and Obi-Wan Kenobi from Star Wars.

"Senex" is the name of a wise old character in the novel A Wind in the Door by Madeleine L'Engle.

Around the 1850s, the antiquarian Robert Reid used the pseudonym "Senex" when contributing articles on local history in the Glasgow Herald. These were later published in a series of volumes. Sir Alan Lascelles used the penname "Senex" when writing to The Times in 1950 setting out the so-called Lascelles Principles concerning the monarch's right to refuse a prime minister's request for a general election.

== See also ==
- Analytical psychology
- Elderly martial arts master
- Hermit
- Hero's journey
- Ivory tower
- Magical Negro
- Magicians in fantasy
- Masonic
- Philosopher in Meditation
- Sage
- Wise Old Man/Woman
- Yogi
