= Locksbrook Cemetery =

Cemetery in Bath, England

Coordinates: 51°23′10″N 02°23′12″W

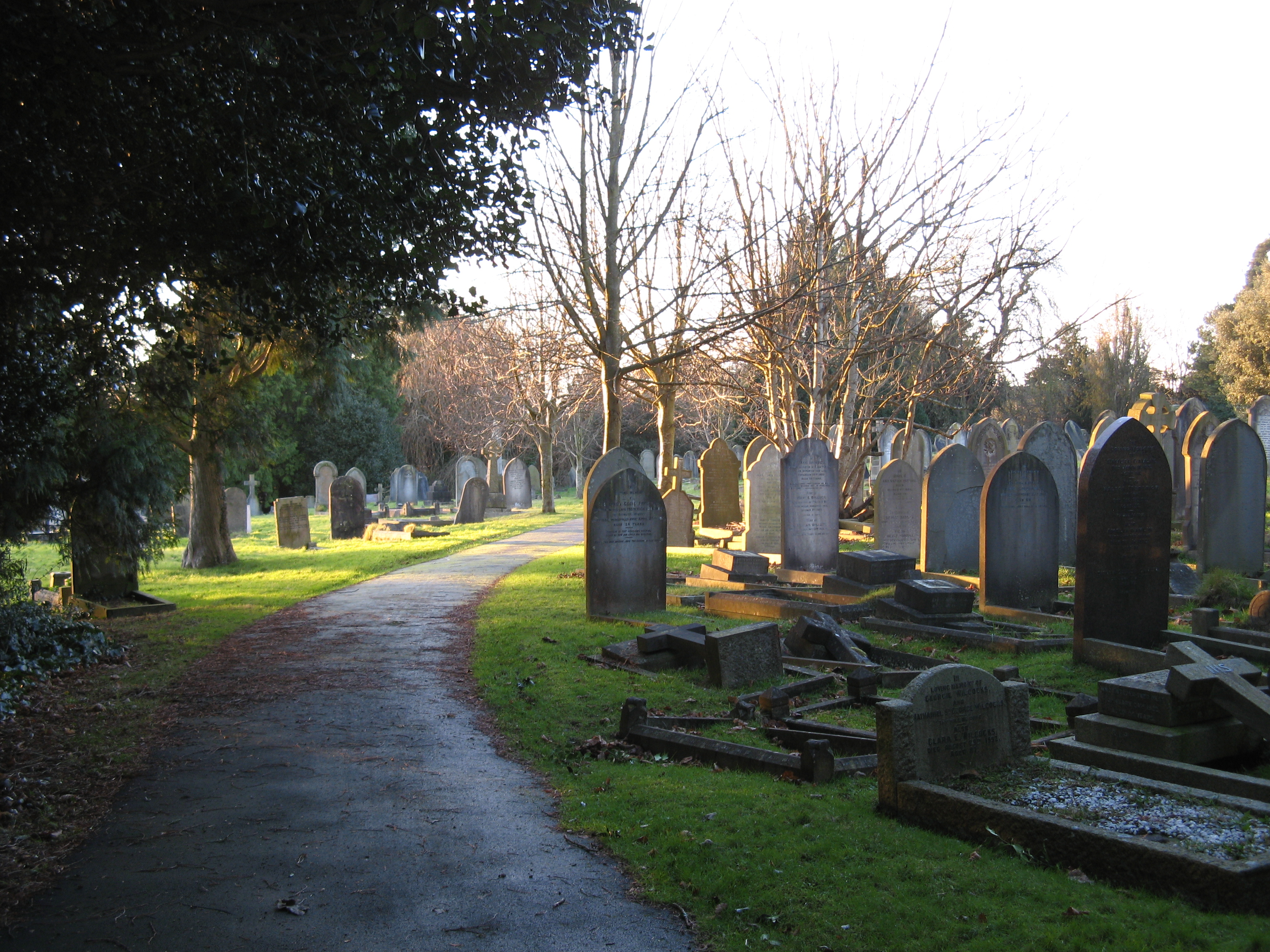
West side of cemetery

Locksbrook Cemetery is a municipal cemetery located in Lower Weston, Bath, England. It was opened in 1864 as Walcot Cemetery, and occupies 12 acres (4.9 ha), originally serving the parishes of Walcot, Weston and St Saviour's. The cemetery was closed for general use in 1937 with over 30,000 interments there, though additional burials in existing graves continue. The majority of the cemetery was for about 29,500 burials from Walcot parish, with the north of the cemetery for Weston and St Saviour parishes.

Nowadays it is designated as a 'Nature Conservation Site' by Bath and North East Somerset council, its owners. The cemetery has several unusual species of tree including Phillyrea latifolia, Sequoiadendron giganteum, Ailanthus altissima, Thuja plicata and Japanese Cherry.

== Listed structures ==
There are five Grade II listed structures in the cemetery:

- Gothic entrance Lodge
- Main entrance gate piers and boundary walls
- Twin mortuary chapels (north chapel Church of England, south chapel non-conformist) with bell tower and linking arcade
- Bronze sarcophagus with angel by Edward Onslow Ford
- Cross of Sacrifice, amongst World War I graves

== Military graves ==
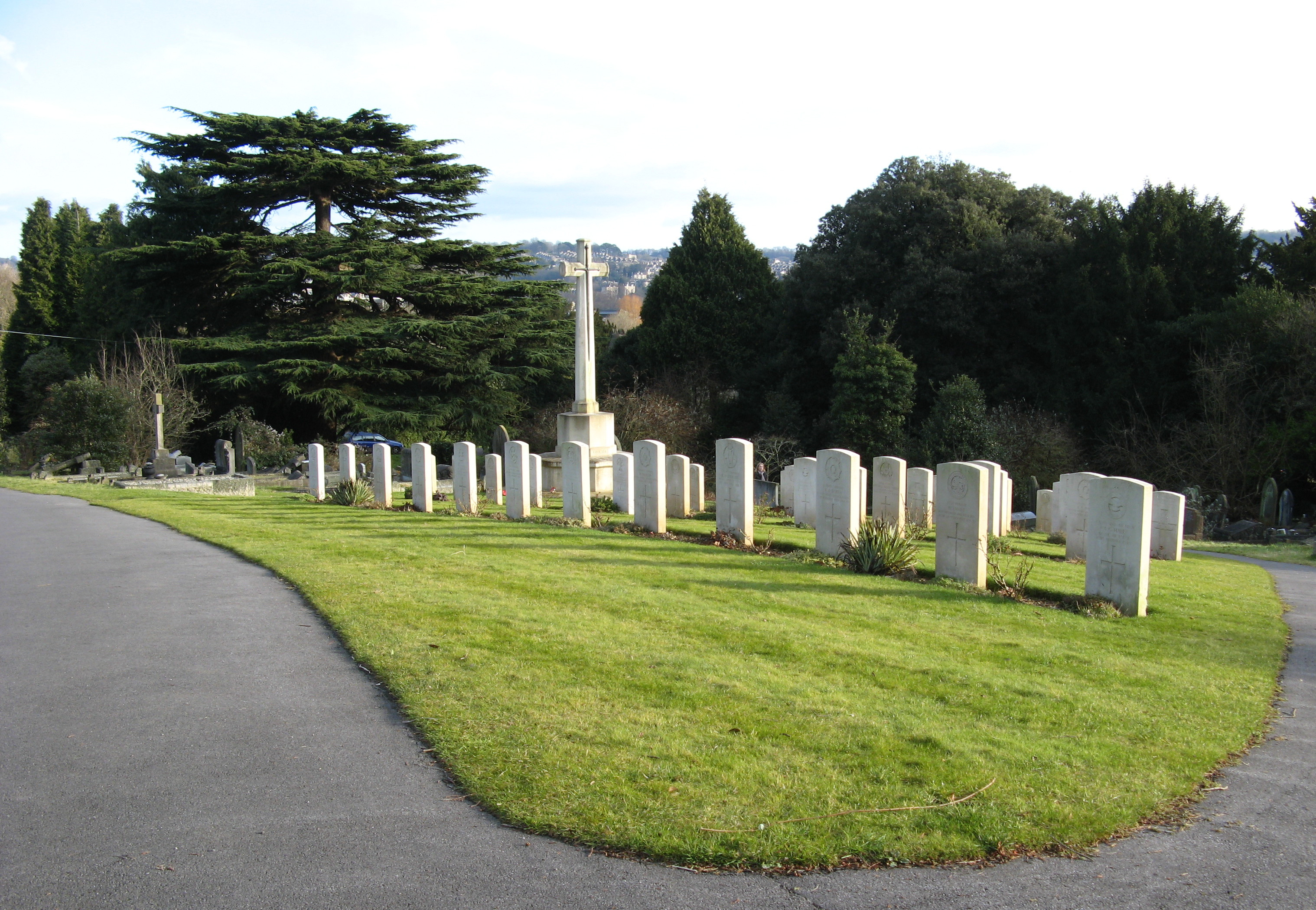
World War I graves at Locksbrook Cemetery

A total of 122 military graves in the cemetery are in the care of the Commonwealth War Graves Commission, 90 of which are from World War I, 44 forming a war graves plot (mainly hospital deaths, many from the nearby Bath War Hospital), and 32 from World War II whose graves are dispersed around the cemetery. Locksbrook Cemetery is the final resting place of the following Victoria Cross recipients:

- Herbert Taylor Reade
- George Alexander Renny
- William Francis Frederick Waller

== Gallery ==
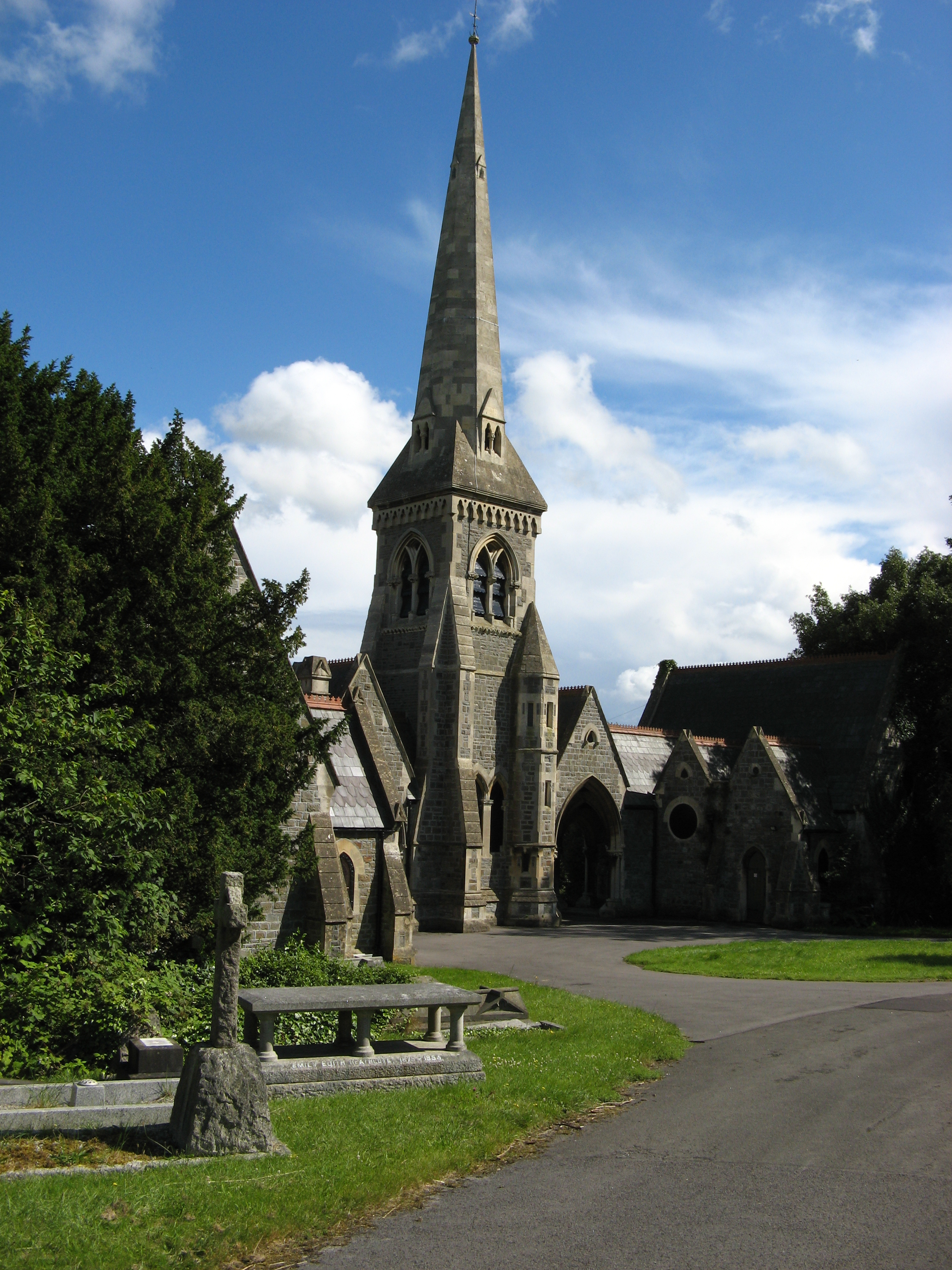
Cemetery twin chapels

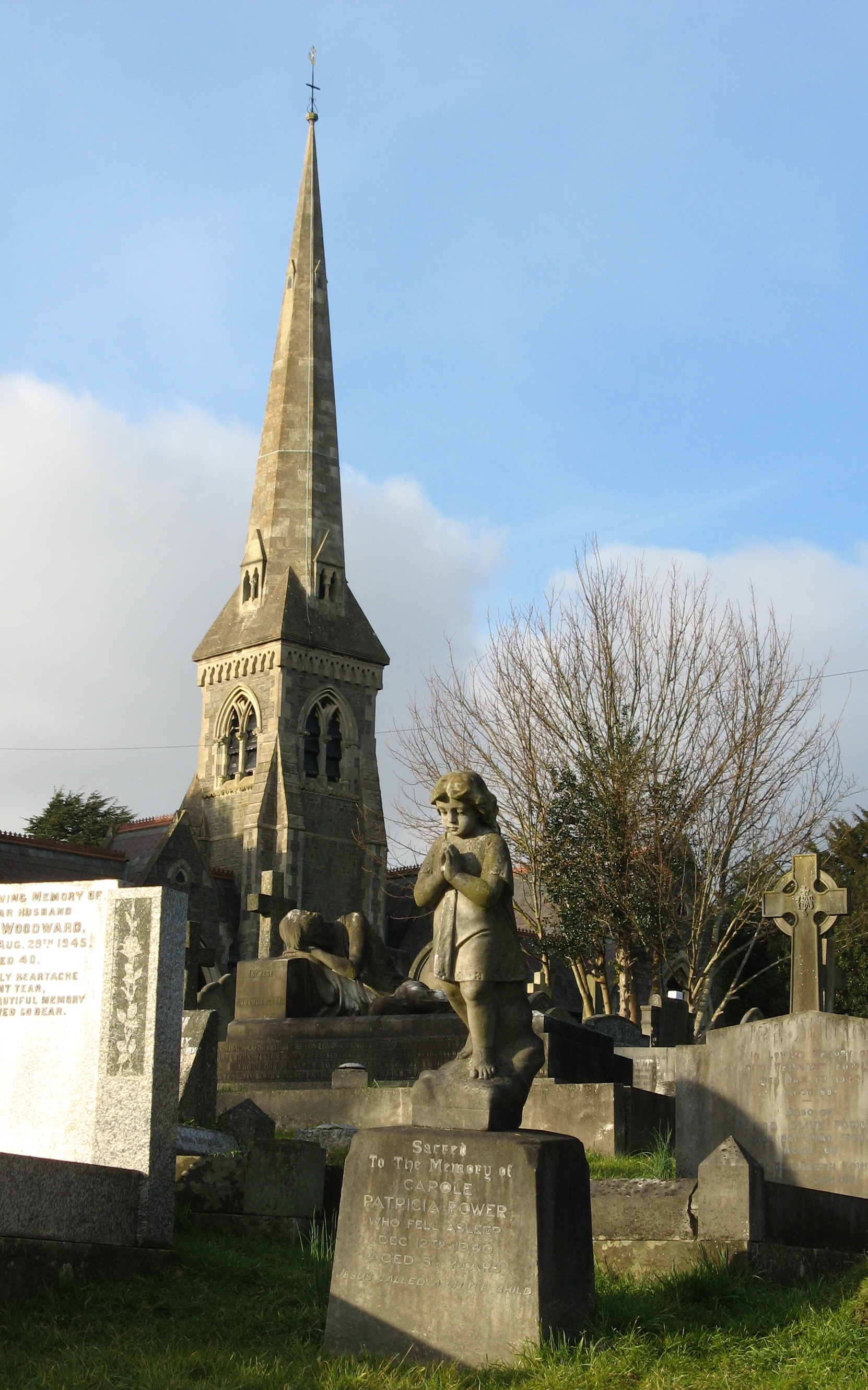
Graves with cemetery chapels in background

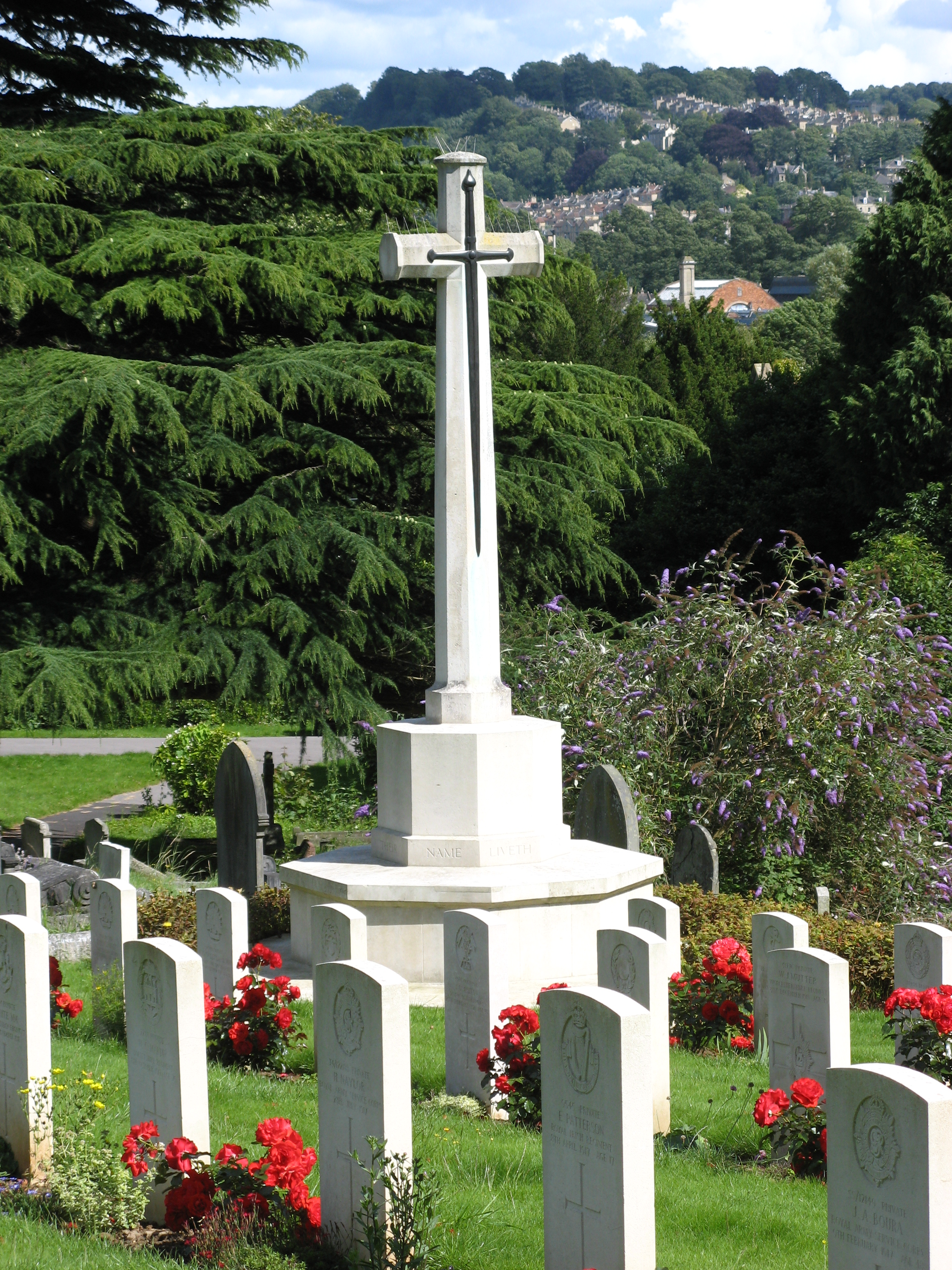
The Cross of Sacrifice is a Grade II listed structure, designed by Sir Reginald Blomfield circa 1922.

== See also ==
- Locksbrook
