= Albert Reed =

Albert Reed may refer to:

- Albert Reed (model) (born 1985), American model
- Albert Reed (cricketer) (1846–1931), English cricketer
- Albert Edwin Reed (1846–1920), founder of the publishers Reed Elsevier
- Albert Reed Jr. (1922–1986), American actor and law enforcement officer

== See also ==
- Bert Reed (born 1988), American football wide receiver
- Albert Reid (disambiguation)
- Albert Read (disambiguation)
