= Science Discovery Center of Oneonta =

Coordinates: 42.471647°N 75.061935°W

A.J. Read Science Discovery Center of Oneonta
- Established: 1990
- Location: 108 Ravine Parkway; Physical Sciences Building; Oneonta, New York, United States
- Type: Science museum
- Owner: SUNY Oneonta
- Website: suny.oneonta.edu/science-discovery-center

The A.J. Read Science Discovery Center of Oneonta (SDC) is a hands-on science museum that is a part of SUNY Oneonta in Oneonta, New York. The museum features a variety of hands-on science exhibits and activities across a range of scientific disciplines and is suitable for all ages and abilities. In addition to regular visitor hours, the center hosts school and other local groups for visits to the SDC and SUNY Planetarium.

It also sponsors special events in science education, such as Chemistry Week and Tropical Fruit Day, and it regularly provides family-friendly activities for major events such as Homecoming Weekend and the Otsego County Fair.

== History ==
The museum was the result of the hard work and dedication of Albert Read, a physics professor at SUNY Oneonta from 1957 to 1985. After his retirement, he planned and designed the center and housed it in a room formerly used for batting practice. The official dedication took place on January 21, 1990. From its opening in 1990, to the time of Read's retirement as director in 2005, the museum doubled the number of exhibits and served an estimated 7,000 visitors per year. The center is part of the Association of Science-Technology Centers (ASTC) and some of the exhibits developed by Read were included in the ASTC "Cheapbook" exhibit guide series.

Following Read's retirement, Dr. Hugh Gallagher served as director. In 2006, the center received a $100,000 state grant to expand its outreach to local elementary and secondary teachers, provide additional education resources for teachers and students, and improve the facility. "I'm thrilled that the College will have this tremendous opportunity to enhance such a valuable community resource," said Dr. Gallagher. "The unique collection of hands-on science exhibits offers people of all ages a way to touch and feel the physical sciences." The grant was used to re-decorate the center, develop new exhibits, and enhancing the interactivity of other exhibits.

The work of the center was described in a faculty research presentation "Science Discovery Center: A Resource for Curricular Enhancement for Many Disciplines" by Hugh Gallagher (Physics & Astronomy), Carolyn Chryst (Elementary Education & Reading), Jenny Flynn (SUNY Oneonta Headstart), Paul French (Physics &Astronomy), Kelly Gallagher (Chemistry & Biochemistry), Larry Guzy(Psychology), Crystal Hamm (SUNY Oneonta Headstart), Sunil Labroo, Carolyn McCruden, Albert Read (Physics & Astronomy), David Tagg (Music). Paul French served as director until September 2015.

In 2015, the center celebrated its 25th anniversary, and was renamed the "A.J. Read Science Discovery Center" in honor of the contributions of its founding director. At that time, the center had been temporarily moved from the Physical Science Building to the 3rd floor of Bugbee Hall.

In 2017, the center moved into a new space following the renovation of the Physical Sciences building.

Currently, the Science Discovery Center has one full-time Coordinator of Science Outreach Activities and employs part-time undergraduate and graduate student interns during the academic semesters.
