= Robert Reid (Scottish footballer) =

Scottish footballer

Personal information
- Place of birth: Scotland
- Position: Goalkeeper

Senior career*
Years	Team	Apps	(Gls)
1913–1916	Hibernian	14	(5)
1918	Hamilton Academical	1	(1)
- * Club domestic league appearances and goals

Robert Reid was a Scottish professional football forward who played in the Scottish League for Hibernian and Hamilton Academical.

== Personal life ==
Reid enlisted in the British Army during the First World War.

== Career statistics ==
Appearances and goals by club, season and competition
Club	Season	League			National Cup		Other		Total	
Club	Season	Division	Apps	Goals	Apps	Goals	Apps	Goals	Apps	Goals
Hibernian	1913–14	Scottish First Division	11	3	0	0	—		11	3
Hibernian	1914–15	Scottish First Division	2	2	—		—		2	2
Hibernian	1916–17	Scottish First Division	1	0	—		—		1	0
Hibernian	Total		14	5	0	0	—		14	5
Hamilton Academical (loan)	1917–18	Scottish First Division	1	1	—		1 (Note: Appearance in Lanarkshire Cup.)	2	2	3
Career total			15	6	0	0	1	2	16	8
