= John MacWhirter (physician) =

Scottish physician (1783–1854)

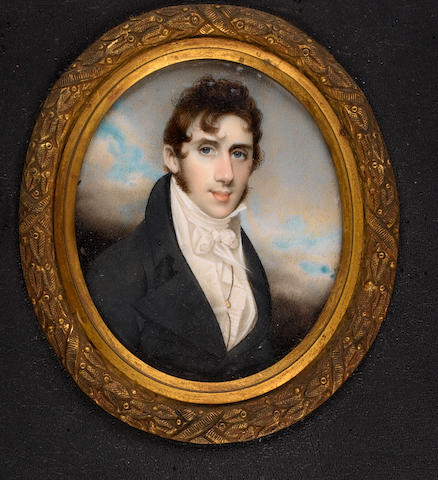
Painting of John MacWhirter by George Chinnery

Dr John MacWhirter FRSE PRCPE (1783–1854) was a 19th-century Scottish physician who served as president of the Royal College of Physicians of Edinburgh from 1831 to 1833.

== Life ==
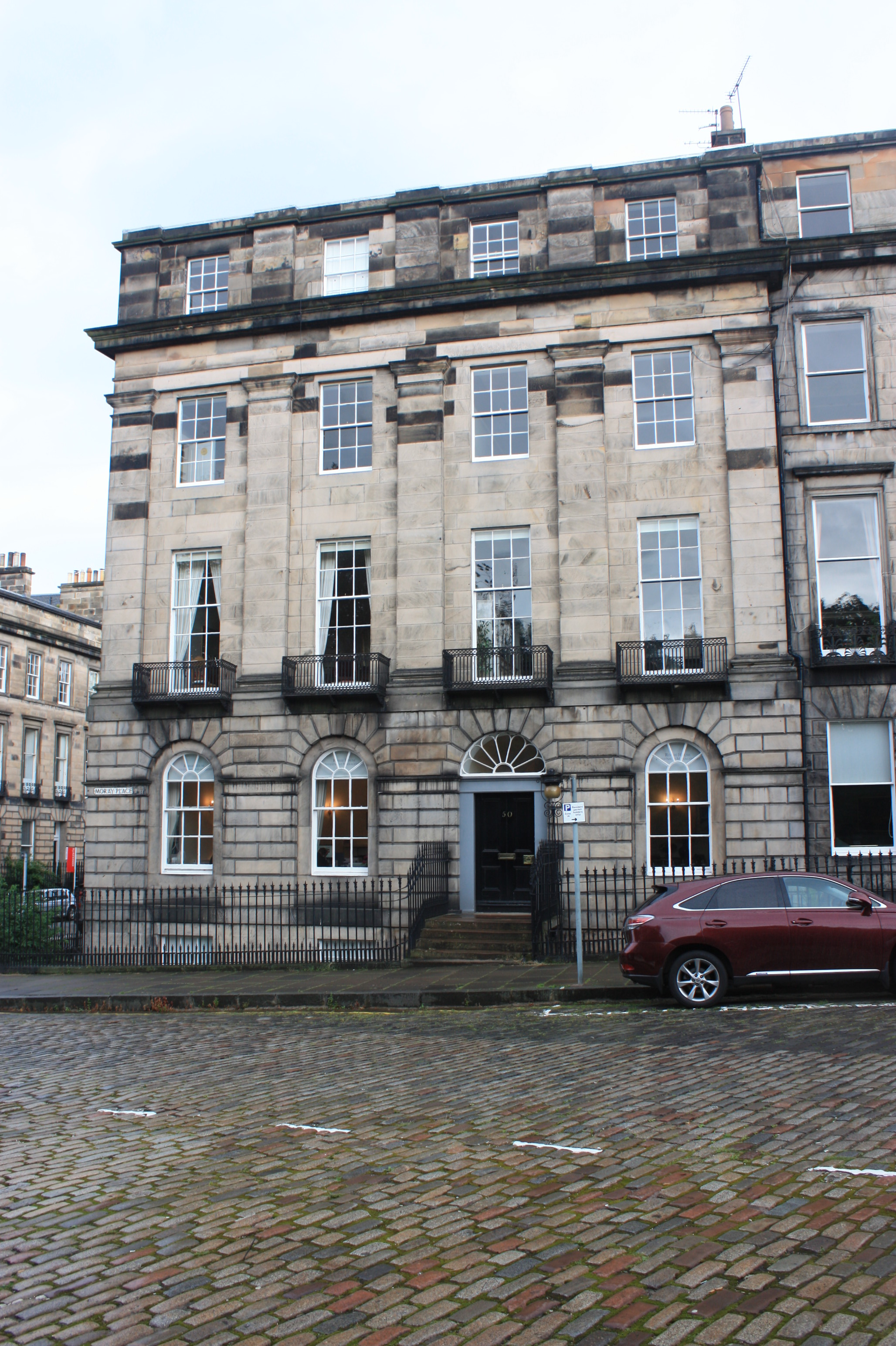
50 Moray Place, Edinburgh

Little is known of his early life other than he studied medicine at St Andrews University. He began working in the Indian Medical Service in 1803, attached to the East India Company, being promoted to full surgeon in 1815. He received his doctorate from St Andrew University in 1816 on his return to Scotland and set up practice as a GP in Edinburgh. In 1824 he was elected a Fellow of the Royal Society of Edinburgh his proposer being Thomas Allan. In 1824 MacWhirter was elected a member of the Harveian Society of Edinburgh and served as President in 1827. In 1826 he was elected a member of the Aesculapian Club.

At the time of his presidency he lived at 4 Ainslie Place in Edinburgh.

He died at home, 50 Moray Place in Edinburgh's affluent West End on 13 December 1854.

== Artistic recognition ==
He was painted by George Chinnery around 1820.

== Family ==
He married Harriet Ann Reid in Calcutta in 1810.
