= Modlin railway station =

Railway station in Nowy Dwór Mazowiecki, Poland

Coordinates: 52.4431°N 20.7036°E

Modlin
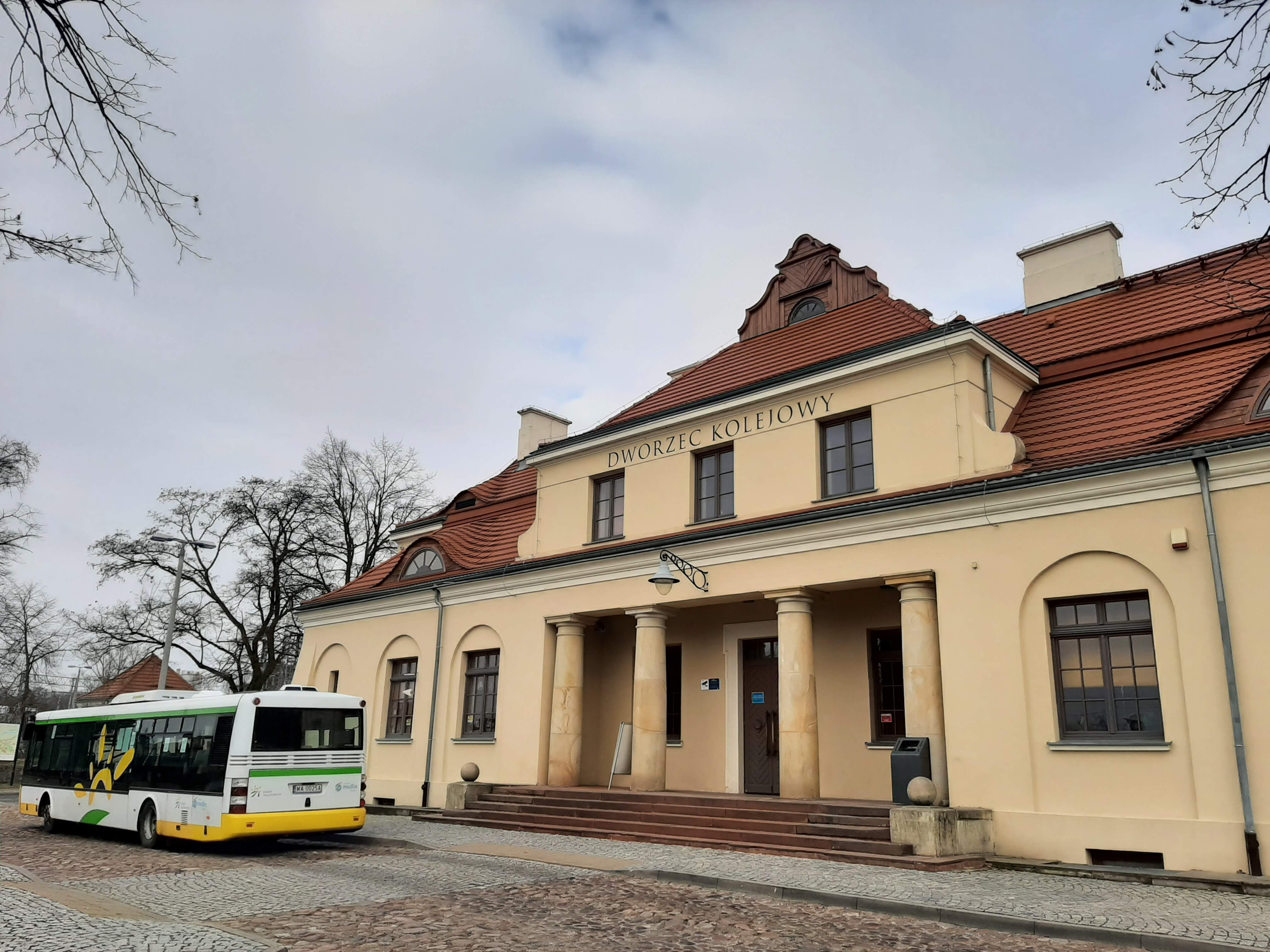
- Modlin railway station

General information
- Location: Nowy Dwór Mazowiecki, Masovian Voivodeship; Poland
- Owner: PKP Polskie Linie Kolejowe
- Line: Warsaw–Gdańsk
- Platforms: 3
- Tracks: 3

History
- Opened: 1877; 149 years ago
- Rebuilt: 2010–2011
Location
- Location within Poland

Modlin is a railway station serving the town of Nowy Dwór Mazowiecki, in the Masovian Voivodeship, Poland. The station opened in 1877 and is located on the Warsaw–Gdańsk railway. The train services are operated by Masovian Railways.

The station building features a ticket office and a Bed & Breakfast hotel.

During Congress Poland (Russian occupation) era, the station was known as Nowogeorgiewsk.

== Modernisation ==
The station was rebuilt between 2010 and 2011 as part of the modernisation of the Warsaw-Gdansk railway.

== Train services ==
The station is served by the following services:

- Intercity services Gdynia - Gdansk - Malbork - Warsaw - Katowice - Krakow
- Intercity services Olsztyn - Warsaw - Katowice - Krakow
- Regional services Dzialdowo - Mlawa - Ciechanow - Nasielsk - Modlin - Nowy Dwor Mazowiecki - Legionowo - Warsaw Gdanska - Warsaw West
- Regional services Sierpc - Plonsk - Nasielsk - Modlin - Nowy Dwor Mazowiecki - Legionowo - Warsaw Gdanska
- Regional services Modlin - Nowy Dwor Mazowiecki - Legionowo - Warsaw - Warsaw Chopin Airport

Preceding station	Masovian Railways	Following station
Nowy Dwór Mazowiecki towards Warszawa Zachodnia	R9	Pomiechówek towards Działdowo
Nowy Dwór Mazowiecki towards Warszawa Zachodnia	R90	Pomiechówek towards Działdowo
Nowy Dwór Mazowiecki towards Warszawa Zachodnia	RE9	Pomiechówek towards Działdowo
Nowy Dwór Mazowiecki towards Warszawa Zachodnia	RE90	Pomiechówek towards Działdowo
Nowy Dwór Mazowiecki towards Warszawa Gdańska	RE91	Nasielsk towards Sierpc
Nowy Dwór Mazowiecki towards Warsaw Chopin Airport	RL	Terminus

== Bus services ==
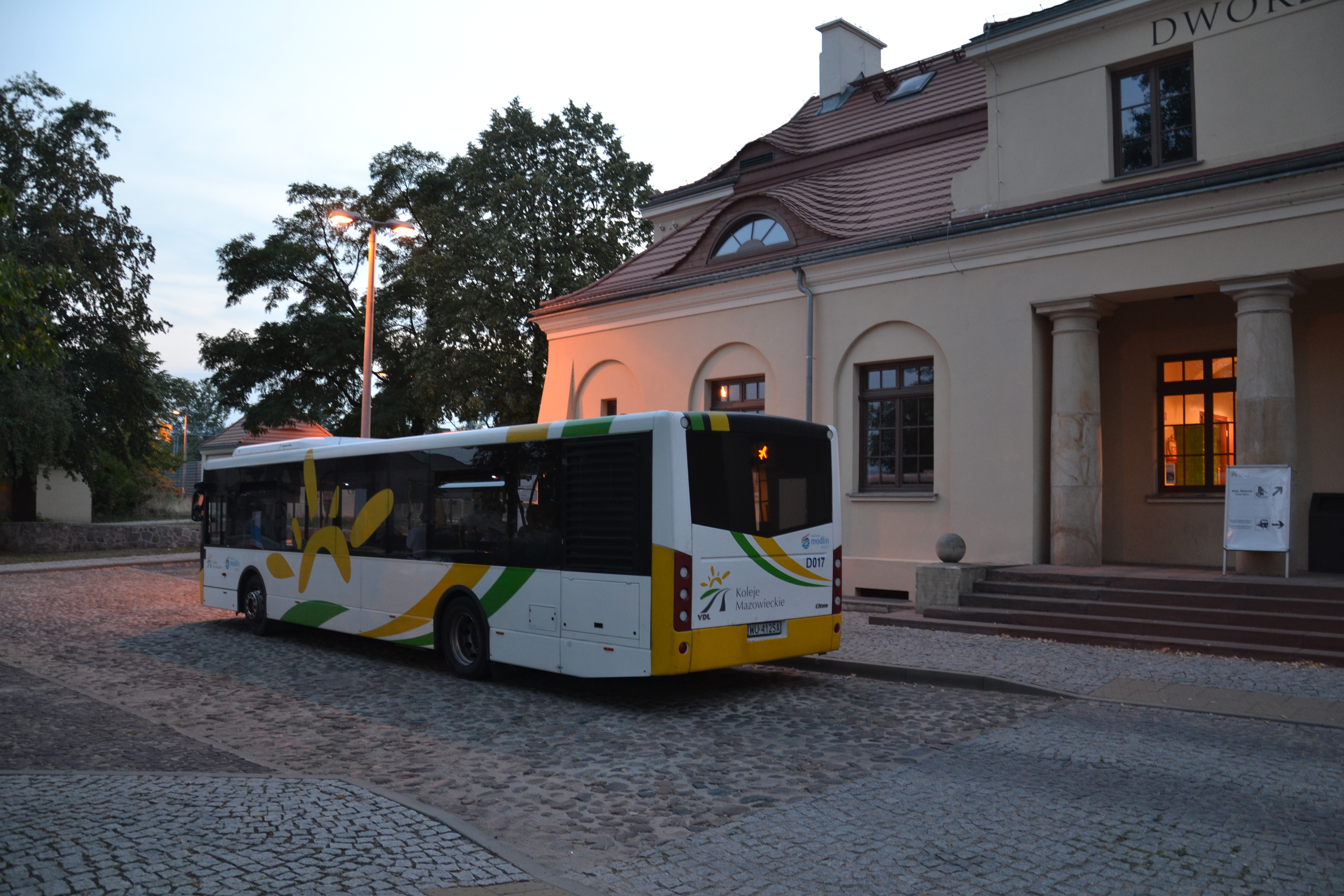
A bus for the airport waiting at the station

A shuttle bus service operates to Warsaw Modlin Airport from the station every 20 minutes.
