= Robert Read (cricketer) =

New Zealand cricketer

Personal information
- Born: 1870; London, England
- Died: 15 February 1945 (aged 74–75); Wellington, New Zealand
- Source: Cricinfo, 27 October 2020

Robert Read (1870 – 15 February 1945) was a New Zealand cricketer. He played in two first-class matches for Wellington from 1899 to 1901.

== See also ==
- List of Wellington representative cricketers
