= Herbert Taylor Reade =

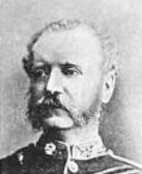
- Born: 20 September 1828; Perth, Ontario, Upper Canada
- Died: 23 June 1897 (aged 68); Bath, Somerset, England
- Burial place: Locksbrook Cemetery, Bath
- Military career
- Allegiance: United Kingdom
- Branch: British Army
- Service years: 1850–1887
- Rank: Surgeon General
- Units: 61st Regiment of Foot
- Conflicts: Indian Rebellion of 1857
- Awards: Victoria Cross; Companion of the Order of the Bath

Herbert Taylor Reade VC CB (20 September 1828 – 23 June 1897) was a Canadian-born recipient of the Victoria Cross, the highest and most prestigious British honour. The award was for gallantry in the face of the enemy.

== Early life ==
Herbert Taylor Reade was born in Perth, Upper Canada on 20 September 1828. He became a Doctor of Medicine in 1850, and joined the British Army as an Assistant Surgeon in November of that year.

== Victoria Cross ==
He was 28 years old, and a surgeon in the 61st Regiment (later The Gloucestershire Regiment), British Army during the Indian Rebellion of 1857 when the following deeds took place during the Siege of Delhi for which he was awarded the VC:

61st Regiment, Surgeon Herbert Taylor Reade

Date of Acts of Bravery, September 14th and 16th, 1857

During the siege of Delhi, on the 14th of September, 1857, while Surgeon Reade was attending to the wounded, at the end of one of the streets of the city, a party of rebels advanced from the direction of the Bank, and having established themselves in the houses in the street, commenced firing from the roofs. The wounded were thus in very great danger, and would have fallen into the hands of the enemy, had not Surgeon Reade drawn his sword, and calling upon the few soldiers who were near to follow, succeeded, under a very heavy fire, in dislodging the rebels from their position. Surgeon Reade's party consisted of about ten in all, of whom two were killed, and five or six wounded.

Surgeon Reade also accompanied the regiment at the assault of Delhi, and, on the morning of the 16th September, 1857, was one of the first up at the breach in the magazine, which was stormed by the 61st Regiment and Belooch Battalion, upon which occasion he, with a sergeant of the 61st Regiment, spiked one of the enemy's guns.

== Later life ==
He later achieved the rank of Surgeon General, and retired in 1887. After his military service, he served as a surgeon to Queen Victoria.

Reade is buried at Locksbrook Cemetery, Bath, Somerset, England. His headstone in located in section FJ, Grave 864. The headstone, in the form of a cross, has a carving of the Victoria Cross at the foot of the cross.

== Medal ==
His Victoria Cross is displayed at the Soldiers of Gloucestershire Museum. There is a replica of his Victoria Cross at Perth Museum, in Perth, Ontario, Canada.
