= Robert Reid (antiquarian) =

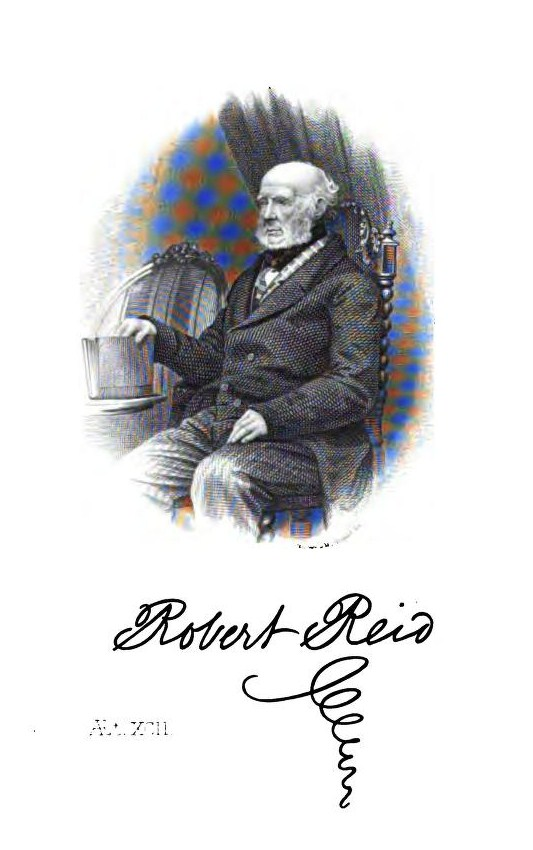
- Robert Reid, pseudonym "Senex"
- Born: 27 January 1773; Glasgow, Scotland
- Died: 7 June 1865 (aged 92); Cumbrae, Scotland

Robert Reid (1773–1865) was a Scottish businessman, topographer and antiquary.

== Life ==
The youngest son of John Reid, a mahogany dealer, cabinet-maker and builder in the Candleriggs district of Glasgow, he was born there on 27 January 1773, and was educated at Glasgow grammar school and the University of Glasgow. In 1793 he went into business as a muslin manufacturer, and in 1800 became a partner with his brother John as a wholesale mahogany dealer. On his brother's death he took over the business, adding to it that of cabinet-making and upholstery. His shop was at 93 Stockwell Street, east of St Enoch Square and his house was at Kingston Place.

In 1832 he sold off his stock-in-trade and retired from business.

During the last years of his life Reid resided at Strahoun Lodge on the island of Cumbrae, where he died on 7 June 1865.

== Works ==
Under the pseudonym "Senex", Reid contributed for many years articles on local memorabilia to the Glasgow Herald. They were later collected and published, as Glasgow Past and Present in three volumes: two volumes appeared in 1851 and the third in 1856. Reid's Glasgow and its Environs was issued in 1864, and both works, with additions by other writers, were reprinted in three volumes at Glasgow in 1884: the third volume, by Reid, contained a short autobiography. He was also author of Fragments regarding the Ancient History of the Hebrides, Glasgow, 1850.

== Family ==
Reid married, in 1809, a daughter of Robert Ewing, a merchant of London, and they had three sons. She died in 1826.
