= Bobby Reid (footballer, born 1955) =

Scottish footballer

Personal information
- Date of birth: 9 October 1955 (age 71)
- Place of birth: Scotland
- Position: Central defender

Youth career
- 1971–1973: Kilwinning Rangers

Senior career*
Years	Team	Apps	(Gls)
1973–1980	St Mirren	145	(22)

International career
1977	Scotland U21	3	(0)
- * Club domestic league appearances and goals

Bobby Reid (born 9 October 1955) is a Scottish former professional footballer who played as a central defender for St Mirren, making 145 appearances in the Scottish Football League between 1973 and 1980.
