= Bert Reed =

American gridiron football player (born 1988)

No. 19
- Position: Wide receiver

Personal information
- Born: June 1, 1988 (age 38); Panama City, Florida
- Listed height: 5 ft 10 in (1.78 m)
- Listed weight: 183 lb (83 kg)

Career information
- High school: Panama City (FL) Bay
- College: Florida State
- NFL draft: 2012: undrafted

Career history
- Cleveland Browns (2012)*; Tampa Bay Buccaneers (2012)*; Denver Broncos (2012)*; Pittsburgh Steelers (2012–2013)*; Jacksonville Sharks (2014); Winnipeg Blue Bombers (2014)*; Las Vegas Outlaws (2015)*
- * Offseason or practice squad member only
- Stats at Pro Football Reference

Bert Reed (born June 1, 1988) is an American former football wide receiver.

== College career ==
Reed played wide receiver for Florida State.

== Professional career ==
=== Cleveland Browns ===
Reed signed with the Cleveland Browns practice squad on May 9, 2012, but was cut on August 26.

=== Tampa Bay Buccaneers ===
He then signed with the Tampa Bay Buccaneers on September 3, but was released 2 days later.

=== Denver Broncos ===
Reed signed with the Denver Broncos on October 2, but was again released on the 9th.

=== Pittsburgh Steelers ===
Reed signed on the Pittsburgh Steelers practice squad on November 28. The Steelers released Reed from the practice squad on December 12, 2012.

=== Jacksonville Sharks ===
On June 2, 2014, Reed was signed by the Jacksonville Sharks of the Arena Football League (AFL).

=== Las Vegas Outlaws ===
On December 22, 2014, Reed was selected by the Las Vegas Outlaws in the 2014 Expansion Draft.
