= Działdowo railway station =

Railway station in Działdowo, Poland

Działdowo
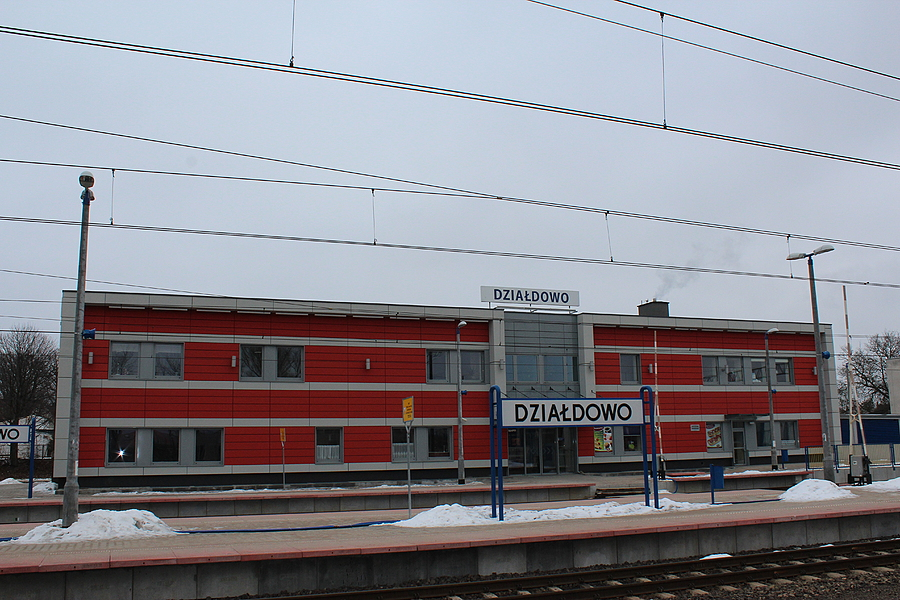
- Działdowo railway station

General information
- Location: Działdowo, Warmian-Masurian Voivodeship; Poland
- System: Railway Station
- Operator: PKP; Polregio; Masovian Railways
- Lines: 9: Warsaw–Gdańsk railway 208: Działdowo–Chojnice railway 216 Działdowo–Olsztyn railway
- Platforms: 5
- Tracks: 5

History
- Rebuilt: 2010-2014
Location
- Location within Poland

Działdowo railway station is a railway station serving the town of Działdowo, in the Warmian-Masurian Voivodeship, Poland. The station is located on the Warsaw–Gdańsk railway, Działdowo–Chojnice railway and Działdowo–Olsztyn railway. The train services are operated by PKP, Polregio and Masovian Railways.

== Modernisation ==
From 2010 until 2014 the station building and platforms were rebuilt. Also, as part of the modernisation the Local Control Centre in Dzialdowo, which includes a section of railway line No. 9 from Montowa to the border of the province. In November 2011, the station was opened to travellers, and adapted to the needs of people with disabilities.

== Train services ==
The station is served by the following service(s):

- Intercity services Gdynia - Gdansk - Malbork - Warsaw - Katowice - Krakow
- Intercity services (IC) Łódź Fabryczna — Warszawa — Gdańsk Glowny — Kołobrzeg
- Intercity services (IC) Olsztyn - Warszawa - Skierniewice - Łódź
- Intercity services (IC) Olsztyn - Warszawa - Skierniewice - Częstochowa - Katowice - Bielsko-Biała
- Intercity services (IC) Olsztyn - Warszawa - Skierniewice - Częstochowa - Katowice - Gliwice - Racibórz
- Intercity services (TLK) Gdynia Główna — Zakopane
- Intercity services (TLK) Kołobrzeg — Gdynia Główna — Warszawa Wschodnia — Kraków Główny
- Regional services (KM R90/RE90) Dzialdowo - Mlawa - Nasielsk - Modlin - Legionowo - Warsaw
- Regional services (R) Iława Główna — Działdowo

Preceding station	PKP Intercity	Following station
Mława towards Łódź Fabryczna	IC	Iława Główna towards Kołobrzeg
Mława towards Bielsko-Biała Główna or Racibórz	IC	Nidzica towards Olsztyn Główny
Mława towards Łódź Fabryczna	IC	Nidzica towards Olsztyn Główny
Iława Główna towards Kołobrzeg	IC	Mława towards Łódź Fabryczna
Iława Główna towards Gdynia Główna	TLK	Mława towards Zakopane
Iława Główna towards Kołobrzeg	TLK	Mława towards Kraków Główny
Preceding station	Polregio	Following station
Burkat towards Iława Główna	PR	Terminus
Krasnołąka towards Olsztyn Główny	PR	Terminus
Preceding station	Masovian Railways	Following station
Terminus	R90	Narzym towards Warszawa Zachodnia
Terminus	RE90	Narzym towards Warszawa Zachodnia
