= List of La Trobe University people =

This is an incomplete list of La Trobe University people, including alumni and staff.

== Alumni ==
=== Academia ===
- Lindsay Falvey – academic
- Sze Flett – scientist

=== Business ===
- Martyn Dunne – CEO of NZ Customs
- Ahmed Fahour – former CEO of National Australia Bank and Australia Post
- Jamila Gordon – former CIO of Qantas
- Stephen Hill – co-founder of Globe International
- David Morgan – Westpac CEO; former Treasury official; BHP Director
- Scott Pape – The Barefoot Investor
- Maureen Wheeler – founder of Lonely Planet

=== Government ===
==== Politicians ====
===== In Australia =====
- Jacinta Allan – state politician and minister
- David Baden-Powell – hereditary peer and scout leader
- Helen Buckingham – state politician
- Phil Cleary – former federal politician; author; social activist; political and sports commentator; former VFL footballer
- Jacinta Collins – Senator for Victoria
- Mary Delahunty – state politician; former minister; former ABC TV presenter
- Martin Dixon – state politician; opposition frontbencher
- Matthew Guy – state politician
- Sussan Ley – federal politician
- Gladys Liu – federal politician
- Andrew Robb – federal politician; Parliamentary secretary; former Liberal Treasurer
- Tony Sheehan – state politician and Treasurer; deputy opposition leader
- Sharman Stone – federal politician; former government minister
- Theo Theophanous – state politician and minister
- Christian Zahra – former federal politician

===== In other countries =====
- Abdirahman Farole – former President of Puntland
- Maximus Ongkili – Malaysian Cabinet Minister
- Abdul Ghani Othman – former Chief Minister of Johor, Malaysia
- Emília Pires – Finance Minister, East Timor
- Mahinda Samarasinghe – Sri Lankan cabinet minister of disaster management; MP
- Bisera Turkovic – Minister of Foreign Affairs, Bosnia and Herzegovina
- Lavu Sri Krishna Devarayalu – Member of Parliament in India state of Andhra Pradesh

==== Civil servants ====
- Mary Amiti – senior official at the Federal Reserve Bank of New York, formerly IMF and World Bank
- Stephen Duckett – former Secretary of Commonwealth Department of Human Services and Health (1994–1996); current President and Chief Executive Officer of Alberta Health Services in Canada
- Terry Moran – Head of the Department of Prime Minister and Cabinet; Head of the Federal Public Service
- Geoff Raby – Foreign Affairs secretary; Australia's most senior Trade official; World Trade Organization negotiator; Australian ambassador to China
- Ian Watt – Secretary of the Commonwealth Department of Finance; former Treasury and cabinet official; former diplomat
- Vinod Kumar Yadav – 1980 batch IRSEE officer and current Chairman of the Indian Railways Board

=== Humanities ===
==== Arts ====
- Dailan Evans – comedian (current student)
- Corinne Grant – TV personality, comedian, actor
- Pia Miranda – actress
- Bob Morley – actor, twice receiver of E! Online's Alpha Male Madness, ex-singer, star on The 100
- Rachel Peters – model, beauty queen (Miss Universe Philippines 2017)

==== Journalism and media ====
- Morag Fraser – academic, social commentator, journalist
- Jane Gazzo – BBC presenter
- Jennifer Keyte – journalist, TV news presenter
- Naomi Robson – journalist, presenter
- Tim Ross – TV and radio personality, comedian
- Virginia Trioli – ABC presenter, journalist, author, political commentator
- Geoff Walsh – former Australian Labor Party National Secretary; United Nations official and delegate; adviser to Prime Ministers Bob Hawke and Paul Keating; Consul General to Hong Kong; Age and Australian Financial Review journalist

==== Literature, writing and poetry ====
- Paul Jennings – children's author, speech pathologist and lecturer
- John Silvester – crime writer; The Age journalist
- Don Watson – author, academic, political commentator, former speechwriter for Paul Keating

=== Medicine and science ===
- Elaine Baker – marine science and environment researcher; Director of the University of Sydney Marine Studies Institute
- Bernadette Black (Bachelor of Nursing) - author and social policy campaigner
- Richard Di Natale (Master of Health Sciences, 2004; Master of Public Health, 2005) – GP, former leader of the Australian Greens
- Tim Entwisle (PhD in Botany 1987) – CEO and Director of the Royal Botanic Gardens Victoria
- Tim Flannery – biologist, author, and commentator on global warming; 2007 Australian of the Year
- Neil J. Gunther – Australian/American physicist and computer scientist
- Lynne Kelly – researcher and science educator
- Jim Thomas (BSc 1995) – zoologist; CEO and co-founder of Tenkile Conservation Alliance
- Phillip Toyne (1947–2015; Diploma of Education 1973) – expert in environmental law, founder of Landcare Australia

=== Sport ===
- Catherine Arlove – Olympian, judo
- Linda Beilharz – adventurer
- Samuel Beltz – Olympian, rowing
- Louisa Bisby - Former soccer player, Melbourne Victory/Matildas
- Andrew Demetriou – former Australian Football League CEO
- Warwick Draper – Olympic kayak competitor
- Lachlan Giles – grappler and Brazilian jiu-jitsu black belt competitor
- Brad Green – former Melbourne footballer; current Carlton development coach
- Kelsey Griffin - WNBL Player, Bendigo Spirit
- Brodie Grundy - AFL Player, Sydney Swans
- Mack Horton - Olympian, swimming
- Rachel Imison – Olympian, field hockey
- Joshua Katz (born 1997) – Olympian, judo
- Ahmed Kelly – Paralympian (current student)
- Tamsyn Manou – Olympic athlete, world champion
- Tim Matthews – Paralympian
- Bree Mellberg – wheelchair basketball player
- Angus Monfries – AFL player, Essendon (current student)
- Chris Mullins – Paralympian
- Bridget Murphy - Paralympian, equestrian
- Brooke Patterson - Former AFLW Player, Melbourne
- Mitch Podhajski - AFL Player, Collingwood
- Kliment Taseski - Former soccer player, Melbourne Heart/Australia U20
- Sophie Taylor - Field Hockey Player, Hockeyroos/Victorian Vipers

=== Other ===
- Rebecca Judd- model, television presenter
- Bill Kelty – former Australian Council of Trade Unions secretary; union official; AFL Commissioner
- Brian Loughnane – Federal Director of the Liberal Party of Australia

== Administration ==
=== Chancellors ===
Order	Chancellor	Term start	Term end	Time in office	Notes
1	Sir Archibald Glenn OBE	8 March 1967	1972	4–5 years	
2	Reginald Smithers	1972	1980	7–8 years	
3	Richard McGarvie	1981	1992	10–11 years	
4	Nancy Millis AC, MBE	1992	31 March 2006	13–14 years	
5	Sylvia Walton AO	1 April 2006	25 February 2011	4 years, 330 days	
6	Adrienne Clarke AC	26 February 2011	25 February 2017	5 years, 365 days	
7	Richard Larkins AO	26 February 2017	28 March 2019	2 years, 30 days	
8	John Brumby AO	29 March 2019	incumbent	7 years, 222 days	

=== Vice-Chancellors ===
Order	Vice-Chancellor	Term start	Term end	Time in office	Notes
1	David Myers AO	1965	1976	10–11 years	
2	John Scott	1976	1989	11–12 years	
3	Michael Osborne	1990	2005	14–15 years	
4	Brian Stoddart	2006	2006	0 years	
5	Roger Parish (acting)	2007	2007	0 years	
6	Paul Johnson	2007	31 December 2011	3–4 years	
7	John Dewar	16 January 2012	incumbent	14 years, 294 days	

== Faculty ==
=== Current ===
==== Politics ====
- Dennis Altman – academic; expert on the politics of gender
- Nick Bisley – professor of politics and international relations; frequently contributes to the media and public debates
- Judith Brett – academic in the field of politics; author of several books on Australian politics
- Joseph Camilleri – academic in the field of international relations and director of the Centre for Dialogue
- Robert Manne – academic; public intellectuals; author of books on Australian politics and society

==== Sociology and anthropology ====
- Peter Beilharz – public intellectual
- John Carroll – academic in the field of sociology; public intellectual

==== Economics and finance ====
- Don Brash – former Governor of the Reserve Bank of New Zealand; former New Zealand Opposition Leader
- Joanna Poyago-Theotoky – professor of economics

==== Philosophy ====
- Agnes Heller – philosopher
- Frank Cameron Jackson – philosopher

==== English ====
- David Tacey – literature academic

==== History ====
- Richard Broome – Aboriginal historian
- Quinn Eades – historian
- John Hirst – historian and commentator
- Katie Holmes – historian
- Marilyn Lake – social historian
- Yves Rees – historian

==== Archaeology ====
- David Frankel – archaeologist, known for work on sites in Cyprus
- Peter Mathews – archaeologist, known for work on Mayan hieroglyphs
- Tim Murray – archaeologist, Dean of faculty of Humanities and Social Sciences

==== Cinema and media studies ====
- John Flaus – film academic and actor
- Terrie Waddell – film academic and actress

==== Linguistics ====
- David Bradley – linguist

==== Science ====
- Michael Clarke – zoologist
- Erinna Lee – biochemistry researcher
- Ádám Mechler – materials scientist
- Bree Mellberg – biochemistry researcher, wheelchair basketball player
- Roger Parish – botanist
- Pamela Claire Snow – educational psychologist and speech pathologist

=== Past ===
- Graeme Clark – key figure in the research and development of the cochlear implant
- Inga Clendinnen
- Peter Cochrane – historian and author
- Burkhard Dallwitz – composer, Golden Globe winner
- Edward Duyker – historian and author
- Elizabeth Essex-Cohen – physicist
- Alan Frost – historian
- Petro Georgiou – Federal Liberal MP
- Gerard Henderson
- Daryl E. Hooper – inaugural professor in engineering
- Rhys Isaac – Pulitzer Prize winner
- Robert Lovell Reid – professor of agriculture 1968 to 1979 after whom the R L Reid Building is named
- Andrew Robb – current Federal Liberal MP; former Liberal Party treasurer
- J. J. C. Smart – philosopher

==== Administrative ====
- Fran Kelly – journalist, ABC presenter
