= Reginald Smithers =

Australian judge

Sir Reginald Allfree Smithers, QC (born 1903 in Echuca, Victoria – died January 1994) was an Australian lawyer and judge. Smithers educated at Melbourne Grammar School. Admitted to the Bar in 1929, he was appointed a King's Counsel in 1951. was a judge of the Federal Court of Australia from 1 February 1977 to 30 September 1986. Smithers was the Chancellor of La Trobe University from 1972 to 1980. He was knighted in the 1980 New Year Honours for service to law.
