= Joseph Camilleri =

Australian citizen of Maltese descent

- Born: 1944; Egypt
- Occupation: Philosophy

Joseph Camilleri (born 1944) is an Australian citizen of Maltese descent. He is a social scientist and philosopher. In philosophy he mostly specialised and interested in international relations.

== Life ==
Camilleri was born in 1944 into a Maltese family residing in Egypt. His family moved to Australia when he was still very young. He studied at Melbourne University, Australia, from where he acquired his Bachelor of Arts, at Monash University, also in Melbourne, from where he acquire his Masters' degree, and at London University, England, where he became Doctor of Philosophy. Between 1967 and 1968 Camilleri was Teaching Fellow at Monash University. Subsequently, he was Noel Buxton Fellow at the London School of Economics (1969–72), and Senior Teaching Fellow in Politics at Monash University (1969–72). Then, at La Trobe University in Victoria, Australia, he was Lecturer (1973–80), Senior Lecturer (1981–87), and Reader (1988–93), all in Politics. As Professor of International Relations, he currently holds Personal Chair in Politics in the School of Social Sciences at La Trobe University. He is also the Director of the Centre for Dialogue, also at La Trobe. He has taught over thirty different subjects at undergraduate and postgraduate level in the following areas ranging from theories of world politics, conflict analysis and peace research to nuclear weapons in international relations, oil and the politics of the Middle East, and the foreign policies of the United States, China, Russia, France, Japan, and Australia. His many research projects include governance and the development of multilateral regional and global institutions. Since 1995 he has been a Member of the Australian Committee of the Council for Security and Cooperation in Asia Pacific (AUS CSCAP). He is also Member of the Advisory Board of the Scholarly Journal Global Governance (since 1997), and a Member of the Advisory Council of the Toda Institute for Peace and Global Policy Research (since 1998).

== Works ==
Camilleri has published widely. The following is a select list of publications:

Books

- 1973 – Security and Survival: The New Era in International Relations.
- 1973 – In Introduction to Australian Foreign Policy.
- 1976 – Civilization in Crisis: Human Prospects in a Changing World.
- 1980 – Chinese Foreign Policy: The Maoist Era and its Aftermath.
- 1980 – Australian-American Relations: The Web of Dependence.
- 1984 – The State and Nuclear Power: Conflict and Control in the Western World.
- 1987 – The Australia-New Zealand-U.S. Alliance: Regional Security in the Nuclear Age.
- 1989 – New Economic Directions for Australia.
- 1992 – The End of Sovereignty? The Politics of a Shrinking and Fragmenting World.
- 1995 – The State in Transition: Reimagining Political Space (co-editor).
- 1998 – Globalization: The Perspectives and Experiences of the Religious Traditions of Asia Pacific (co-editor)
- 2000 – Reimagining the Future: Towards Democratic Governance.
- 2000 – States, Markets and Civil Society in Asia Pacific, The Political Economy of Asia Pacific, Volume 1.
- 2001 – Religion and Culture in Asia Pacific: Violence or Healing? (editor).
- 2002 – Democratizing Global Governance (co-editor).
- 2003 – Regionalism in the New Asia-Pacific Order: the Political Economy of Asia Pacific, Volume 2.
- 2007 – Asia-Pacific Geopolitics: Hegemony vs. Human Security (co-editor).

Chapters in books

- 1993 – "Alliances and Emerging Post-Cold War Security System," in Charting the Post-Cold War Order, ed. by Richard Leaver and James L. Richardson.
- 1995 – "Asia-Pacific Multilateralism: Australian Perspectives and Priorities," in Towards an Era of Cooperation, ed. by Dipankar Banerjee.
- 1995 – "Mantenimiento de la paz, pacificacion de crisis despues de la Guerra Fria," in La Naciones Unidas a los cincuenta anos, ed. by Modesto Seara Vazquez.
- 1995 – "The Cold War ... and After: A New Period of Upheaval in World Politics," in Why the Cold War Ended, ed. by Ralph Summy and Michael Salla.
- 1995 – "The Asia-Pacific in the Post Hegemonic World," in Pacific Co-operation: Building Economic and Security Regimes in the Asia-Pacific Region, edited by Andrew Mack and John Ravenhill, Boulder, Co.: Westview Press, 1995, pp. 180–207.
- 1995 – "State, Economy and Civil Society," in The State in Transition: Reimagining Political Space, ed. by A. P. Jarvis, and A. P. Paolini.
- 1996 – "Impoverishment and the Nation State," in Earthly Goods: Environmental Change and Social Justice, ed. by Fen Osler Hampson and Judith Reppy.
- 1997 – "ASEAN's Unique Contribution to Regional Security," in The ASEAN: Thirty Years and Beyond, ed. by Maria Lourdes Aranal-Sereno and Joseph Sedfrey Santiago.
- 1997 – "The Pacific House: The Emerging Architecture for Comprehensive Security," in No Better Alternative: Towards Comprehensive and Cooperative Security in the Asia-Pacific, ed. by David Dickens.
- 1998 – "Globalisation and the New Internationalism," in Globalization: The Perspectives and Experiences of the Religious Traditions of Asia Pacific, ed. by Joseph A. Camilleri and Chandra Muzaffar.
- 1998 – "The UN's Place in the Era of Globalization: A Four Dimensional Perspective," in Between Sovereignty and Global Governance: The State, Civil Society, and the United Nations, ed. by A.J. Paolini, A.P. Jarvis and C. Reus-Smit.
- 1999 – "The Multilateral Dimensions of Australia's Security Policy," in Maintaining the Strategic Edge: The Defence of Australia, ed. by Des Ball.
- 1999 – "Regionalism and Globalism in Asia Pacific: The Interplay of Economy, Security and Politics," in Asian Peace: Security and Governance in the Asia-Pacific, ed. by Majid Tehranian.
- 2000 – "The Security Dilemma Revisited: Implications for Asia Pacific," in Asia's Emerging Regional Order: Reconciling Traditional and Human Security, ed. by W. Tow, R.Thakur and In-Taek Hyan.
- 2003 – "Globalization of Insecurity: The Democratic Imperative," in The Future of Peace in the Twenty-First Century, ed. by Nicholas N. Kittrie, Rodrigo Carazo and James R. Mancham.
- 2002 – "Peace Operations: the Road Ahead," in Democratizing Global Governance, ed. by Joseph Camilleri and Eşref Aksu.
- 2002 – "Rethinking the Structures of Global Governance," in Democratizing Global Governance, ed. by Joseph Camilleri and Eşref Aksu.
- 2002 – "The Politics of Reform," in Democratizing Global Governance, ed. by Joseph Camilleri and Eşref Aksu.
- 2004 – "WTO: The Competitive Dynamic of Globalization at Work" (with George Myconos), in Balancing Act: Law, Policy and Politics in Globalization and Global Trade, ed. by Jianfu Chen and Gordon Walker.
- 2007 – "Between Alliance and Regional Engagement: Current realities and future possibilities," in Asia-Pacific Geopolitics: Hegemony vs. Human Security, ed. by Joseph Camilleri, L. Marshall, M.S. Michael and M.T. Seigel.
- 2008 – "Sovereignty Discourse and Practice – Past and Future," in Re-envisioning Sovereignty the End of Westphalia?, ed. by Trudy Jacobsen, Charles Sampford and Ramesh Thakur.
- 2008 – "The Competition for Power and Legitimacy in an Age of Transition," in Challenges to Global Security, ed. by Hussein Solomon.
- 2008 – "The 'War on Terror': Reassessing its Rationale and Efficacy," in The 'Global War on Terror' and the Question of World Order, ed. by Hans Köchler.

Articles

- 1976 – "Dependence and the Politics of Disorder," Arena.
- 1977 – "The Myth of the Peaceful Atom," Millenium: Journal of International Studies.
- 1981 – "The Advanced Capitalist State and the Contemporary World Crisis," Science and Society.
- 1986 – "After Social Democracy," Arena.
- 1988 – "Les strategies armees de la paix," Vivant Univers.
- 1991 – "Problems in Australian Foreign Policy: January–June 1991," Australian Journal of Politics and History.
- 1991 – "Problems in Australian Foreign Policy: July–December 1990," Australian Journal of Politics and History.
- 1994 – "Security: Old Dilemmas and New Challenges in the Post-Cold War Environment," GeoJournal.
- 1994 – "Human Rights, Cultural Diversity and Conflict Resolution: The Asia-Pacific Context," Pacifica Review.
- 1998 – "Regional Human Rights Dialogue in Asia Pacific; Prospects and Proposals," Pacifica Review: Peace Security and Global Change.
- 2001 – "Globalization of Insecurity: The Democratic Imperative," International Journal on World Peace.
- 2002 – "Terrorism, the 'War on Terror' and the Globalisation of Insecurity," Arena Journal.
- 2003 – "A Leap into the Past – in the Name of the National Interest," Australian Journal of International Affairs.
