= Kate Holmes =

Kate Holmes or Katie Holmes may refer to:

- Katie Holmes, American actress
- Katie Holmes (historian)
- Kate Holmes, British keyboarder and head of the band Client known as Client A
- Kate Holmes, one of pen names of the American writer Anne Holmberg
