= Catherine Day =

Catherine Day may refer to:

- Catherine Day (civil servant) (born 1954), former European civil servant from Ireland
- Catherine Day (biochemist), New Zealand academic

== See also ==
- Saint Catherine's Day, Estonian holiday
