= Menzies College =

Menzies College is the name of:

- Menzies College, La Trobe University, Bundoora, Victoria, Australia, a residential college for undergraduate students at La Trobe University
- Menzies College, New Zealand, a secondary school in Wyndham
