= Glenn College, La Trobe University =

Glenn College
- La Trobe University
- Glenn College coat of arms
- Location: Melbourne Campus
- Coordinates: 37.720449°S 145.052076°E
- Full name: Glenn College
- Motto in English: 'Learning to live, living to learn'
- Established: 1967
- Named for: Sir Archibald Glenn

Glenn College is an Australian secular residential college located on the grounds of La Trobe University's principal campus in Melbourne, Victoria. Founded in 1967, it is the first and oldest residential college at the university. The college is named after the founding chancellor of La Trobe University, Sir Archibald Glenn.

There are up to 344 students residing at Glenn College with the majority of residents being undergraduates. Residents of the college are known as "Glennies".

== History ==
The construction of Glenn College finished in early 1967 in preparation for the university's first students that would enrol in March that year. Due to the fragility of the 'college concept' that its founders espoused, Glenn College came to be the first and last college of the university that had entirely met the original intentions of the Colleges Committee.

In the early years, the college served as a central part of university life. (Note: The College served as temporary 'office space for academic and administrative staff.') The council of the university held its first meeting on 19 December 1966 in the council room of Glenn College, where Sir Archibald Glenn, who the college had already been named after, was elected as chancellor. On the evening of 8 March 1967, the day on which the university was officially opened, the council held an inaugural ball at Glenn College. (Note: 'A dedicated and active member of the Council and the original planning committee, Mrs Ethleen King, has described the scene: It was a clear and balmy night. During the course of the evening a group of us, including the Chancellor and his wife, strolled over to the Library. From the top of the Library steps we saw in the distance the lights of Melbourne. We viewed close at hand Glenn College, shining with light, pulsating with music. There was indeed a sound of revelry by night, but it was not the eve of a battle. It was a happy and joyous night, celebrating the birth of a university. We rejoiced that our child, after two years and nine months of gestation and hard labour, had really come alive.')

== Culture and academic life ==
=== Heraldry ===
Coat of arms of Sir Archibald Glenn

The design of the coat of arms is an amalgamation of the La Trobe University coat of arms and the armorial bearings of the family of Sir Archibald Glenn, first chancellor of the university.

The official description of the Glenn College armorial bearings is as follows: Gyronny of eight Sable and Gules a Mullet of eight points voided and encircled by eight Escallops flukes inward Argent and for the Crest upon a Helm with a Wreath Argent and Gules A White-breasted Sea-Eagle wings elevated and addorsed proper grasping in the dexter talons from underneath an Escallop Argent Mantled Gules doubled Argent.

The college motto, "Learning to live, Living to learn", is inscribed on the scroll beneath the shield. This motto was chosen by the college's general committee as it encompasses the academic, social and cultural values upon which the college ethos is built.

=== Sports ===
Each year, Glenn College competes in the Chancellor's Trophy with the other La Trobe University Melbourne colleges - Menzies College and Chisholm College (whose side also consists of residents from Barnes way, Graduate House and University Lodge).

The intercollegiate sports are held throughout the university year and include cricket, hockey, swimming, tennis, Australian rules football, softball, baseball, badminton, netball, touch football, squash, volleyball, basketball, table tennis, billiards and the Ring Road Relay.

== Wardens ==
=== Heads of College ===
- Ben Meredith, 1967–1970
- D. Elwyn Davies, 1970 (acting head)
- John G. Jenkin, 1970–1971
- Stan Oates, 1971–1980
- Richard Luke, 1980-19--
