= Centre for Dialogue =

The Centre for Dialogue
- Established: 2006
- Affiliation: La Trobe University
- Director: Joseph A. Camiller
- Location: Melbourne, Australia
- Campus: Bundoora Campus
- Website: Official website

The Centre for Dialogue is an interdisciplinary research institution at La Trobe University. Joseph Camilleri was the director of the centre from 2006 until 2013. The current director is Alberto Gomes. The research centre specialises in the philosophy, method and practice of dialogue between communities, cultures, religions and civilisations. The key aims of the centre include:

- Educational projects designed to promote inter-cultural/inter-civilisational dialogue in schools and universities
- Research that addresses the challenges and opportunities presented by cultural, religious and political diversity and conflict
- Policy advice to governmental bodies, international agencies and non-governmental organisations
- Events, such as public forums, conferences, workshops, professional development days, courses, seminars consultations and media events
- Publications, such as working papers, books, articles, reports and media comment.

== Projects of the centre ==
The focus of the centre is largely concentrated on inter-cultural, inter-religious conflict and inter-civilisational conflict, as well as the researching of practical methods of dialogue which may encourage peaceful resolutions to conflict and mechanisms for cooperation.

The Centre for Dialogue has several current ongoing projects which act as the hallmark of the institutions' study.

Examples of such ongoing projects are investigating the tensions relations to the role of religion and culture in international politics, particularly since the 11 September terrorist attacks. Such projects continue to focus on how the government, nongovernment and civil society sectors have responded, most notable in Europe, the United States, and Asia (including Australia). The projects investigate both domestic conflict (for example, strategies to curb escalating tensions between Muslims and non-Muslims) and international tensions (for example, the implications arising from the rise of Political Islam and the war on terror in international politics).

Other projects include:

- The Education Dialogue Project, which has investigated ways that dialogue can enhance intercultural awareness and understanding in Victorian schools.
- The Dialogue Diaspora Project, which explores the nature of tensions between ethno-nationalist diasporic communities in Australia whose homelands are in conflict (for example, the Sri Lankan, Iraqi and Cypriot communities). The project examines the formation and transformation of such conflicts in Australia and explores practical dialogical methods to reduce their impact.
- The Northern Interfaith Network, which is developing a network of initiatives in Melbourne's culturally-diverse northern suburbs with five municipalities and seven organisations. It aims to provide government agencies (federal and state), religious and ethnic groups and community organisations with tested guidelines to facilitate community based dialogue initiatives.

The Centre for Dialogue also runs several educational programmes such as the Muslim Leadership Program for Young Muslims, which aims to empower young Muslim men and women and help them to reach their full potential as citizens and future leaders.

== Publications ==
The Centre for Dialogue composes and distributes publications arising from their diverse research projects. This includes the publication of books, edited volumes and journal articles, as well as discussion papers that are distributed to relevant organisations and government departments. The centre also distributes a bi-annual newsletter that reports on the centre's activities, as well as includes opinion pieces on issues that relate to the centre's interests.

The Centre for Dialogue also distributes several working papers each year that do not necessarily relate to the centre's projects. Monographs are submitted to the centre to be considered by the editorial committee for publication. The intention of the working papers is to provide the research community (including students and academics), policy-makers, journalists and community leaders with an opportunity to contribute to ongoing debates. Papers are preferred to focus on the dynamics of conflict (whether intrastate, inter-state, or trans-state). They generally must also identify ways in which the theory and/or practice of dialogue has contributed to coexistence, co-operation and mutual enrichment and highlight methods that may foster peaceful relations in the future.

The Centre for Dialogue and its staff provide the core of the editorial input of the scholarly journal, Global Change, Peace & Security, published by Routledge and edited from La Trobe University.

The previous director Joseph Camilleri's most recent book, co-authored with Jim Falk, was launched by UNDP head, the Hon Helen Clark, in Sydney, Australia in February 2010. The book Worlds in Transition: Evolving Governance Across a Stressed Planet, Edward Elgar, UK, is a synoptic overview of the way in which humans have come to collectively seek to shape their futures, and the challenges posed to that in a time of rapid transition.

The Centre for Dialogue hosts one major national or international conference and one major public lecture each year, such as an international conference titled "Europe and Asia: Between Islam and the United States" in 2008, and a 2009 controversial keynote address by former Iranian President Mohammad Khatami.

== See also ==
- Intercultural communication
- Intercultural dialogue
- Intergroup dialogue
- Interfaith dialogue
- La Trobe University
- List of La Trobe University people
