= Roger Parish =

Australian botanist

Roger Parish is an Emeritus Professor of Botany at La Trobe University, Melbourne, Australia.

== Publications ==
- MYB-bHLH-TTG1 in a Multi-tiered Pathway Regulates Arabidopsis Seed Coat Mucilage Biosynthesis Genes Including PECTIN METHYLESTERASE INHIBITOR14 Required for Homogalacturonan Demethylesterification. Plant and Cell Physiology, 64: 906–919 (2023)
- The Arabidopsis MYB5 transcription factor interacts with CASEIN KINASE2 BETA3 subunit in a yeast two-hybrid system. microPublication Biology, 2021:1-5. (2021)
- Differential responses of anthers of stress tolerant and sensitive wheat cultivars to high temperature stress. Planta, 254(1). (2021)
- MYB-bHLH-TTG1 regulates Arabidopsis seed coat biosynthesis pathways directly and indirectly via multiple tiers of transcription factors. Plant and Cell Physiology, 61(5):1005-1018. (2020)
- Anther Morphological Development and Stage Determination in Triticum aestivum. Frontiers Plant Sci., 9:1-13. (2018)
- Layers of regulation – Insights into the role of transcription factors controlling mucilage production in the Arabidopsis seed coat. Plant Science, 272:179-192. (2018)
- Regulation of gene expression by manipulating transcriptional repressor activity using a novel CoSRI technology. Plant Biotech. J., 15(7):879-893. (2017).
- The Arabidopsis GASA10 gene encodes a cell wall protein strongly expressed in developing anthers and seeds. Plant Science, 260:71-79. (2017)
- The Mycoplasma hyorhinis p37 Protein Rapidly Induces Genes in Fibroblasts Associated with Inflammation and Cancer. PLoS One, 10(10):24. (2015)
- MYB80 homologues in Arabidopsis, cotton and Brassica: regulation and functional conservation in tapetal and pollen development. BMC Plant Biology, 14:1-14. (2014)
- Modifications of a conserved regulatory network involving INDEHISCENT controls multiple aspects of reproductive tissue development in Arabidopsis. New Phytologist, 197(1):73-87. (2013)
- Tapetal development and abiotic stress: A centre of vulnerability. Functional Plant Biology, 39(7):553-559. (2012)
- The effects of modifying RhoA and Rac1 activities on heterotypic contact inhibition of locomotion. FEBS Letters, 586(9):1330-1335 (2012)
- MYB80, a regulator of tapetal and pollen development, is functionally conserved in crops. Plant Molecular Biology, 78(1-2):171-183. (2012)
- The MYB80 transcription factor is required for pollen development and the regulation of tapetal programmed cell death in Arabidopsis thaliana. Plant Cell, 23(6):2209-2224. (2011)
- Death of a tapetum: A programme of developmental altruism. Plant Science, 178, 73–89. (2010)
- Functional analysis of HvSPY, a negative regulator of GA response, in barley aleurone cells and Arabidopsis. Planta, 229(3):523-537. (2009)
- The Arabidopsis AtMYB5 gene regulates mucilage synthesis, seed coat development and trichome morphogenesis. Plant Cell, 21, 72-89. (2009)
- Combinatorial interactions of multiple cis-elements regulating the induction of the Arabidopsis XERO2 dehydrin gene by abscisic acid and cold. Plant Journal, 54(1):15-29. (2008)
- Suppression and restoration of male fertility using a transcription factor. Plant Biotech. J., 5, 297-313. (2007)
