= Robert Lovell Reid =

Australian scientist

Robert Lovell Reid, FRSE (11 April 1921 – 23 September 1996) was an Australian agricultural scientist.

== Life ==
He was born in Melbourne on 11 April 1921. His family then moved to Sydney in 1928 where he was educated at Fort Street High School. He then studied Agricultural Science at the University of Sydney, graduating BSc. in 1944. He then went to England to gain a doctorate (PhD) at Cambridge University.

In the 1960s, he went to Scotland as assistant director of the Hill Farming Research Organisation and was later promoted to be its director.

In 1967, he was elected a Fellow of the Royal Society of Edinburgh. His proposers were George Boddie, Arthur Wannop, Sir Stephen J. Watson, and John Stamp.

He was the founding professor of Agricultural Science at La Trobe University in 1968. The R. L. Reid Building in the university is named after him.

He retired in 1979 and died in Canberra on 23 September 1996.

== Family ==
He was married to Catherine Helen Macgregor (d.1980). Their children included Ronia Julie Reid.

== Publications ==
- The South Australian Elections 1959 (1962)
- Animals in Agriculture (1969)
- Proceedings of the 3rd World Conference on Animal Production (1975)
- Healthy Eating in Australia (1984)
- The Manual of Australian Agriculture (reprinted 2013)
