= Joanna Poyago-Theotoky =

Greek economist

- Born: Corfu, Greece
- Known for: Research on research joint ventures, R&D cooperation, and green innovation

Academic background
- Education: National and Kapodistrian University of Athens (BSc); University of Bristol (MSc, PhD)
- Doctoral advisor: David Ulph

Academic work
- Discipline: Industrial organization, environmental economics
- Institutions: University of Salento
- Website: www.poyago-theotoky.com

Joanna A. Poyago-Theotoky (Greek: Ιωάννα Πογιάγου-Θεοτόκη)) is a Greek economist, full professor of economic policy at the University of Salento in Lecce, Italy, and a guest professor at the University of East Anglia and the Australian National University. She is known for her research on R&D cooperation, research joint ventures, technological innovation, and technology and environmental policy.

== Education ==
Poyago-Theotoky studied economics at the National and Kapodistrian University of Athens and at the University of Bristol, where she earned her MSc and PhD; her doctoral supervisor was David Ulph.

== Career ==
Poyago-Theotoky taught at the University of Bristol (1990–1993), the University of Nottingham (1993–2002), the University of St Andrews (2002–2003) and Loughborough University (2004–2011), where she was professor of microeconomics. She was then professor of economics at La Trobe University in Melbourne from 2010 to 2020, serving as head of the School of Economics from 2012 to 2015. She has been a guest professor at the University of East Anglia (Norwich Business School) and the Australian National University (Research School of Economics) since 2020, and a visiting professor at the University of Zurich (2018; 2019–2020).

She served as an adviser to the Australian Government on learning standards for Economics bachelor's and master's degrees, as an evaluator for Excellence in Research for Australia, and as a reviewer of research proposals for the ESRC and the Leverhulme Trust.

== Research ==
Her research interests lie in industrial organization — especially innovation, R&D cooperation and research joint ventures, and technology and environmental policies — applied microeconomic theory, and the economics of science and knowledge transfer. Her papers have appeared in journals including Energy Economics, the European Journal of Operational Research, the Journal of Economic Behavior and Organization, the Journal of Industrial Economics, the International Journal of Industrial Organization and the Journal of Public Economic Theory.

== Public engagement ==
Poyago-Theotoky has taken part in public debate in her native Corfu over the regeneration of the Garitsa and Anemomylos parks: in March 2022 she published an opinion piece criticizing the planned planting of Acacia saligna — an Australian species listed by the European Union among invasive alien species since 2019 — to replace trees scheduled to be uprooted, calling the choice contrary to EU rules on invasive alien species. In an open letter to the Mayor of Central Corfu she invoked the civic legacy of her great-grandfather Georgios Theotokis, who had served as Mayor of Corfu — overseeing, among other works, the shaping of the Garitsa seafront — before serving as Prime Minister of Greece.

== Personal life ==
Poyago-Theotoky was born on the island of Corfu. She is the daughter of Elisabeth ("Loulou") Theotoki (1924–2013), a dancer and choreographer who founded Corfu's first dance school in 1965 and created the "Κερκυραϊκό Χορόδραμα" in 1969, and of Spyros Pogiago, a Corfu physician and painter. Through her mother she is a granddaughter of Ioannis Theotokis, who served as Prime Minister of Greece in 1950, and a great-granddaughter of four-time Prime Minister Georgios Theotokis; her mother's first cousin was Prime Minister Georgios Rallis.

== Selected works ==
- Poyago-Theotoky, J. (ed.) (1997). Competition, Cooperation and R&D: The Economics of Research Joint Ventures. Macmillan / St Martin's Press.
- Poyago-Theotoky, J. (ed.) (2026). Green Innovation and Industrial Organization. World Scientific.
