= Catherine Day (biochemist) =

New Zealand biochemist

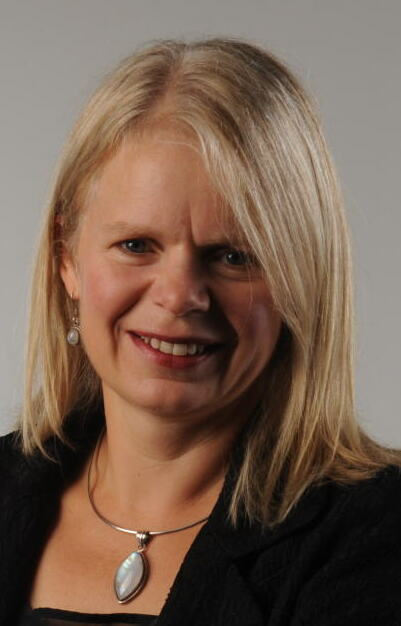
- Day in 2012
- Education: Massey University
- Scientific career
- Thesis: Expression and characterisation of the n-terminal half of human lactoferrin (1993)

Catherine Louise Day is a New Zealand biochemist. She is currently a professor and was the head of the biochemistry department at the University of Otago.

== Career ==
After a BSc at Massey University, Day completed a PhD entitled Expression and characterisation of the n-terminal half of human lactoferrin in 1993, also at Massey, before moving to the University of Otago where she rose to professor and head of department.

Day has received funding from the Health Research Council of New Zealand and Genesis Oncology Trust and is an associate editor for biochemistry and biophysics of the Royal Society's Open Science Journal.

== Awards ==
Day won the Otago School of Medical Sciences' top award for 2010.

== Selected works ==
- Chen, Lin, Simon N. Willis, Andrew Wei, Brian J. Smith, Jamie I. Fletcher, Mark G. Hinds, Peter M. Colman, Catherine L. Day, Jerry M. Adams, and David CS Huang. "Differential targeting of prosurvival Bcl-2 proteins by their BH3-only ligands allows complementary apoptotic function." Molecular Cell 17, no. 3 (2005): 393–403.
- Van Delft, Mark F., Andrew H. Wei, Kylie D. Mason, Cassandra J. Vandenberg, Lin Chen, Peter E. Czabotar, Simon N. Willis et al. "The BH3 mimetic ABT-737 targets selective Bcl-2 proteins and efficiently induces apoptosis via Bak/Bax if Mcl-1 is neutralized." Cancer cell 10, no. 5 (2006): 389–399.
- Verhagen, Anne M., John Silke, Paul G. Ekert, Miha Pakusch, Hitto Kaufmann, Lisa M. Connolly, Catherine L. Day et al. "HtrA2 promotes cell death through its serine protease activity and its ability to antagonize inhibitor of apoptosis proteins." Journal of Biological Chemistry 277, no. 1 (2002): 445–454.
- Czabotar, Peter E., Erinna F. Lee, Mark F. van Delft, Catherine L. Day, Brian J. Smith, David CS Huang, W. Douglas Fairlie, Mark G. Hinds, and Peter M. Colman. "Structural insights into the degradation of Mcl-1 induced by BH3 domains." Proceedings of the National Academy of Sciences 104, no. 15 (2007): 6217–6222.
