= Jamila Gordon =

Somali Australian entrepreneur

- Education: A degree in IT from the La Trobe University
- Occupations: CEO and founder of Lumachain
- Spouse: Revel Gordon

Jamila Gordon is a Somali Australian entrepreneur. She is the chief executive officer and founder of an Australian SaaS company applying AI and Blockchain to food supply channels (Lumachain). After escaping the Somalian Civil War at the age of eighteen, she was a displaced person in Kenya before moving to Australia, where she received a degree in IT from the La Trobe University. Gordon later served as the CIO at Qantas and Leighton Holdings/CIMIC, and as an executive at IBM. She was subsequently named as Microsoft's Global Awardee in the International Women's Entrepreneurship Challenge 2018, Australia & New Zealand Innovator of the Year in the Women in AI Awards 2020, NSW Pearcey Entrepreneur of the Year 2021. She was recognized as one of the BBC's 100 women of 2021.

== Early life and education ==
Jamila Gordon was born to a nomadic family in the hinterland of Somalia and brought up in a small village as one of 16 children. As the eldest daughter, she was expected to play a key role in running the family home from approximately five years old, and these responsibilities took precedence over her education. Her family moved to Mogadishu when she was 11 years old to avoid a drought. Once civil war broke out, she became a displaced person in Kenya. There, Gordon met an Australian backpacker, who helped her move to Australia. After arriving in Australia, Gordon took English courses at TAFE NSW and enrolled in an accounting degree at La Trobe University in Melbourne. She switched her major to software engineering after taking a programming elective and eventually graduated with a Bachelor of Business and Information Technology degree in 1995.

== Career ==
=== Early ===
Gordon stated she worked as a dish washer and a kitchen hand at a local Japanese restaurant during her years in college.

=== After college ===
After graduating, Gordon was employed in software development and subsequently project management. She continued her work in software for British Gas and later at the airline Emirates. She was later employed by Deloitte, then as a senior project manager at IBM. In 2001 IBM relocated her to Europe, working across cities in multiple countries where she had led global rollouts at IBM customers including Solectron, AXA Insurance and ABN AMRO Bank. In 2007, she was hired as a chief information officer for Qantas airways, and then for Leighton Holdings/CIMIC.

=== Lumachain ===
In April 2018, Gordon founded Lumachain, a company that provides a blockchain and computer vision software for the meat industry, with $3.5 million in seed funding, in a round led by the CSIRO venture capital fund (Main Sequence Ventures). Its stated aim is to add transparency to global food supply chains and provide an auditable record to prove if an item comes from ethically responsible sources (e.g. worker conditions, health code compliance). In 2019, the company partnered with Microsoft, JBS S.A. and CSIRO for a large scale trials.

== Awards ==
- 2009 La Trobe University Distinguished Alumni Award.
- 2018 Global Awardee, Microsoft International Women Entrepreneurship Challenge (IWEC).
- 2020 NSW Pearcey Entrepreneur of the Year Award, Pearcey Foundation.
- 2021 Australia & NZ Innovator of the Year, Women in AI Awards.
- 2021 BBC's 100 women.

== Personal life ==
Gordon is an advocate for diversity and inclusivity of women in STEM, and is helping refugees from various backgrounds in succeeding in Australia. She cites in particular her experiences in child labour as a driving factor in her socially responsible business work through technology. In this capacity she has previously volunteered as a board member at the CareerSeekers and the CareerTrackers social organizations. She is also a global ambassador at the IWEC Foundation and serves as a member on the Advisory Council of Questacon.
