= Ádám Mechler =

Materials scientist

Ádám István Mechler
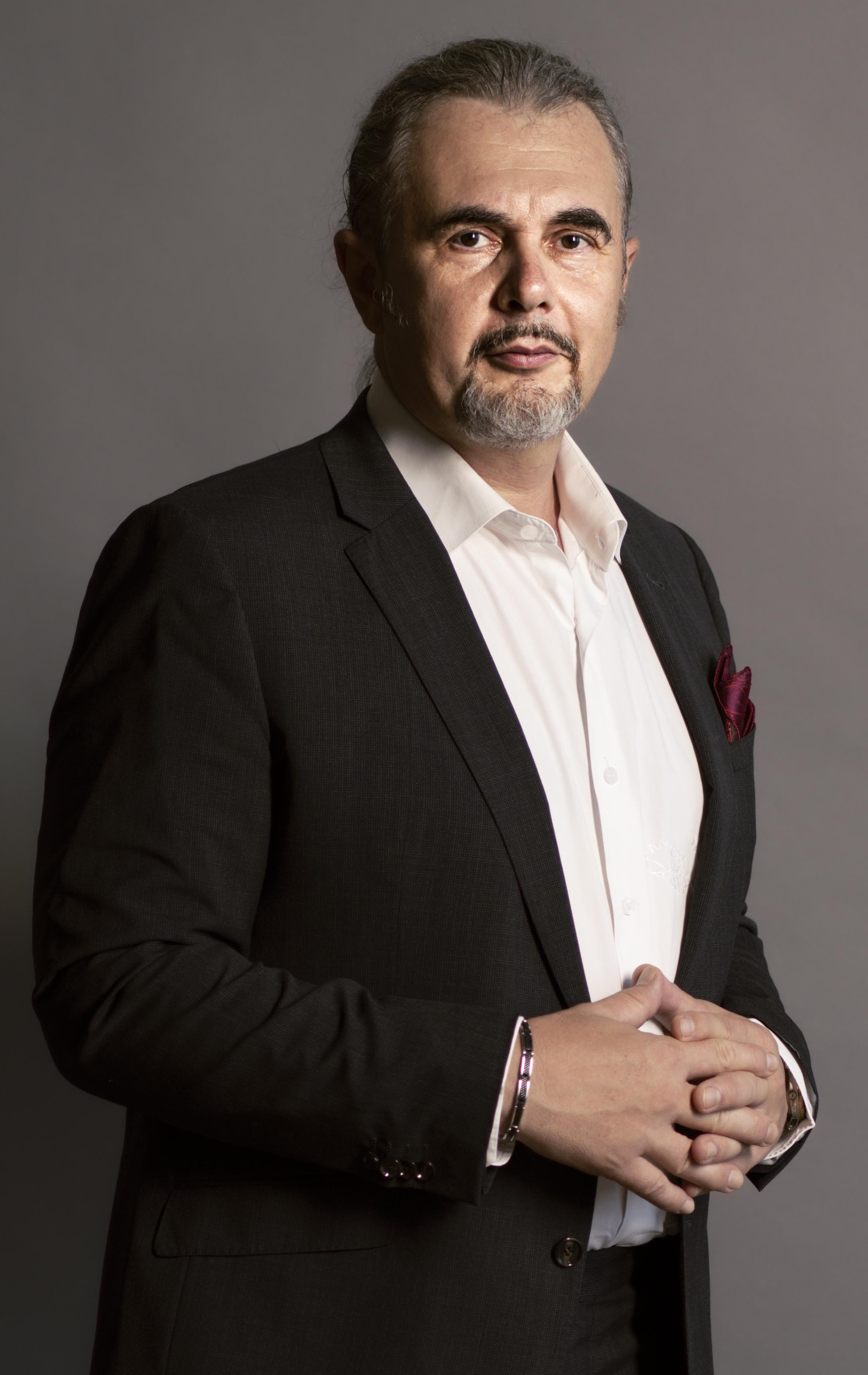
- Occupations: Materials scientist and academic

Academic background
- Education: Diploma., Physics, Chemistry and Education; PhD., Physics
- Alma mater: University of Szeged

Academic work
- Institutions: La Trobe University

Ádám István Mechler is a materials scientist and academic most known for his research on intermolecular interactions in physical chemistry, as well as on molecular machines, hierarchical metamaterials, and self-assembling systems inspired by biology. He is a professor of Chemistry at La Trobe University, Australia, where he leads the Bioinspired self-assembling nanostructures research group. He is also the Academic Program Director of the IIT Kanpur - La Trobe University Research Academy and the BITS Pilani - La Trobe University joint PhD program.

== Education and career ==
Mechler earned a Diploma (BSc and MSc) in Chemistry and Physics in 1996, followed by a PhD in physics at the University of Szeged in 2001. Subsequently, he worked at the University of California, Santa Barbara, for three years, during which his research focus shifted to bioinspired materials and biomolecule interactions. In 2004, he moved to Australia to Monash University, where he established his independent research program focusing on biomolecule self-assembly, membrane biophysics, and peptide-membrane interactions while continuing to explore bioinspired materials and bioactive natural products.

In 2009, Mechler joined La Trobe University as a Senior Lecturer in the Department of Chemistry, was later appointed associate professor in 2016, and has held the position of Professor since 2021.

For his work, Mechler was honored with the Government of Australia Office of Learning and Teaching National Citation For Outstanding Student Learning in 2013 and was elected Fellow of the Royal Society of Chemistry in 2016.

== Research ==
Mechler has contributed to the field of materials science through his work on self-assembling systems, lipid membranes, biophysical chemistry, antimicrobial peptides, and metallosupramolecular systems.

=== Antimicrobial peptides and biomembranes ===
Mechler's research on biomolecular interactions has focused on lipid membranes, their phase and domain dynamics, and membrane disruption by antimicrobial peptides. He utilized spectroscopic imaging and near-field microscopy to show that cholesterol-rich domains in bilayer membranes form optimally at a 15:85 lipid-cholesterol ratio, with specific domain separation occurring at lower concentrations. Additionally, he found that the structure of supported phospholipid bilayers varies with liposome size, composition, and substrate, as shown by quartz crystal microbalance and atomic force microscopy.

Working with Imad Younus Hasan, Mechler employed QCM-based measurements to show cholesterol induces phase separation in single bilayer lipid membranes and demonstrated that partially suspended DMPC-based bilayer membranes can form on functionalized gold surfaces in a way that allows natural membrane movement, providing a truly Biomimetic platform for membrane studies and protein insertion. They also mapped thermodynamic phase transitions of lipid membranes, through nanoviscosity measurements, in single bilayer lipid membranes, revealing that domain separation occurs only in planar membranes and that phase transitions are due to the breaking of van der Waals interactions.

Using quartz crystal microbalance and atomic force microscopy, Mechler and his research group investigated how specific antimicrobial peptides secreted by insects such as honeybees and amphibians such as Australian tree frogs disrupt bacterial membranes. Among other contributions, his research introduced oncocin, a novel antimicrobial peptide optimized for treating Gram-negative bacteria, showing effective activity and improved stability in mouse serum without causing lysis or toxicity. Later, he showed that LL-37 acts through pore formation in membranes made of unsaturated lipids whereas it yields membrane modulation in saturated lipids, suggesting new design strategies for antimicrobial peptide drugs.

=== Biomaterials and nanotechnology ===
Mechler engaged in the design and characterization of biomaterials, nanostructures as well as in the development of novel nanotechnologies throughout his career. He used multimodal atomic force microscopy to map charge transfer properties of the conductive copolymer poly(ethyldioxythiophene)–poly(styrenesulfonic acid), showing that efficient charge injection occurs at lamellar edges and can be improved by controlling lamellar orientation. In a collaborative project, he also presented a method utilizing surface acoustic waves to produce monodispersed submicron poly-ε-caprolactone particles, demonstrating how acoustic forces and evaporative processes influence particle size and morphology.

In a joint study, Mechler established that 14-helical N-acetyl β3-peptides self-assemble into nanofibers and that their morphology, such as nano-beams and dendritic structures, can be tuned by adjusting the solvent and inter-fibril interactions, enabling new bio- and nanomaterial applications. By using far-IR spectroscopy and DFT modeling, he confirmed the structure of self-assembled fibrous nano-materials from unnatural tripeptides, showing that far-IR spectroscopy can effectively characterize bioinspired materials where crystallographic methods fall short. He further showcased that using two binding motifs in supramolecular assemblies creates metallosupramolecular frameworks with controlled nanorod and two-dimensional structures, with copper ions forming polynuclear metal complexes. In 2023, his work highlighted that substituted beta oligoamides self-assemble into metallosupramolecular frameworks with varied structures, including thin films and three-dimensional networks, by coordinating with different transition metals and metalates.

== Awards and honors ==
- 2013 – National Citation For Outstanding Student Learning, Government of Australia Office of Learning and Teaching
- 2016 – Fellow, Royal Society of Chemistry

== Selected articles ==
- Ionescu‐Zanetti, C., Mechler, A., Carter, S. A., & Lal, R. (2004). Semiconductive polymer blends: Correlating structure with transport properties at the nanoscale. Advanced Materials, 16(5), 385–389.
- Thimm, J., Mechler, A., Lin, H., Rhee, S., & Lal, R. (2005). Calcium-dependent open/closed conformations and interfacial energy maps of reconstituted hemichannels. Journal of Biological Chemistry, 280(11), 10646–10654.
- Mechler, A., Praporski, S., Atmuri, K., Boland, M., Separovic, F., & Martin, L. L. (2007). Specific and selective peptide-membrane interactions revealed using quartz crystal microbalance. Biophysical Journal, 93(11), 3907–3916.
- Del Borgo, M. P., Mechler, A. I., Traore, D., Forsyth, C., Wilce, J. A., Wilce, M. C., ... & Perlmutter, P. (2013). Supramolecular self-assembly of N-acetyl-capped β-peptides leads to nano-to macroscale fiber formation. Angewandte Chemie International Edition, 52(32).
- Hasan, I. Y., & Mechler, A. (2017). Nanoviscosity measurements revealing domain formation in biomimetic membranes. Analytical chemistry, 89(3), 1855–1862.
- West, N. G., Bamford, S. E., Pigram, P. J., Pan, J., Qi, D. C., & Mechler, A. (2023). Controllable hierarchical self-assembly: systematic study forming metallosupramolecular frameworks on the basis of helical beta-oligoamides. Materials Horizons, 10(12), 5584–5596.
