= Erinna Lee =

Singaporean molecular biologist

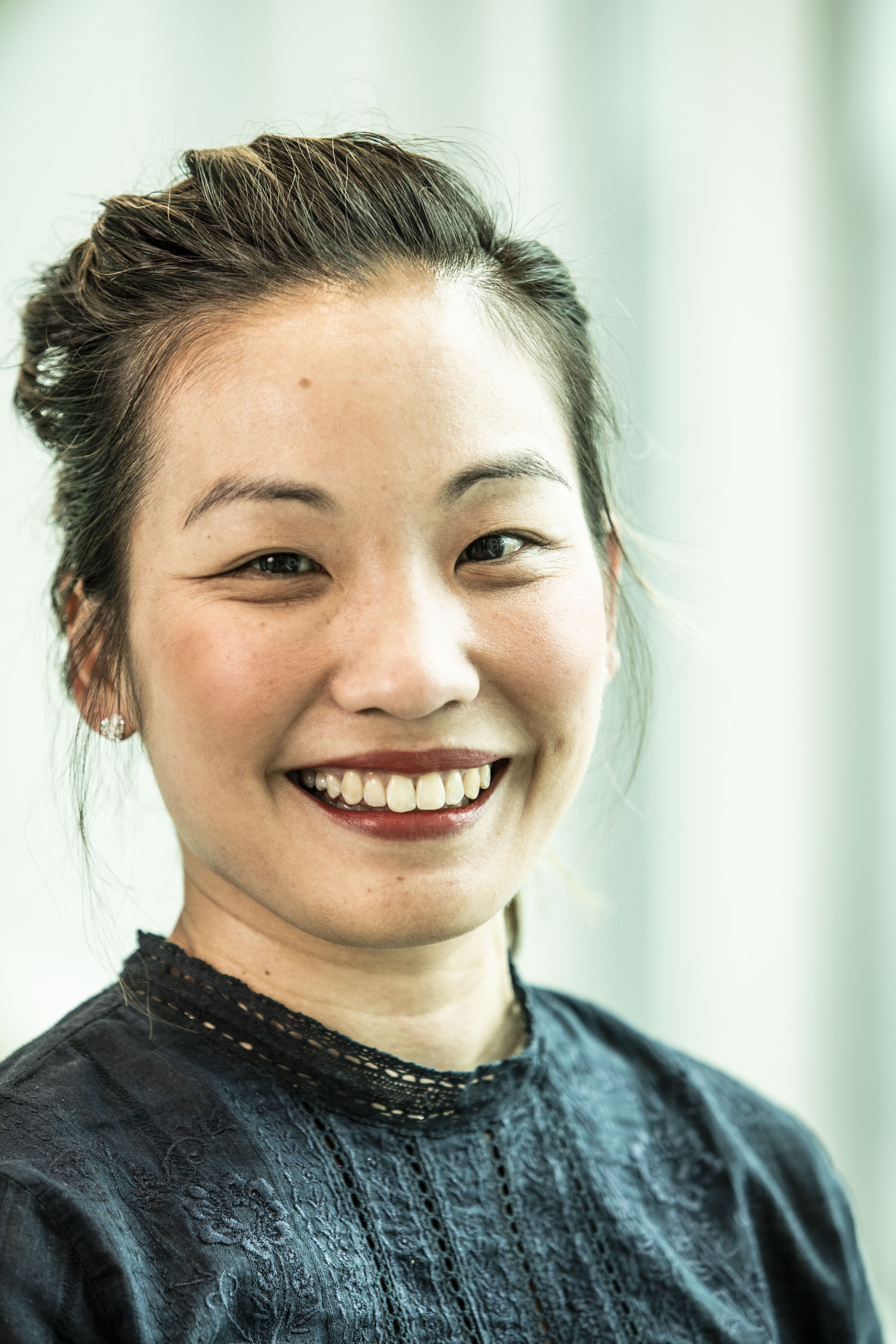
- Education: University of Melbourne
- Occupation: Molecular biologist
- Employers: Olivia Newton-John Cancer Research Institute (2015–2015); La Trobe University (2015–2015); La Trobe University (2016–); WEHI (2007–2011); WEHI (2012–2015)
- Awards: Tall poppy award (2010)
- Scientific career
- Fields: Autophagy, Bcl-2
- Workplaces: WEHI; La Trobe University; Olivia Newton-John Cancer Research Institute
- Website: scholars.latrobe.edu.au/eflee

Erinna Lee is a Singaporean molecular biologist specializing in apoptosis and autophagy.

== Early life and education ==
Erinna Lee was born in Singapore and moved to Australia after high school. She was educated at University of Melbourne, studying a BSc(hons) in Biochemistry and Molecular Biology from 2000-2004. She studied her PhD at the Walter and Eliza Hall Institute of Medical Research, which was awarded in 2007 by the University of Melbourne. It was during this PhD where she began research on programmed cell death, which would form a large part of her subsequent research career.

== Career and impact ==
After completing her PhD, Lee worked as a postdoctoral fellow at the WEHI until 2015. She then moving to work at La Trobe Institute for Molecular Science, becoming a laboratory head there in 2016 as well as being made a visiting scientist at the Olivia Newton-John Cancer Research Institute.

== Research ==
Lee's research focuses on cell death and survival, and in particular the role of the BCL-2 protein and its associated homolog family. This is typically via characterising protein-protein interactions in the BCL-2 signalling pathway via structural characterisation of the constituent proteins (both X-ray and NMR methods) as well as biochemical and biophysical characterisation of their interactions. She then applies this information to animal models to understand the contributions of these proteins to normal physiology and disease. Lee’s research has subsequently extended into autophagy more broadly and its contributions to human biology.

== Awards and honours ==
Erinna Lee was awarded a Tall poppy award in 2010, and the 2021 Shimadzu Research Medal by the Australian Society for Biochemistry and Molecular Biology.
