= Katie Holmes (historian) =

Australian historian

- Born: 1962; Sydney
- Alma mater: University of Melbourne
- Occupation: Historian
- Website: https://scholars.latrobe.edu.au/kbholmes
- Academic career
- Institutions: La Trobe University (1994–)

Katie Holmes FASSA is a professor of history at La Trobe University, Melbourne, Australia. She was elected Fellow of the Academy of the Social Sciences in Australia in 2019.

== Bibliography ==
=== Books ===
- Spaces in Her Day: Australian Women's Diaries of the 1920s and 1930s (1996) ISBN 1-86373-731-6
- Between The Leaves: Stories Of Australian Women, Writing and Gardens (2011) ISBN 978-1-74258-253-5
