= Menzies College, La Trobe University =

Coordinates: 37.721739°S 145.051924°E

Menzies College is an Australian secular residential college for undergraduate students at La Trobe University, Bundoora campus. Established in 1968, Menzies College is named after Sir Robert Menzies, 12th Prime Minister of Australia and the nation's longest-serving prime minister. Menzies College is located on the eastern side of the Melbourne (Bundoora) campus. The college is made up of single bedrooms with shared bathrooms and includes a café, fitness centre and gymnasium for use of the residents. Menzies College has a capacity of 385 residents. Dale Trendall, Australia's first Professor of Archaeology and La Trobe's only resident fellow lived at Menzies College from 1969 until his death in 1995.
