= Archibald Glenn =

Australian industrialist (1911–2012)

Sir Archibald Glenn OBE
- Born: Joseph Robert Archibald Glenn; 24 May 1911
- Died: 4 January 2012 (aged 100)
- Education: University of Melbourne
- Occupation: Industrialist
- Employer: Imperial Chemical Industries Australia
- Organization: Founding Chancellor of La Trobe University
- Children: Di Gribble

Sir Joseph Robert Archibald Glenn, OBE (24 May 1911 – 4 January 2012) was an Australian industrialist and founding Chancellor of La Trobe University.

== Biography ==
Glenn was born in 1911 and raised near Sale, Victoria. He was educated at Scotch College, Melbourne, where he moved after Sale High School found itself without a mathematics teacher. He studied engineering at the University of Melbourne and later in London. He joined ICI (Imperial Chemical Industries Australia, now known as Orica) where he became managing director for 25 years, retiring in 1973, and where he was Chairman for 10 years. During World War II he worked alongside Essington Lewis, who was in charge of war-related industry as Director-General of the Department of Munitions.

He was Chairman of the Scotch College Council from 1963 to 1981, and Ormond College Council from 1976 to 1981.

He was appointed an Officer of the Order of the British Empire (OBE) in 1965 and was knighted in 1966. He died on 4 January 2012, aged 100.

His first wife was Elizabeth "Betty" née Balderstone, whom he married in 1939. After Betty died in 1988, he married Sue Debenham. His four children included Di Gribble, editor, publisher and deputy chair of the ABC; she predeceased him by three months.

Academic offices
New title	Chancellor of La Trobe University; 1967–1972	Succeeded by Sir Reginald Smithers
