= La Trobe University =

Public university in Melbourne, Australia

Coordinates: 37.72179°S 145.047909°E

- Coat of arms
- Motto: French: Qui cherche trouve
- Motto in English: Whoever seeks shall find
- Type: Public research university
- Established: 9 December 1964; 61 years ago
- Accreditation: TEQSA
- Academic affiliations: Innovative Research Universities (IRU)
- Budget: A$863.7 million (2023)
- Visitor: Governor of Victoria
- Chancellor: John Brumby
- Vice-Chancellor: Theo Farrell
- Faculty: 1,244 (FTE, 2023)
- Administrative staff: 1,647 (FTE, 2023)
- Total staff: 3,662 (2023)
- Students: 36,128 (2023)
- Undergraduates: c. 19,170 (EFTSL, 2023)
- Postgraduates: c. 5,367 coursework (EFTSL, 2023) c. 883 research (EFTSL, 2023)
- Location: Plenty Road, Melbourne, Victoria, 3086, Australia
- Campus: 235 hectares (2.4 km^{2}) (Melbourne campus); Surburban, parkland and regional with multiple sites
- Named after: Charles La Trobe
Colours
Red, white and black
- Nicknames: La Trobians and Old Charlie (Note: The nickname La Trobian (variants include La Trober, and to a lesser extent Trobian) refers to the individuals who are a part of the university, while Old Charlie refers to the institution as a whole. For example: The opposition took on La Trobe University this week in Melbourne. It was a hard fought match against Old Charlie, with the teams separated by a goal at half time. However, the La Trobians eventually gained the lead in the latter stages of the match ...)
- Sporting affiliations: UniSport; EAEN; UBL
- Mascot: Wedge-tailed eagle
- Website: latrobe.edu.au

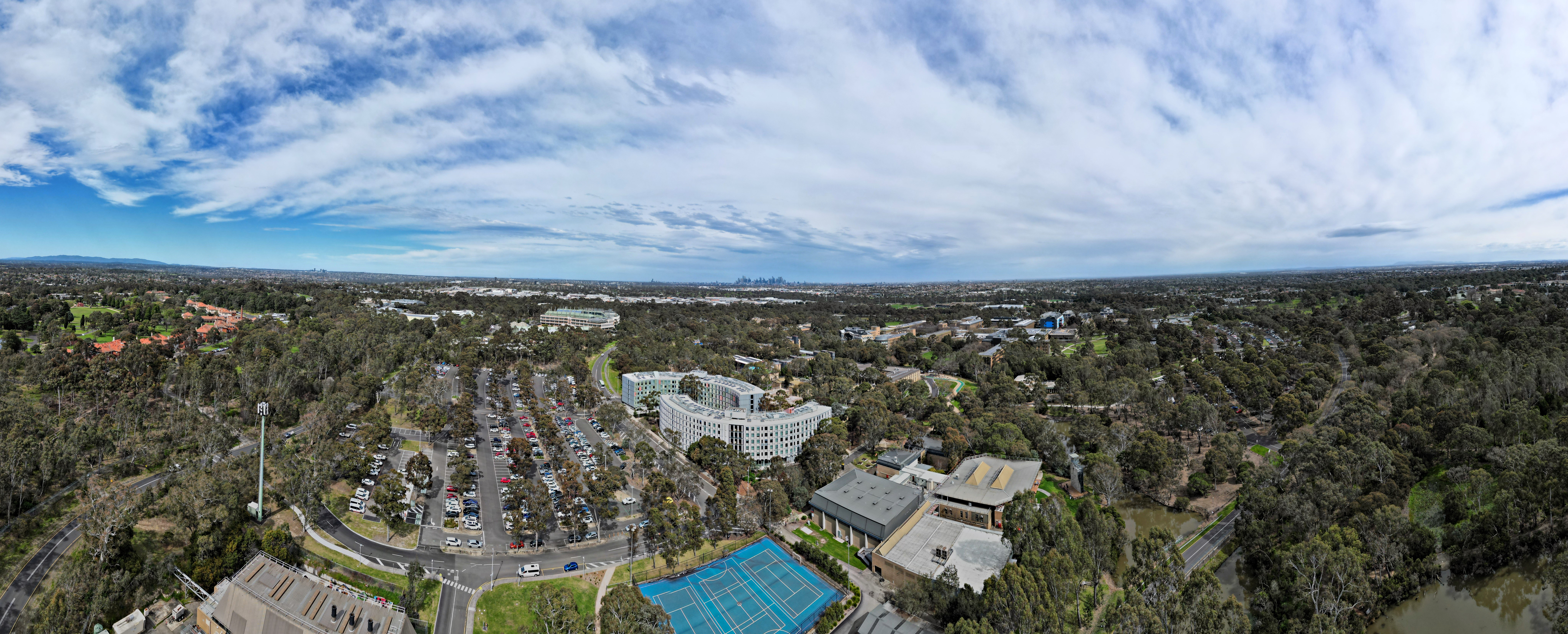
La Trobe University Bundoora Campus aerial panorama, facing south towards the city skyline. September 2023.

La Trobe University is a public research university based in Melbourne, Victoria, Australia. Its main campus is located in the suburb of Bundoora. The university was established in 1964, becoming the third university in the state of Victoria and the twelfth university in Australia. La Trobe is one of the Australian verdant universities and also part of the Innovative Research Universities group.

La Trobe's original and principal campus is located in the Melbourne metropolitan area, within the northern Melbourne suburb of Bundoora. It is the largest metropolitan campus in the country, occupying over 267 hectares (660 acres). It has two other major campuses located in the regional Victorian city of Bendigo and the twin border cities of Albury-Wodonga. There are two smaller regional campuses in Mildura and Shepparton and a city campus in Melbourne's CBD on Collins Street and in Sydney on Elizabeth Street.

La Trobe offers undergraduate and postgraduate courses across its ten schools.

== History ==
The university was established by the assent of the La Trobe University Act 1964 (No. 7189 (Vic)) on 9 December 1964. The passing of the act by the Parliament of Victoria to establish La Trobe University followed earlier university acts to establish the University of Melbourne (1853) and Monash University (1958). The Minister of Education at the time and the appointed planning council were "unanimous in their enthusiasm that the new institution should be innovative in its approach", and the university adopted an academic structure based on schools of studies (rather than on faculties) and a collegiate format, where a large number of students lived on campus. At this time, Flinders University and Macquarie University were also establishing a schools-based system.

Many prominent Victorians were involved in La Trobe's establishment process, and there was a strong belief that it was important to increase research and learning in Victoria. One of the major individuals involved was Davis McCaughey, who later became Governor of Victoria. The university was named after Charles Joseph La Trobe, the first Governor of Victoria, and the university motto, 'whoever seeks shall find', is adapted from Charles La Trobe's family motto. The La Trobe University Coat of Arms incorporates the scallop shells from the La Trobe family bearings, the Australian wedge-tailed eagle to represent Australia, and sprigs of heath to represent Victoria.

=== Origins ===
The origins of La Trobe can be traced back to the post-World War II era when there emerged a global recognition of the need to increase facilities for higher education. (Note: 'In Britain, the Robbins Committee reported in 1963 on the need for the expansion of tertiary education in that country. During the 1950s in the United States, President Dwight D. Eisenhower moved with great speed in establishing a grand plan to vastly expand facilities for higher education including many new universities.') In 1957 the prime minister, Sir Robert Menzies, established a special committee to report on the future of Australian universities, inviting Sir Keith Murray, chairman of the University Grants Committee of Great Britain, to chair it. The Murray Committee, in a far-reaching report submitted in September 1957, recommend a major expansion of university facilities in Australia and changes in administration and financing.

As a direct consequence of the key recommendations of the Murray report, the federal government established the Australian Universities Commission (AUC) in 1959, appointing Sir Leslie Martin as its chair. Menzies appointed Martin to chair a special committee in 1961 to report to the AUC on the rapidly increasing demands for higher education in Australia. In August 1963 it released its second report, which recognised the urgency of Victoria's situation, stating that "the resources of Melbourne and Monash Universities are not likely to meet the long-term demands for university education beyond 1966. The Commission therefore is willing to support in the 1964–1966 triennium the extension of university facilities in the Melbourne metropolitan area." Following the recommendations the federal government passed the Universities Assistance Bill in October 1963, providing a grant for a "third" university for recurrent expenditure in 1965 of $106,000 and $210,000 in 1966. The first capital grant was for 1966 and amounted to $1,000,000. These grants were to be matched by equivalent state grants.

=== Establishment ===
==== Third University Committee ====
In April 1964, Sir Archibald Glenn was invited by the Victorian premier, Sir Henry Bolte, to chair a "Third University Committee". In addition to Glenn, 13 other members were announced on 21 May 1964. The committee, therefore, consisted of:

- Sir Archibald Glenn, chairman and managing director, ICI Australia Ltd, Chairman
- F. H. Brookes, assistant director of education in Victoria
- Sir John Buchan, architect and chairman of Buchan, Laird & Buchan
- Sir Michael Chamberlin, deputy chancellor of Monash University
- Sir Thomas Cherry, president of the Australian Academy of Science 1961-65
- Kathleen Fitzpatrick, formerly associate professor of history at University of Melbourne
- J. A. Hepburn, chief planner at the Melbourne and Metropolitan Board of Works
- Ethleen King, president of the Free Kindergarten Union and former president of the National Council of Women
- Phillip Law, director of the Antarctic Division, Department of External Affairs
- C. E. Newman, solicitor, Numurkah, Victoria
- J. D. Norgard, general manager (operations), BHP
- W. C. Radford, director of the Australian Council for Educational Research
- R. Selby Smith, professor of education at Monash University and principal of Scotch College, Melbourne, 1953–64
- Russel G. French, secretary of the committee

The terms of reference of the committee were to advise the government on all matters concerning the establishment of a third Victorian university. This consisted of "the selection of the site, the preparation of a detailed development program, planning and calling tenders for buildings, the formulating of an administrative structure, the appointment of an Academic Planning Board and the recruitment of key staff." It was planned that La Trobe would enrol students, if possible, in March 1967.

==== Selecting the site ====
The first meeting of the committee occurred on 2 June 1964 in the rooms of the Historical Society of Victoria on Victoria Street. From there, they acted promptly in seeking out a suitable metropolitan location, inspecting 27 sites from a list of 57 possibilities. (Note: "A number of these prospects were the result of submissions by local councils and other interested groups")

The main constraints facing all options were area – "adequate for a full and balanced university"; cost – preferably Crown owned land, as private land would require large compensation payments; and locality – somewhere reasonably close to the demographic centre of Melbourne (calculated to be in the Camberwell area) and to public transport.

A subcommittee, headed by Phillip Law, quickly recognised that "somewhere on the eastern side of Melbourne stands out as the right location", however, Monash was already growing in the southeastern suburbs so an alternative area was sought. An early list of possibilities read:

Outer – Bundoora, Lilydale. Inner – Burnley Horticultural College, Wattle Park, Caulfield Racecourse, Kew Mental Asylum

Selection of an inner site was unlikely, as they were mostly "either inadequate or unattainable, especially the racecourse", however, the Kew site was a real possibility.

The "ultimate choice" was unanimously agreed upon by the end of July, resulting in the farm attached to the Mont Park Asylum. Cunningham Dax, head of the Mental Health Authority, was "most co-operative", although he raised concerns that the loss of the farm would be serious for the hospital. An alternative site for the farm was procured a little further out on Plenty Road, resolving the issue.

==== Naming the university ====
While it was an interesting interpretation of a "local name", La Trobe, proposed by Fitzpatrick, was agreed unanimously upon by the planning committee after some alternatives, such as Deakin, were "thoughtfully put aside". (Note: "[P]robably the most distinguished name among Victorians born in Victoria".) Victorian State Parliamentarians, however, were far from unanimous when they came to debate the La Trobe University Bill. (Note: "'redolent of the Folies Bergère and prurient Parisian life' complained one who, perhaps more seriously, proposed 'Churchill' as an alternative.")

Sir Archibald Glenn, chairman of the committee, provided a concise summary as to why La Trobe was chosen:

"Lieutenant-Governor Charles Joseph La Trobe has great historic significance for Victoria and his name is recognised internationally. La Trobe was not a university man ... (Note: 'La Trobe enrolled at Magdalene College at Cambridge but it is doubtful whether he ever attended a lecture'.) but he appears to have had almost every quality, one would desire in one. He had a lively interest in every aspect of life of the community, the will to work for the good of other men, and a sense of responsibility towards prosperity."

The Victorian Minister for Education, Sir John Bloomfield, upon presenting the enabling bill to the Victorian parliament, reflected on the influence of Charles La Trobe in the foundation of the University of Melbourne over 100 years before, concluding "my most satisfying reflection at this moment is that my father's father sought for gold in our hills, and he knew this city in the days of the man whom, at the behest of others, I am now trying to acknowledge. If Providence and this Parliament will it, my son's son may be taught in his aura and tradition."

Although La Trobe, like his father, used "La Trobe" and "Latrobe" interchangeably, the committee selected the spelling that was predominantly used by his side of the family.

==== Interim council ====
Following the passing of the La Trobe University Act, the interim council was established in December 1964. Aside from Sir Michael Chamberlin and Kathleen Fitzpatrick, who indicated they were unavailable, all members of the Third University Committee were appointed to the interim council, with Sir Archibald Glenn remaining as chairman. Additional members of the interim council were:

- Keith Aickin, barrister
- Sir Frank Macfarlane Burnet, Nobel Prize for Medicine 1960, professor of experimental medicine and director of the Walter and Eliza Hall Institute, president of the Australian Academy of Science 1965-69
- J. Andrews, professor of geography, University of Melbourne, (Note: Appointed to Interim Council in May 1965)
- Bernard Callinan, consulting engineer and commissioner of the SEC.
- Michael Clarke, representing Northern Province, Victorian Legislative Council
- John Galbally, barrister, representing Melbourne North and Opposition Leader, Victorian Legislative Council
- Davis McCaughey, Master of Ormond College, University of Melbourne
- Joe Rafferty, representing Ormond, Victorian Legislative Assembly
- Peter Thwaites, principal of Geelong College
- David Myers, vice-chancellor (ex officio). (Note: Became a member on taking up appointment of 1 September 1965.)

Sir Thomas Cherry died late in 1966, prior to the final meeting of the interim council. All other members automatically became members of council upon its establishment with the first meeting held on 19 December 1966. It was this meeting that Sir Archibald was elected as chancellor of the university.

=== La Trobe eras ===
The concept of the "La Trobe eras" was first coined by William Breen and John Salmond in the university's 25th anniversary history, Building La Trobe University: Reflections on the first 25 years 1964–1989. It is used to refer to La Trobe in periods of 25 years, following the year of establishment in 1964 rather than the year of opening in 1967. (Note: "This year (1989) will mark not just the first quarter century but the end of the first era of La Trobe's history. It is likely that the second era will witness the emergence of a very different institution, much larger, much more diverse in its offerings, and catering to a broader range of student needs than in the past.") As of 2015, La Trobe is currently in its third era.

=== First era: 1964–1989 ===
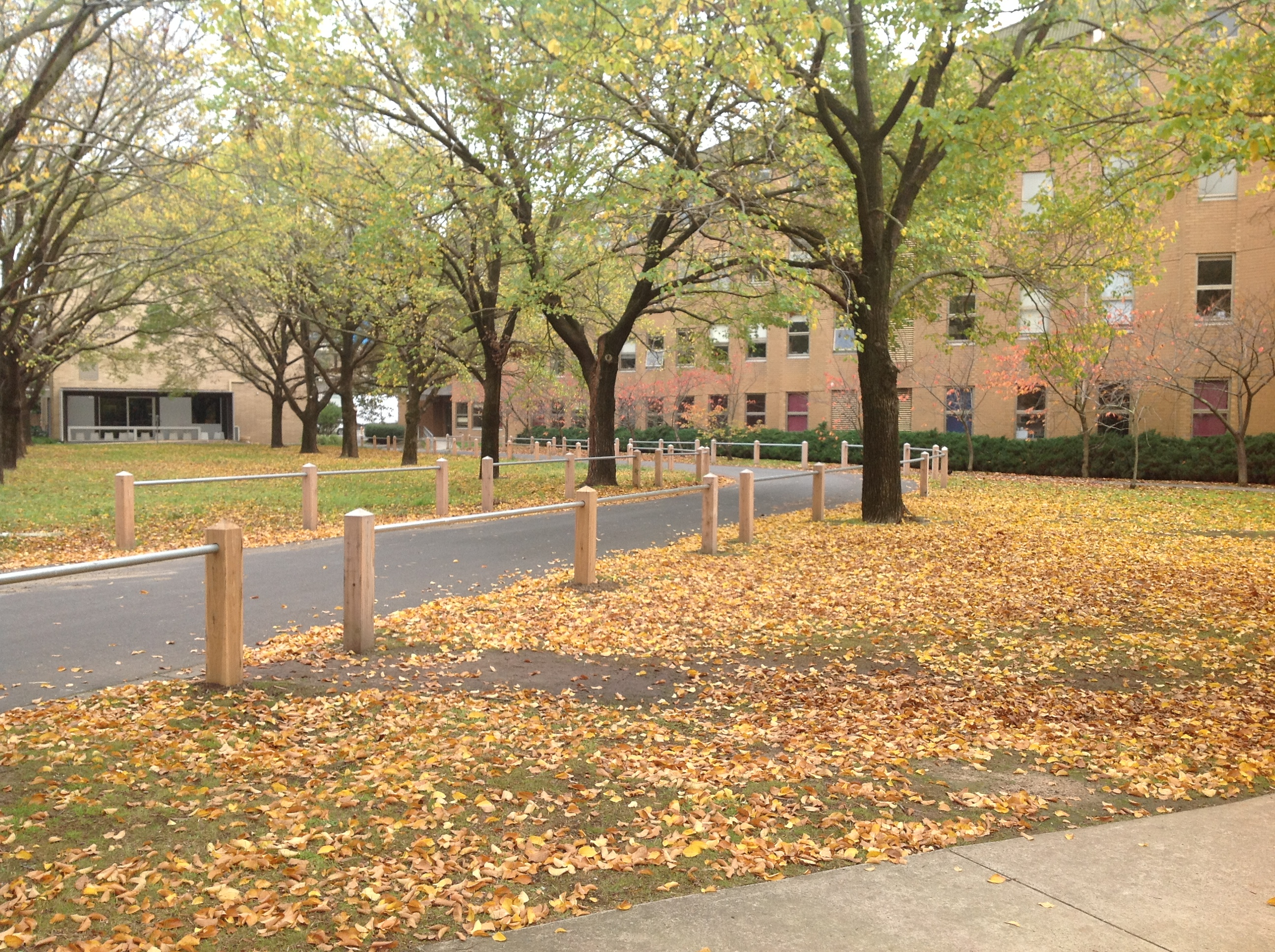
Martin Building in autumn

La Trobe University was officially opened by the Victorian premier, Sir Henry Bolte, on 8 March 1967 at a ceremony that was attended by a number of dignitaries including former Prime Minister of Australia, Robert Menzies. Teaching commenced at the Bundoora campus in the first semester of that year, with some 500 students. La Trobe was seen to be unique amongst Australian universities due to its school-based and collegiate structure. At the time, "this novel approach became commonly known in the university as 'The La Trobe Concept'". Within four years, however, this format had all but broken down, with the collegiate ideal reduced to halls of residence and the schools becoming departmentalised.

Up until the late 1980s, La Trobe focused almost exclusively on the liberal arts and the sciences. In 1987 the Lincoln Institute of Health Sciences merged with the university. The Lincoln Institute had begun as Lincoln House, after the building was bought by the government in 1966, with its formal constitution being established in December 1972. Lincoln House comprised professional training schools for occupational therapy, physiotherapy and speech therapy, all of which were affiliated with the Victoria Institute of Colleges. Lincoln Institute thus became the university's Faculty of Health Sciences, offering several professional health science programs.

=== Second era: 1990–2014 ===
The university established other professional schools, including its law school in 1992, which was previously a legal studies department established in 1972. In 2008, Victoria's second dentistry school was established at La Trobe. However, despite being a leading Australian university in professional health and biomedical sciences, La Trobe does not have a medical school. When planned and developed in the 1960s, there was strong expectation that La Trobe would eventually establish a medical school and a teaching hospital.

The Bendigo campus of La Trobe dates back to 1873: the Bendigo College of Advanced Education amalgamated with La Trobe University in 1991, completing a process that began in the late 1980s as part of the Dawkins reforms to higher education. During the merger process, a controversial issue erupted when the university's head office in Bundoora raised concerns about the academic standards at Bendigo CAE. This led to a public outcry in which Bendigo CAE students threatened the Bendigo Advertiser over publishing the matter in its newspapers. Several newspapers were burned in the protest.

The inclusion of the Wodonga Institute of Tertiary Education took place in the same year. The university continued to expand, with the opening of campuses in Shepperton (1994), Mildura (1996), the Research and Development Park at Bundoora and sites in the Melbourne CBD.

==== Funding and cutbacks ====
Higher education reforms by the Howard government allowed Australian universities to increase fees and take in a greater number of full-fee paying students. Despite a large student backlash, La Trobe took advantage of the reforms, increasing fees by 25% in 2005. Around the same time, the university suffered cutbacks in government funding, a problem experienced across most of the Australian higher education sector.

La Trobe lost funding disproportionately across its departments. For instance, the History Department at the university was once by far the largest of any institution in Australia; however, funding restrictions led to a significant reduction in its size. Similarly, in 1999, the Music Department was closed due to funding cuts; in 2004 the Geology Department was excised even though it had the highest graduate satisfaction rating in the country. The university's African Research Institute, the only major African studies centre in Australasia, was closed at the end of 2006. In 2008, the university cut the Philosophy and Religious Studies Program at the Bendigo campus, the change resulted in the stream only being taught as a minor.

In 2008, La Trobe was operating with a $1.46 million surplus but highlighted that by 2010 it would "review, and where appropriate, restructure all academic, administrative and committee structures" to deal with diminished student intakes, falling entrance marks, below-par scores on student satisfaction surveys and a decreasing proportion of national research funding. In an attempt to address these issues, the university made cut backs and restructured several courses under the direction of the Vice-Chancellor, John Dewar. As of 2013, the university was operating on a 28 million dollar surplus.

=== Third era: 2015–present ===
In 2015, La Trobe University committed to fully divest from fossil fuels, after a campaign by students and faculty. The university later committed in 2019 to become fully carbon neutral in its own operations by 2029.

==== COVID-19 pandemic ====
In 2020, La Trobe University had its operations substantially impacted by the COVID-19 pandemic. In March, part of the Bundoora campus had to be closed for a deep clean after a student tested positive for the disease. The university remained open for a time, until the health advice from the Department of Health and Human Services indicated the university should close - although a limited number of courses eventually continued in a face-to-face teaching mode. Classes not run face-to-face were continued online.

This, combined with a reduction in international student enrolments, purportedly weakened the university's financial position - although the extent to which this occurred is debated. Reports circulated that La Trobe University risked exhausting its cash reserves unless a deal was with reached with financial institutions or the federal government but the university has stated that it was not at risk of insolvency. A range of measures were proposed or taken to improve the university's finances including voluntary redundancies, and staff pay cuts. La Trobe had applied for access to the Australian government wage subsidy program, JobKeeper, but it was deemed ineligible.

Other steps taken by the university in response to the pandemic include: opening up new pathways for student enrolment that did not require an ATAR, removing failing grades from student transcripts and offering new short courses.

== Campuses and buildings ==
=== Melbourne (Bundoora) ===
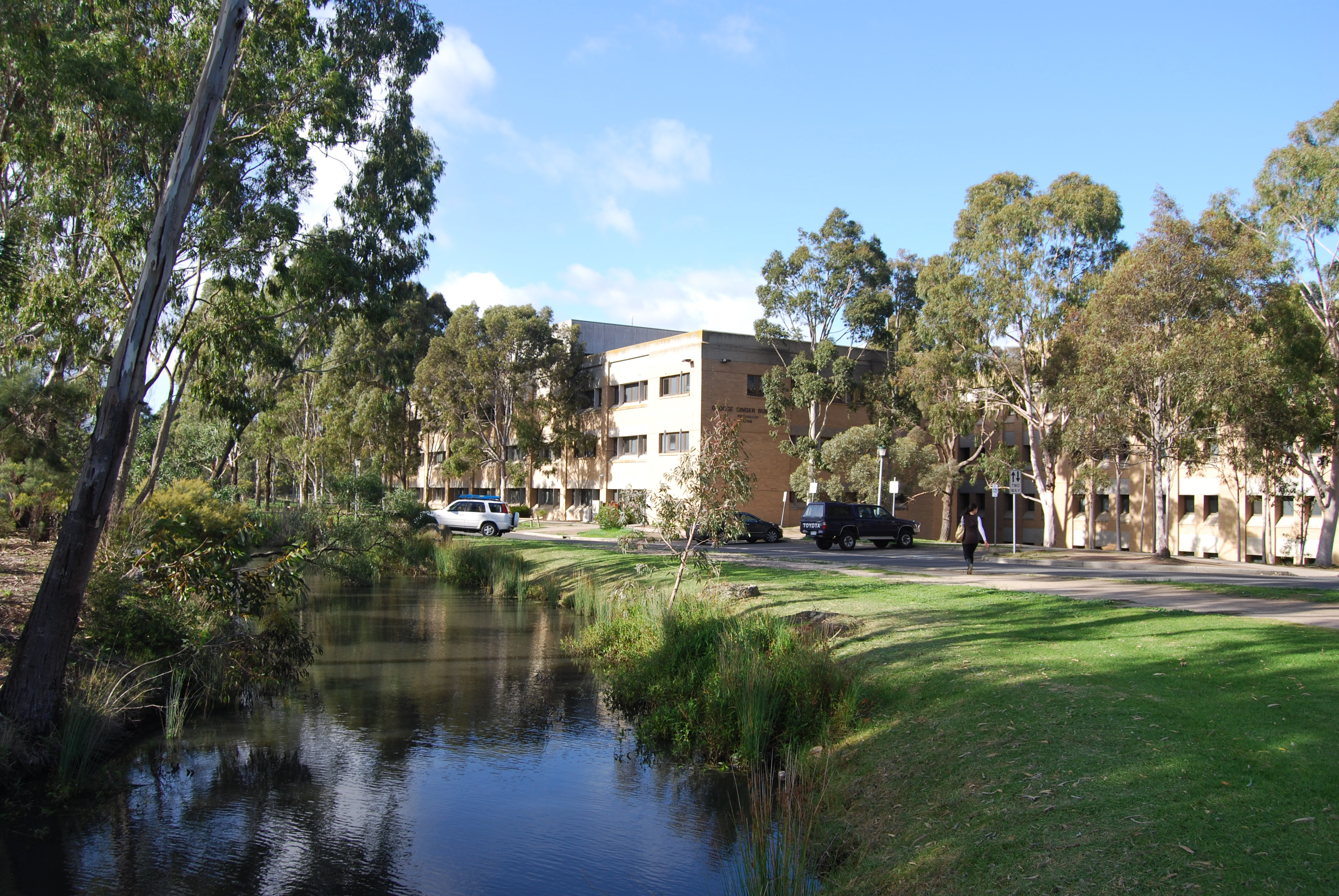
Moat and George Singer Building, La Trobe University Bundoora Campus

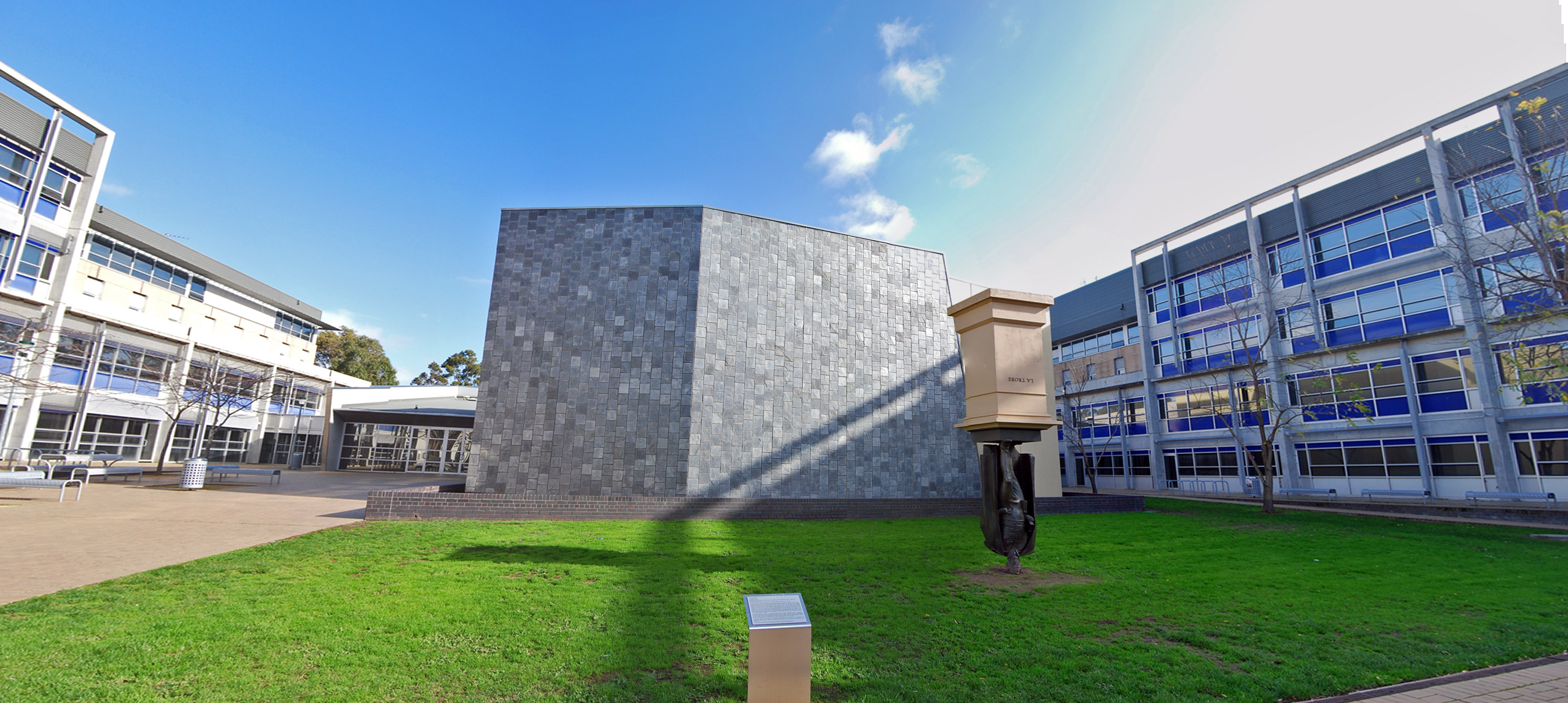
Health Sciences Building

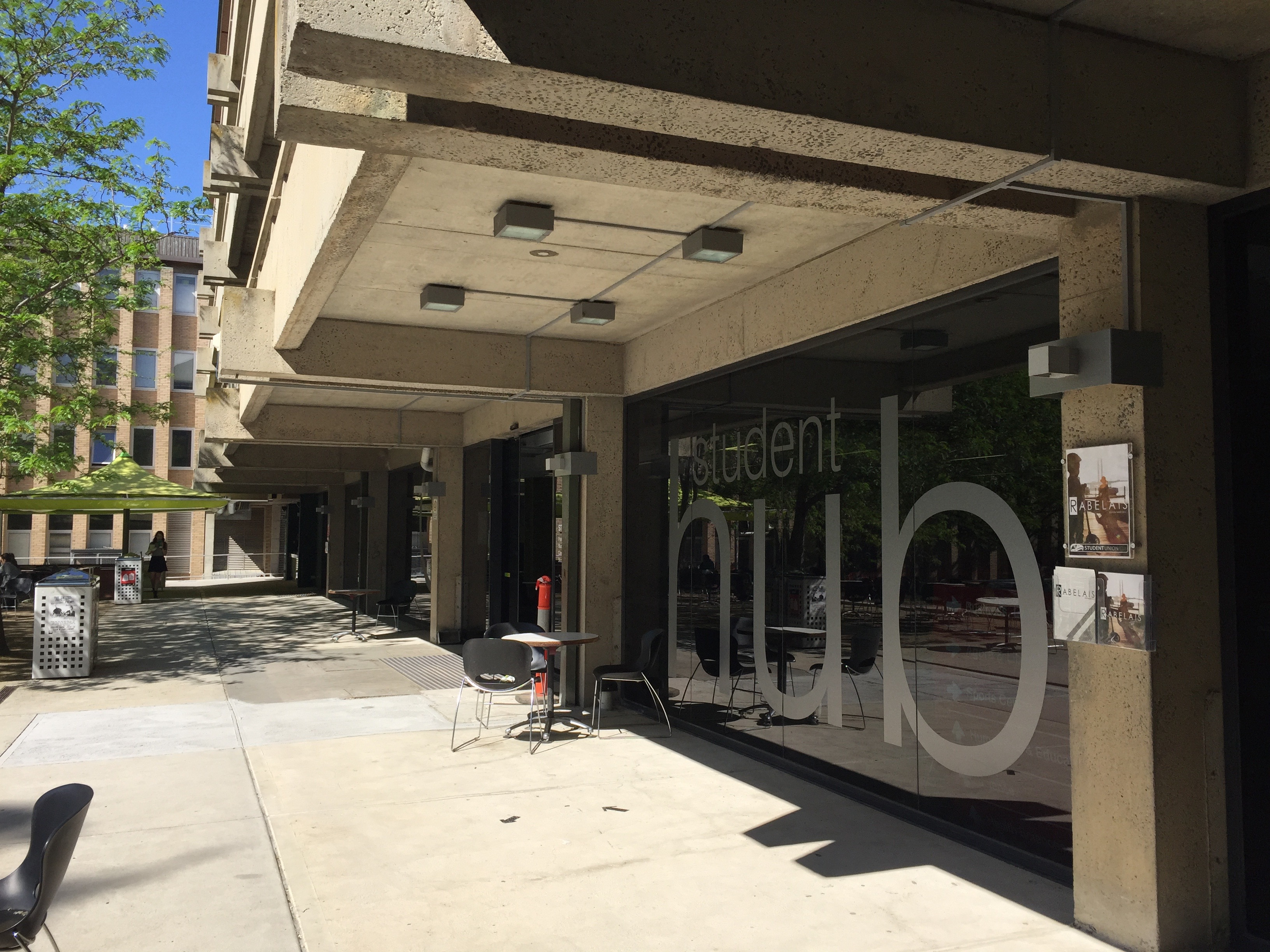
Student hub

The Melbourne campus at Bundoora is the foundation campus of La Trobe and was officially opened in 1967 when La Trobe began operations. The campus is the main base of all La Trobe's main courses except education, pharmacy, and dentistry, all of which are based at Bendigo. Bundoora is the largest university campus in the Southern Hemisphere, encompassing 235 hectares (580 acres), including the adjacent Nangak Tamboree Wildlife Sanctuary.

Bundoora has around 22,000 students on campus and therefore has many facilities such as restaurants, bars, shops, banks and an art gallery. The main library on the campus, the Borchardt, has well over one million volumes.

The original main campus buildings were designed by Melbourne architecture firm, Yuncken Freeman in a utilitarian, Post-War International style. These buildings are connected by a series of raised walkways. La Trobe University has three on-campus residential colleges: Menzies, Glenn and Chisholm. These are complemented by the newer North and South Apartments, the self-contained Barnes Way and Waterdale Apartments and the University Lodge, which primarily serves postgraduate students.

Prior to the COVID-19 pandemic, La Trobe University had developed plans to transform the Bundoora campus into a 'City of the Future', closely co-locating commercial, cultural and research facilities onto the site.

==== On-campus facilities ====
The Bundoora campus is home to the La Trobe University Medical Centre and La Trobe Private Hospital.

Bundoora also has sporting and recreation facilities such as an indoor pool, gyms, playing fields (including the Tony Sheehan Oval), and indoor stadiums. A-League franchise Melbourne City have constructed a $15 million training facility on the campus grounds. Prior to the construction of its new training facilities, the Essendon Football Club had trained at La Trobe University during the summer. Additionally the Sport Program exists to assist student athletes.

The university is also home to the Centre for Dialogue, an interdisciplinary research institution which delves into certain intercultural and inter-religious conflicts, both in the domestic setting and in international relations. In March 2009, the centre attracted controversy in hosting a lecture given by former Iranian President Mohammad Khatami (1997–2005). Khatami emphasised the importance of dialogue between civilizations, especially in relation to quelling misunderstandings between the Islamic world and the West. The Centre for Dialogue has also received attention for its leadership programme for young Muslims, implemented predominantly in Melbourne's northern suburbs.

==== Research and Development Park ====
The R&D Park opened in 1993, adjacent to the Melbourne (Bundoora) campus. Tenants include a branch of the Walter and Eliza Hall Institute of Medical Research, the Victorian State Forensic Centre, a Rio Tinto research centre, Victorian Environment Protection Authority (EPA), the Co-operative Research Centre for Vaccine Technology, CAVAL, AgriBio and the Technical Enterprise Centre (a business incubator for new ventures in information technology, biotechnology and the life sciences).

Under the leadership of Vice-Chancellors, Roger Parrish (acting), Brian Stoddart (Interim) and Paul Johnson, the world-leading agribiosciences research facility (Agribio) was established through a joint venture arrangement with the Victorian State Government by aggregating 11 primary industries research sites at the university.

Under Vice-Chancellor Paul Johnson's leadership a sports strategy and medical school bid were initiated, and sector record levels of Commonwealth Government funding were achieved (LIMS - institute of molecular science research, rural health facilities in Bendigo and new facilities of the Olga Tennyson Autism Research Centre). Melbourne Heart Football team relocated to the Bundoora Campus as part of the sports strategy. At this time, the university was also instrumental in establishing a Northern Mayor's Forum to lead strategic approaches to regional planning and a public transport strategy to improve the Bundoora Campus accessibility.

=== Melbourne (CBD) ===
La Trobe has a city campus in the Melbourne central business district, on Collins Street. The campus delivers postgraduate courses for both domestic and international students.

==== Bouverie Centre ====
The Bouverie Centre (first known as the Collins Street Clinic) was established as a clinical mental health service for children and adolescents. In 1956, the centre was renamed the Bouverie Clinic following its relocation from Collins Street, in the CBD of Melbourne to Bouverie Street, Carlton. The Bouverie Centre made the transition from a child psychiatric clinic to the first family therapy centre in Australia in the mid-1970s. In 2007 the Bouverie Centre moved into a $5 million, state government-funded, purpose-built building at 8 Gardiner Street, Brunswick.

La Trobe University took over the management of the Bouverie Centre from the Mental Health Branch of the Victorian Department of Human Services, and added to Bouverie's name the subtitle Victoria's Family Institute. In the decades that followed, the range of clinical academic courses offered by Bouverie expanded and to date, the Centre delivers a number of Graduate Certificate programs, including the Graduate Certificate in Narrative Therapy; a program specifically tailored for professionals working with people impacted by Acquired Brain Injury seeking to enhance their skill and confidence in working with families, and the nationally recognised Graduate Certificate in Family Therapy for Aboriginal and/or Torres Strait Islander Workers. The centre's Master's level program and higher degree research program are a regular feature on the academic calendar.

The Bouverie Centre has over 40 staff, with clinical staff typically working across a number of different service areas.

=== Regional and interstate campuses ===
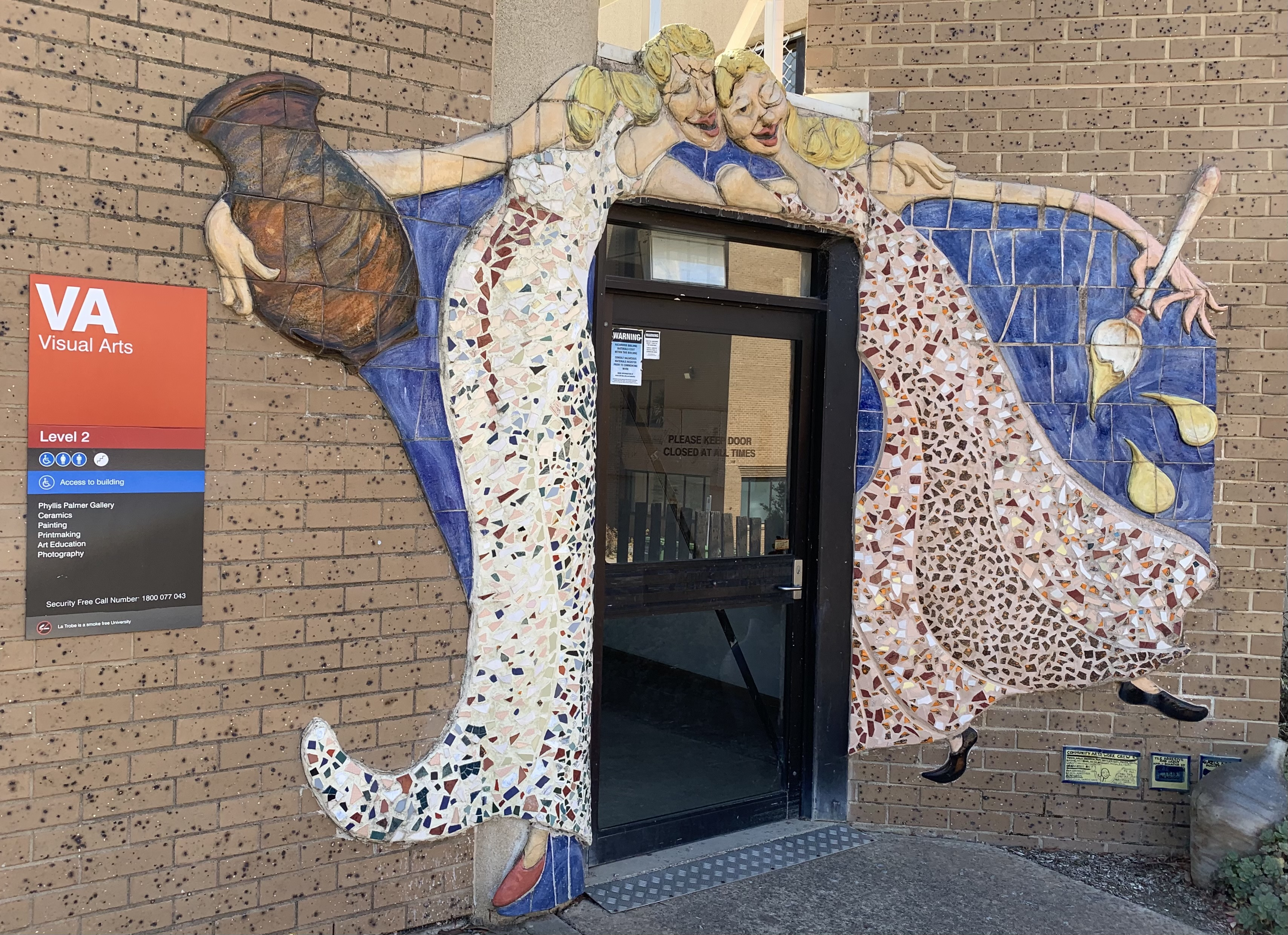
The Visual Arts Building at the Bendigo Campus

==== Bendigo ====
La Trobe Bendigo succeeded 118 years of tertiary education in the regional centre, which began with the Bendigo School of Mines in 1873.

La Trobe Bendigo was established in 1991, initially as the La Trobe University College of Northern Victoria (1991–1994). Between 1994 and 2005, La Trobe Bendigo's curriculum was operated by a multidisciplinary Faculty of Regional Development and was separate from that of Melbourne. Campuses could choose to offer individual courses from both Bundoora and Bendigo. This situation ceased in 2005 after the Bendigo campus was more tightly integrated into the Melbourne campus structure.

As of 2018 the Bendigo campus is situated on 33 ha (82 acres) of land, consisting of four sites—Edwards Road, Osbourne Street, the art centre and the La Trobe Rural Health School.

The main site of the Bendigo campus, near Edwards Road, was established in 1967 under the Bendigo Institute of Technology (1967–1976).

The Osbourne Street site was established in 1959 under the Bendigo Teacher's College (1926–73). It is now predominantly used for examination facilities and is home to the La Trobe University Bendigo Athletics Track. Some of the facilities used in the 2004 Commonwealth Youth Games were located at La Trobe University Bendigo. There is also the associated Central Victorian Innovation Park, located on university land, which opened in December 2003.

Together these two sites near Edwards Road and Osbourne Street form the Flora Hill campus precinct. They were acquired by La Trobe University in 1991 after an amalgamation with the Bendigo College of Advanced Education (1976–1991).

There are two schools and an art centre in Bendigo:

- La Trobe Rural Health School
- La Trobe Tech School
- The La Trobe Art Institute is a contemporary art centre comprising galleries, a studio for residencies, and venues for hire to the public. The Institute is responsible for the university's seven art collections across all of the Victorian campuses.

==== Albury–Wodonga ====
La Trobe University's Albury–Wodonga Campus is located three kilometres from the centre of Wodonga on a 26-hectare (64-acre) site. South of the Murray River, the campus is located in Victoria, but within 10 kilometres of the NSW town of Albury and within 20 kilometres of Charles Sturt University's NSW-based Albury–Wodonga campus.

La Trobe University's presence in Albury–Wodonga began in 1991, within the facilities of the Wodonga Institute of TAFE. The Albury-Wodonga campus continues to share various resources with Wodonga TAFE, including the David Mann Library. This campus houses the faculties of education, health sciences, biology, business as well as the John Richards Centre for Rural Ageing Research and the Centre for Freshwater Ecosystems.

In 2020, the university announced plans to shift almost half of the courses offered at the campus online, while guaranteeing the campus would remain open.

==== Mildura ====
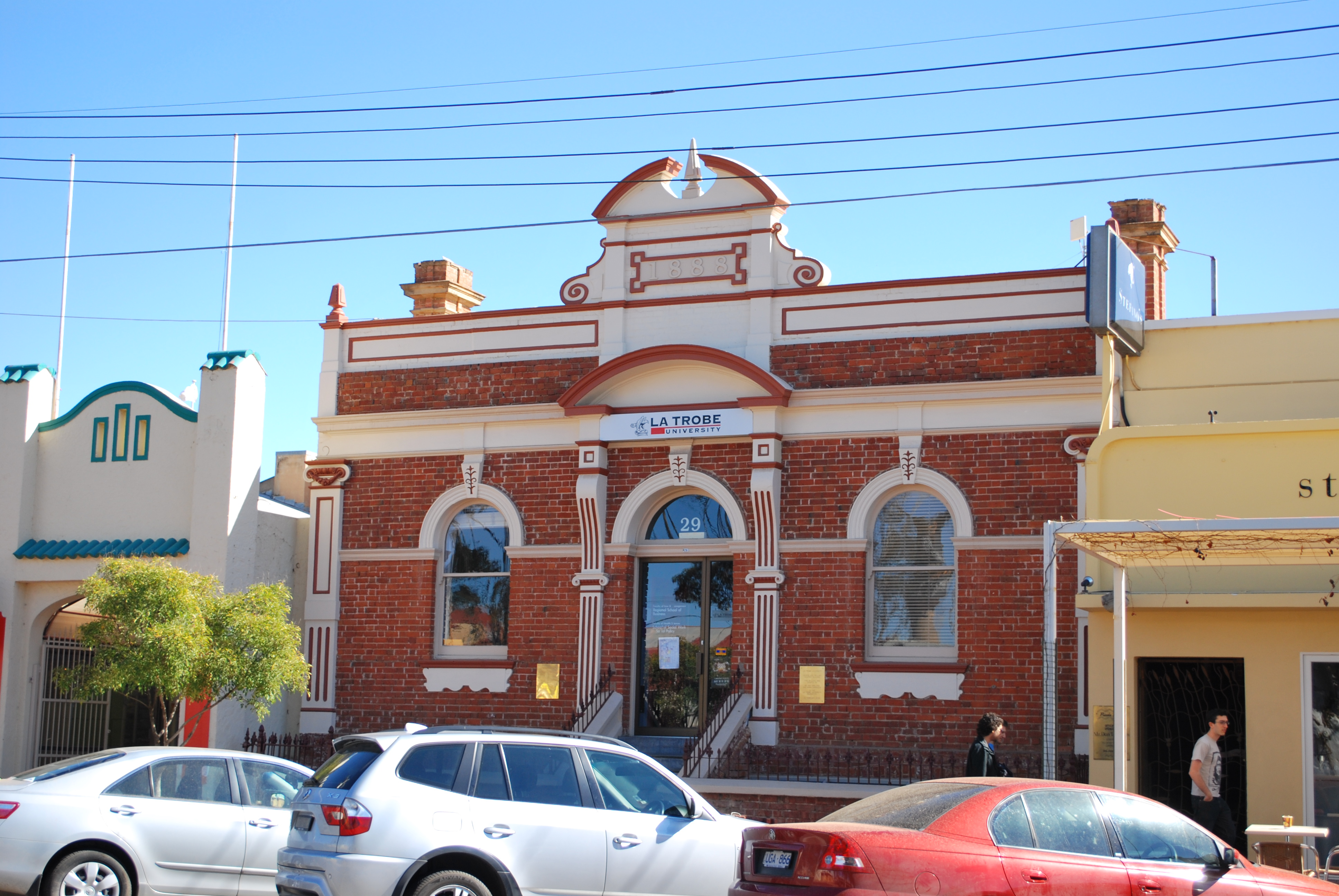
Mildura offices

The Mildura Campus was established in 1996, co-located with the main campus of the Sunraysia Institute of TAFE. These institutions and other tertiary education and research institutions on the site share various resources. A second Mildura City campus opened in 2006 in the old Mildura Cultivator offices, next to "Gallery 25", an art gallery which La Trobe became involved with a few years earlier.

==== Shepparton ====
The Shepparton campus was established in 1994. A new two-storey campus building at 210 Fryers Street, opposite the Goulburn Ovens Institute of TAFE was opened in late 2010. Originally the revamped campus building was meant to open in early 2008, but funding delays pushed the project back.

==== Sydney ====
Located at 255 Elizabeth Street, near Hyde Park, the Sydney campus is centrally located and offers courses in business, accounting and informational technologies, as well as some bridging and enabling courses.

==== Partnerships and the e-campus ====
In 2007, the university announced plans to open "learning nodes" co-located with the Wangaratta and Seymour campuses of Goulburn Ovens Institute of TAFE, and at the Swan Hill campus of Sunraysia Institute of TAFE.

La Trobe University also offers an "online" campus, where students can access and participate in classes online through the university's learning management system.

=== Former campuses ===
The Mount Buller campus of the University, which opened in 1997, closed at the end of 2006 due to low student numbers.

The Hotel and Conference Centre at Beechworth closed on 23 May 2011. This decision followed stakeholder consultation and feedback about the proposed closure from local businesses and the community. The Beechworth site was once home to the Beechworth Lunatic Asylum, founded in 1867 and later renamed "Mayday Hills Hospital". The hospital ceased operation in 1995.

== Governance and structure ==
=== University council ===
The principal governing body of the university is the university council. The council is composed of the chancellor, the vice-chancellor, the chair of the academic board, three persons elected by and from the staff of the university, two persons elected by and from the enrolled students of the university, six persons appointed by the governor in council, one person appointed by the minister administering the act and six other persons appointed by the council.

==== Chancellor and vice-chancellor ====
The current chancellor and chair of the university council is John Brumby, since 29 March 2019.

The vice-chancellor is the chief executive officer of the university (Section 26 of the act) and is responsible to the council for the discharge of his or her powers, functions and duties. Theo Farrell was appointed to a 12-year term as vice-chancellor in February 2024. Farrell is a leading scholar of the Afghan and previously acted as strategic advisor to the UK government, the US-led command in Kabul and participated in track II peace talks with the Taliban. John Dewar, former provost of the University of Melbourne, was vice-chancellor of La Trobe University from January 2012 to January 2024. Dewar is an internationally known family law specialist and researcher.

=== Constituent schools ===
The university is made up of 10 schools, offering courses at all levels:

- School of Agriculture, Biomedicine and Environment
- School of Allied Health, Human Services and Sport
- School of Business
- School of Computing, Engineering and Mathematical Sciences
- School of Education
- School of Humanities and Social Sciences
- School of Law
- School of Nursing and Midwifery
- School of Psychology and Public Health
- La Trobe Rural Health School

== Academic profile ==
La Trobe University is a member of the Innovative Research Universities, an Australian group that collectively receives over $340 million in research grants.

La Trobe University has been confirmed as one of Australia's leading research universities, climbing to third in Victoria, based on the Excellence in Research Australia (ERA) 2012 report. La Trobe is the top ranked institution in the nation for research in microbiology and equal top with just one other university in biochemistry and cell biology and in veterinary sciences. Historical studies and archaeology were also both assessed at the top ranking.

The ERA 2012 report shows La Trobe University has made very significant improvements over the past two years, with the number of fields of research in specific disciplines rated at world standard or above (ERA 3 – 5) rising by 31 per cent, from 29 to 38 in 2012. The increase in the publications rated at 'well above' world standard has increased from about 400 to about 1800, which is more than 300%.

The results are in line with the research investment strategy in research physical infrastructure such as the LIMS and AgriBio projects, and will inform further development of research concentration. This will be important to ensure further improvement in research quality and output in the university in line with the strategic plan.

In August 2019, the university announced the "Shah Rukh Khan La Trobe University PhD Scholarship," which would provide an opportunity for a female researcher from India to contribute to her field via a four-year PhD degree in one of the following fields: health, sport, information technology, cyber security or engineering. Khan's Meer Foundation, which supports and empowers Women, is in recognition of the scholarship, which will provide an estimated $200,000 (AUD) worth of support to the student for a four-year research stay at La Trobe's Melbourne campus.

=== Research and publications ===
The 2018 Excellence in Research for Australia (ERA) report found that La Trobe's research was rated 'At world standard', 'Above world standard' or 'Well above world standard' across all broad and detailed disciplinary areas.

=== Research divisions ===
==== La Trobe Institute for Molecular Science ====
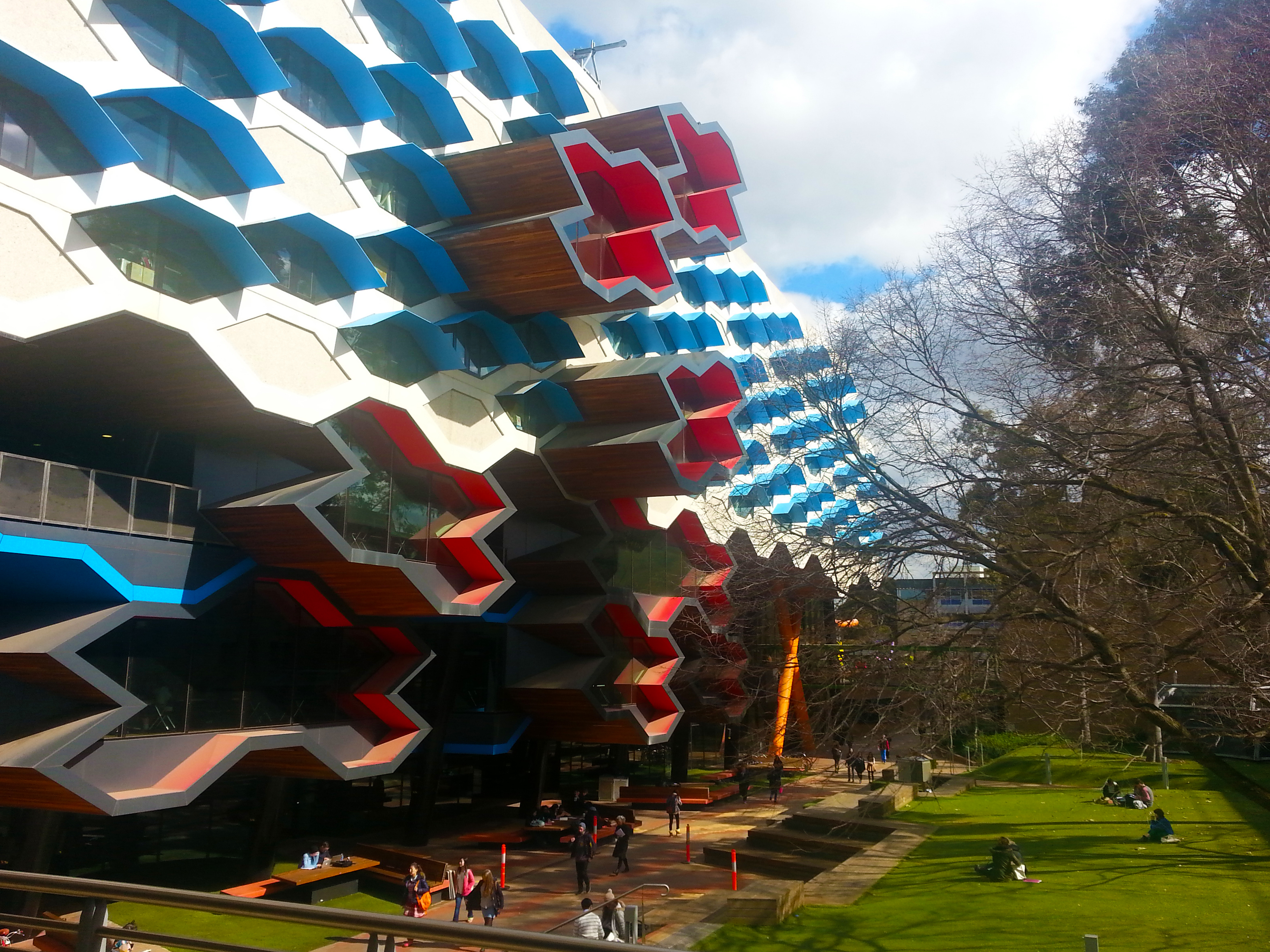
Molecular inspired windows at LIMS

The La Trobe Institute for Molecular Science (LIMS) is an interdisciplinary research institute based at the university. It contains research groups in life sciences (biochemistry and genetics), physical sciences (chemistry and physics), and applied sciences (pharmacy) and teaches undergraduate and graduate courses in these areas through the School of Molecular Sciences. It also contains two biotech companies: Hexima and AdAlta. The institute is housed in three buildings: LIMS1 and LIMS2 in the centre of the university's main campus in Bundoora and the applied science building at the Bendigo campus.

Funding for the initiative was achieved under the leadership of Vice-Chancellor Paul Johnson through sector record levels of Commonwealth Government funding for LIMS and rural health facilities in Bendigo).

==== Centre for Research on Language Diversity ====
The Centre for Research on Language Diversity is a research institute founded in 1998 by R. M. W. Dixon at the Australian National University under the name Research Centre for Linguistic Typology. It moved to La Trobe University in 2000.

=== Research facilities ===
==== AgriBio ====
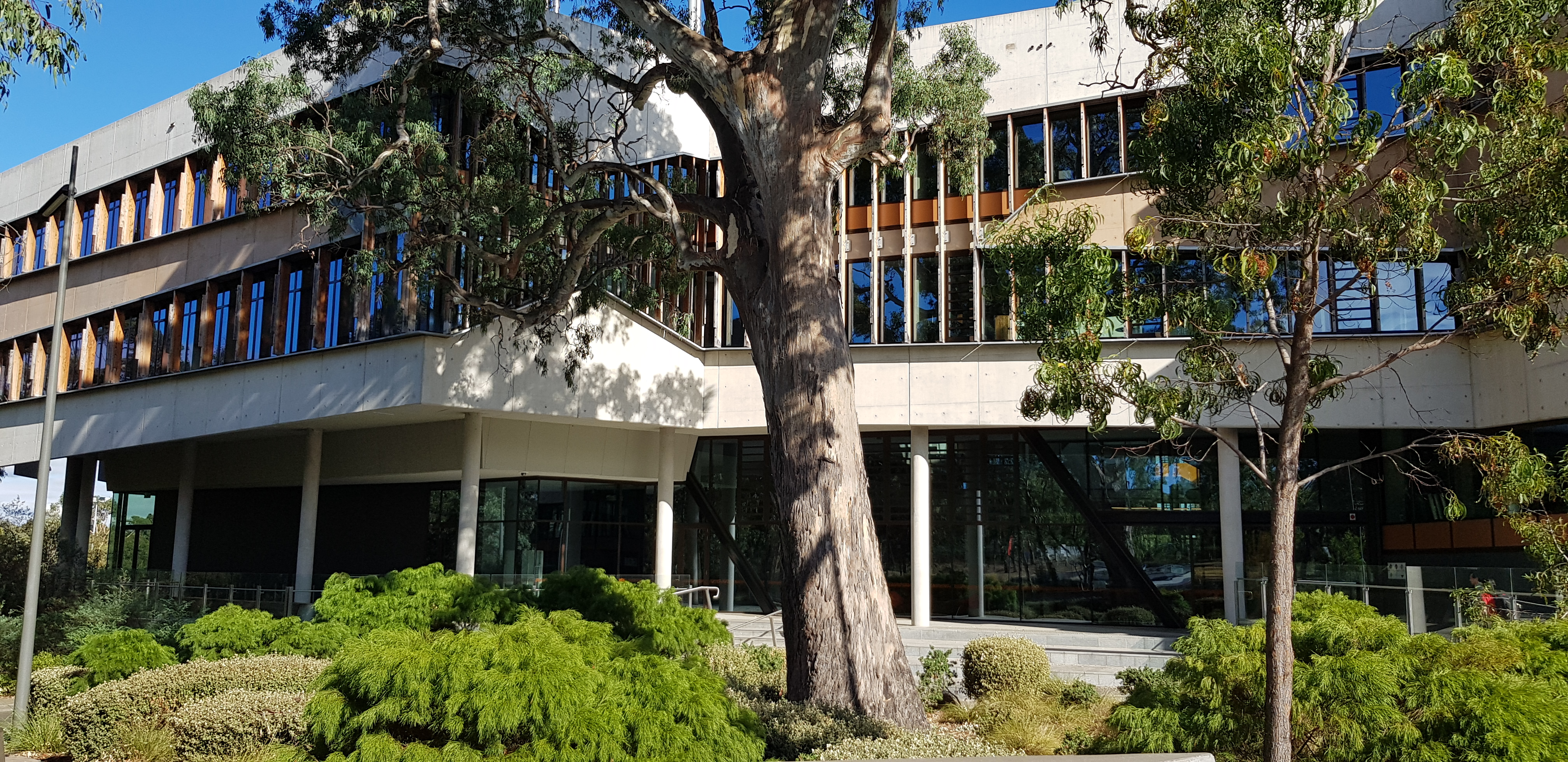
Agribio building

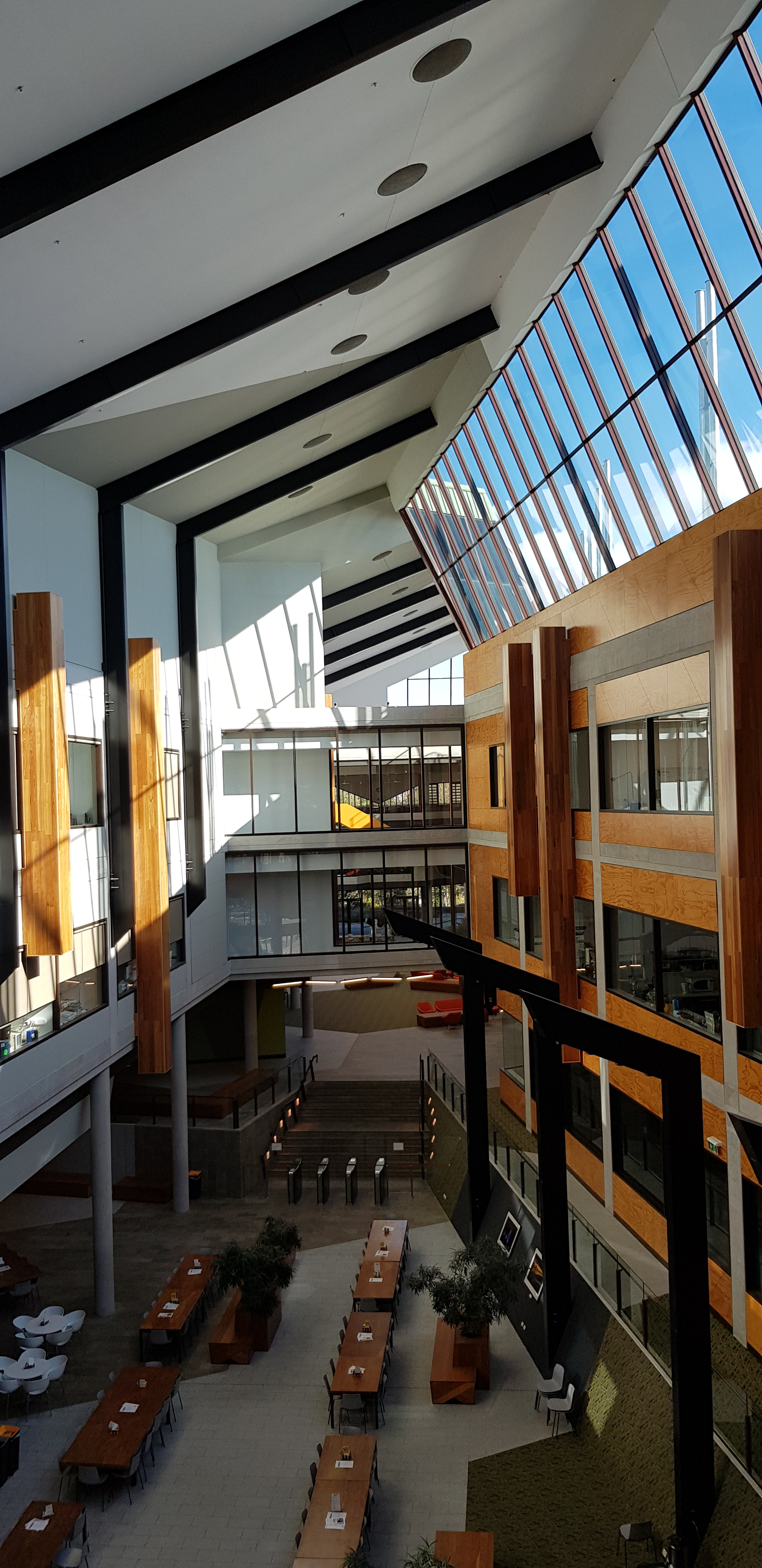
Agribio Atrium

In 2004 the Victorian Government identified a need to collocate its primary industries department's plant and animal science research capabilities with other research entities. It committed funds for this purpose in 2005 and committed to a joint venture with La Trobe University to construct a bioscience research centre at its Bundoora campus. A key objective of AgriBio is to facilitate science collaboration between the university and the Department of Environment, Land, Water and Planning (previously DEPI).

Under the leadership of Vice-Chancellors, Roger Parrish (acting), Brian Stoddart (Interim) and Paul Johnson, the world-leading agribiosciences research facility (Agribio) was established through a joint venture arrangement with the Victorian State Government by aggregating 11 primary industries research sites at the university.

The La Trobe AgriBio building, on the south eastern side of the university, has grown into a structure of around 31,000 square metres and over three levels with a number of external buildings under construction such as a large glasshouse and poly-house complex. Construction commenced in May 2009 and was completed in August 2012.

==== Australian Archaeomagnetism Laboratory ====
In 2011 the university, in conjunction with the Faculty of Humanities and Social Sciences built the Australian Archaeomagnetism Laboratory (TAAL), based within the Department of Archaeology, Environment and Community Planning. The main aim and focus of research in the laboratory is promoting the use of magnetic methods of analysis (palaeomagnetism, rock magnetism, archaeomagnetic dating and magnetostratigraphy) for understanding the age, palaeoenvironmental/climate context and site formation history of archaeological and fossil sites. The laboratory also undertakes other research with the Department of Physics, including comparative work at the Australian Synchrotron.

In 2011 the laboratory was involved in dating the age of the new South African hominin species Australopithecus sediba, which was published in the journal "Science".

=== Galleries and collections ===
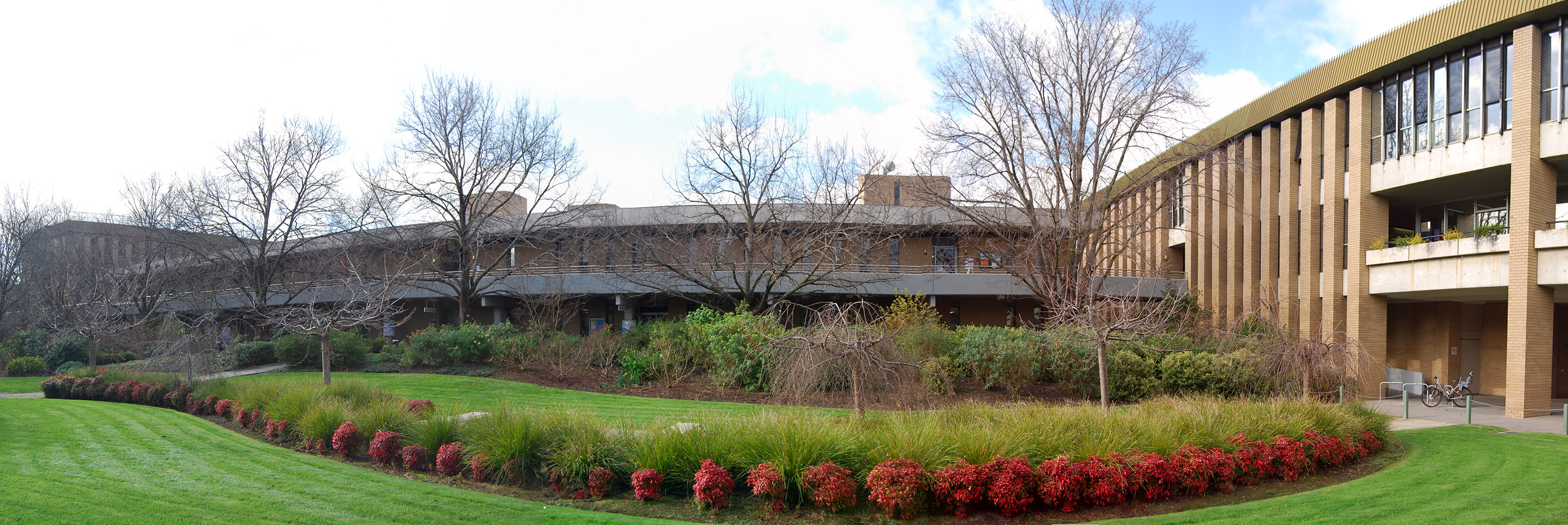
David Myers Building

La Trobe began collecting artworks in the early 1960s before beginning construction on the main campus at Bundoora. Master architect of La Trobe Roy Simpson initiated the commissioning of paintings to establish the art collection, and large sculptures were included in the original design. The collection was established at the Melbourne (Bundoora) campus in 1967, and from the late 1970s, various exhibition spaces came and went. In 2010 the Melbourne collection consisted of more than 3000 post-war contemporary Australian artworks valued at $17 million; the second largest university art collection in Victoria in terms of collection value.

The La Trobe University Museum of Art (LUMA), which was located at Glenn College, Melbourne campus, from 1990 to 2016, managed the University Art Collection. It hosted exhibitions, managed the sculpture park (which includes a controversial upside-down statue of Governor La Trobe by sculptor Charles Robb) was managed by LUMA., and collaborated with significant state, national and international projects.

The Visual Arts Centre (VAC) opened in 2005 at 121 View Street, Bendigo. It held public lectures, hosted artist residencies and exhibited cutting-edge work in the visual arts. The Phyllis Palmer Gallery was also situated at Bendigo.

==== La Trobe Institute ====
As of 2021, the university's collection is managed by the La Trobe Institute (LAI), which was established in 2013 to build upon and rationalise the existing university framework of art collections and activities. In 2016 LAI assumed responsibility for LUMA and VAC, which were fully integrated into the LAI structure in 2017. It is based at the old VAC location, but is also active on all of the university campuses, participating in various collaborative projects

The LAI acquires the winning work in the Australian Muslim Artists Art Prize each year, since the university entered into an educational partnership with the Islamic Museum of Australia, which included sponsoring the prize as well as the possibility of providing training in Islamic cultures for teachers, adding a new component to journalism courses and "work-integrated learning opportunities".

=== Academic reputation ===
University rankings

Global – Overall
- ARWU World: 301–400 (2025)
- CWTS World: 458 (Note: The CWTS Leiden Ranking is based on P (top 10%).) (2024)
- QS World: =233 (2026)
- QS Employability: 301–500 (2022)
- THE World: 251–300 (2026)
- USNWR Global: =278 (25/26)

National – Overall
- ARWU National: 14–20 (2025)
- CWTS National: 19 (2024)
- ERA National: 17 (2018)
- QS National: 17 (2026)
- THE National: 14–20 (2026)
- USNWR National: =19 (25/26)
- AFR National: =22 (2025)

In the 2024 Aggregate Ranking of Top Universities, which measures aggregate performance across the QS, THE and ARWU rankings, the university attained a position of #235 (16th nationally).

National publications

In the Australian Financial Review Best Universities Ranking 2025, the university was tied #22 amongst Australian universities.

Global publications

In the 2026 Quacquarelli Symonds World University Rankings (published 2025), the university attained a tied position of #233 (17th nationally).

In the Times Higher Education World University Rankings 2026 (published 2025), the university attained a position of #251–300 (tied 14–20th nationally).

In the 2025 Academic Ranking of World Universities, the university attained a position of #301–400 (tied 14–20th nationally).

In the 2025–2026 U.S. News & World Report Best Global Universities, the university attained a tied position of #278 (tied 19th nationally).

In the CWTS Leiden Ranking 2024, the university attained a position of #458 (19th nationally).

=== Student outcomes ===
The Australian Government's QILT (Note: Abbreviation for Quality Indicators for Learning and Teaching.) conducts national surveys documenting the student life cycle from enrolment through to employment. These surveys place more emphasis on criteria such as student experience, graduate outcomes and employer satisfaction than perceived reputation, research output and citation counts.

In the 2023 Employer Satisfaction Survey, graduates of the university had an overall employer satisfaction rate of 85.9%.

In the 2023 Graduate Outcomes Survey, graduates of the university had a full-time employment rate of 78.5% for undergraduates and 89.2% for postgraduates. The initial full-time salary was A$69,400 for undergraduates and A$90,000 for postgraduates.

In the 2023 Student Experience Survey, undergraduates at the university rated the quality of their entire educational experience at 73.8% meanwhile postgraduates rated their overall education experience at 78.2%.

== Student life ==
=== Student union ===
The former La Trobe University Students' Union was responsible for the Eagle Bar (previously just Uni Bar), Contact Student Services but its role has been considerably diminished as a consequence of Voluntary Student Unionism. Uni Bar was the first licensed bar on an Australian university. Thursday 'bar nights' were well attended by residential college students. By 1990 it opened every day at 1pm with regular musical acts throughout academic months and even an annual "Battle of the Bands" competition.

There used to be three main student representative bodies on campus known as the La Trobe University Student Guild, the Student's Representative Council and the La Trobe Postgraduate Student's Association. The La Trobe University Student Representative Council, became the principal representative body on campus and a student advocacy group as well as student representatives for welfare, disability, women, queer, indigenous, environment, education and welfare and the Guild managed student services. In 2011 however, the Student's Representative Council, the La Trobe Postgraduate Students Association, the Students Guild and the university merged the three separate organisations into one body: the La Trobe Student Union.

The largest faculty-based student representative organisation on campus is the Law Students Association (LSA). Postgraduate students are represented in the new union. The students at the Bendigo campus are represented by the Bendigo Student Association (BSA), a much less activist and political organisation than the student union. The BSA publishes the 3rd Degree magazine.

=== Student newspaper ===
Rabelais Student Media was a student newspaper at La Trobe University, named after French Renaissance writer François Rabelais. Rabelais was founded in 1967 and originally run as a department of the La Trobe University Student Representative Council (subsequently by the former La Trobe Student Union). The paper was funded by a combination of advertising revenue and a student levy. Editors were elected annually and serve for a single year. In 2021, Rabelais discontinued publishing physical magazine copies due to funding cuts to the La Trobe Student Union.

Notably, Rabelais was the subject of a Federal Court case after the Office of Film and Literature Classification ruled in 1995 that it "promotes, incites and instructs in matters of crime" because of an article on shoplifting (reprinted from elsewhere). This decision was later reviewed by the High Court of Australia.

=== Sports and athletics ===
La Trobe University is one of 36 universities across Australia that is part of the Elite Athlete Friendly University Network. The network was established by the Australian Sports Commission in 2004 to identify, promote and support the specific needs of university students who participate in sport at an elite level. As a result, an Elite Athlete Friendly University (EAFU) program was developed and formulated.

In 2011 La Trobe University was the reigning champion at the Southern University Games, having won the competition in 2010.

The Sports Centre at the Melbourne campus has a fully equipped gym, squash/racquetball and tennis courts, volleyball, badminton, indoor soccer, netball and basketball courts, a 25-metre pool with a deep water pit, and dance and yoga studios. The centre also offers group exercise classes, dance classes, pilates and yoga. Tuition in most sports can be arranged and courts can be hired to students at discounted rates. The centre also offers deep tissue and trigger point sports massage. La Trobe University participates in the annual Australian University Games A-League association football (soccer) club Melbourne City have their training and administrative facilities based at La Trobe University.

==== Fight song ====
The university song is the tune of Marche Henri IV. The melody is originally from Cassandre by Thoinot Arbeau. There are many university chants that are sung at matches which vary between the sports clubs. The most common chant that is used by La Trobe teams is "LT Who? LTU!".

Other student-run activities include the La Trobe International Relations Associations.

=== Residential colleges ===
The following colleges and halls are based at the Melbourne (Bundoora) campus:

- Chisholm College (undergraduate)
- Glenn College (undergraduate)
- Menzies College (undergraduate)
- University Lodge (postgraduate and mature-age)
- Graduate House (graduate and mature-age)

== Controversies ==
=== Swisse Research Partnership ===
In 2014, La Trobe University faced significant backlash and intense scrutiny over a proposed $15 million, six-year funding deal with vitamin manufacturer Swisse Wellness to establish a Complementary Medicines Evaluation Centre. (https://theconversation.com/academics-back-professor-over-swisse-research-collaboration-22815) Groups like the Friends of Science in Medicine also criticised the partnership, warning that it could damage the university's academic credibility. (https://theconversation.com/academics-back-professor-over-swisse-research-collaboration-22815). Public health expert and consumer advocate Dr. Ken Harvey resigned from his position at the university. He cited severe conflicts of interest, arguing that industry funding could bias researchers to produce positive results. (https://www.abc.net.au/news/2014-02-05/academic-quits-la-trobe-university-over-2415m-contract-with-sw/5239204)

=== Safe Schools Program ===
Roz Ward, an academic at the university's Australian Research Centre in Sex, Health and Society (ARCSHS), co-founded a Safe Schools program for Victoria. The program aims to reduce homophobic and transphobic bullying and discrimination in schools. Research work undertaken by ARCSHS into same-sex attracted and gender diverse youth has helped underpin the program. This program has created controversy. At a national symposium, Ward said, "When people do complain then school leadership can very calmly and graciously say, 'You know what? We're doing it anyway, tough luck'! . . .'(It's) not about celebrating diversity; not about stopping bullying, (It's) about gender and sexual diversity". The Australian Christian Lobby (ACL) and others have criticised the program as "radical sexual experimentation" which "exposed students to extreme material" and asked for the withdrawal of $8 million allocated to the Australia-wide program. ACL says the program instructs students how to use facilities that match gender identities, how to have anal sex and how girls can bind their chests to change gender.

On 16 March 2016, ABC news reported that a Liberal Nationals MP, George Christensen, had used parliamentary privilege to accuse the Safe Schools program of being linked to a "paedophilia advocate", referring to a professor, Gary Dowsett, and a report he published in 1982. A spokesman for La Trobe University stated: "We are appalled that a respected academic has been attacked using parliamentary privilege. This is a blatant attempt to distract attention from the independent endorsement of the highly effective Safe Schools program. We stand by the important work of Professor Dowsett and his team."

In May 2016, the Victorian Government reignited its feud with Canberra over the controversial Safe Schools program, announcing it will publicly provide material about sexual diversity that had been deleted from the federal government's website, and an additional $300,000 a year to deliver the program in full.

A children's story book, promoted by the Safe Schools Coalition, released in January 2016 and titled The Gender Fairy, explains transgender issues for children as young as four. Ward compiled the accompanying notes for teachers and parents.

Ward was suspended in June 2016 over comments she made about the Australian flag in a Facebook post, amid concerns her comments had the potential to inflame opinion about the Safe Schools program. The suspension was soon lifted, along with a statement: "La Trobe said it was not in the university's best interest to pursue the matter, but that it followed the proper procedures to suspend Ms Ward."

=== Sexual assault and abuse ===
In 2017 La Trobe was reported as the worst university in Victoria for sexual harassment according to the Australian Human Rights Commission's national survey on campus abuse. Of the 947 La Trobe students surveyed, 30% stated they had been sexually harassed at university. Under a previous 2016 FOI request, the university had stated there were only 7 officially reported cases of sexual assault, harassment or misconduct on campus, resulting in no expulsions and no suspensions over the previous five years.

=== Bendigo Writers Festival ===
La Trobe University is a major sponsor of the annual Bendigo Writers Festival, and attracted controversy in 2025 after a consortium of Jewish academics wrote to the university with concerns over an event on that year's festival program. This event featured a panel with Palestinian Australian writer Randa Abdel-Fattah, and the university allegedly pressured the festival organiser, the City of Greater Bendigo Council, to insist it impose a code of conduct, including a contested Universities Australia definition of antisemitism, on festival participants. Amid widespread criticism and concerns over freedom of speech, the resulting Bendigo Writers Festival boycott saw more than 50 writers and hosts withdrawing from the festival, and its opening night gala and closing ceremony were cancelled.

== See also ==
- List of universities in Australia
- Centre for Dialogue
