= Zouave =

Class of light infantry regiments of the French Army

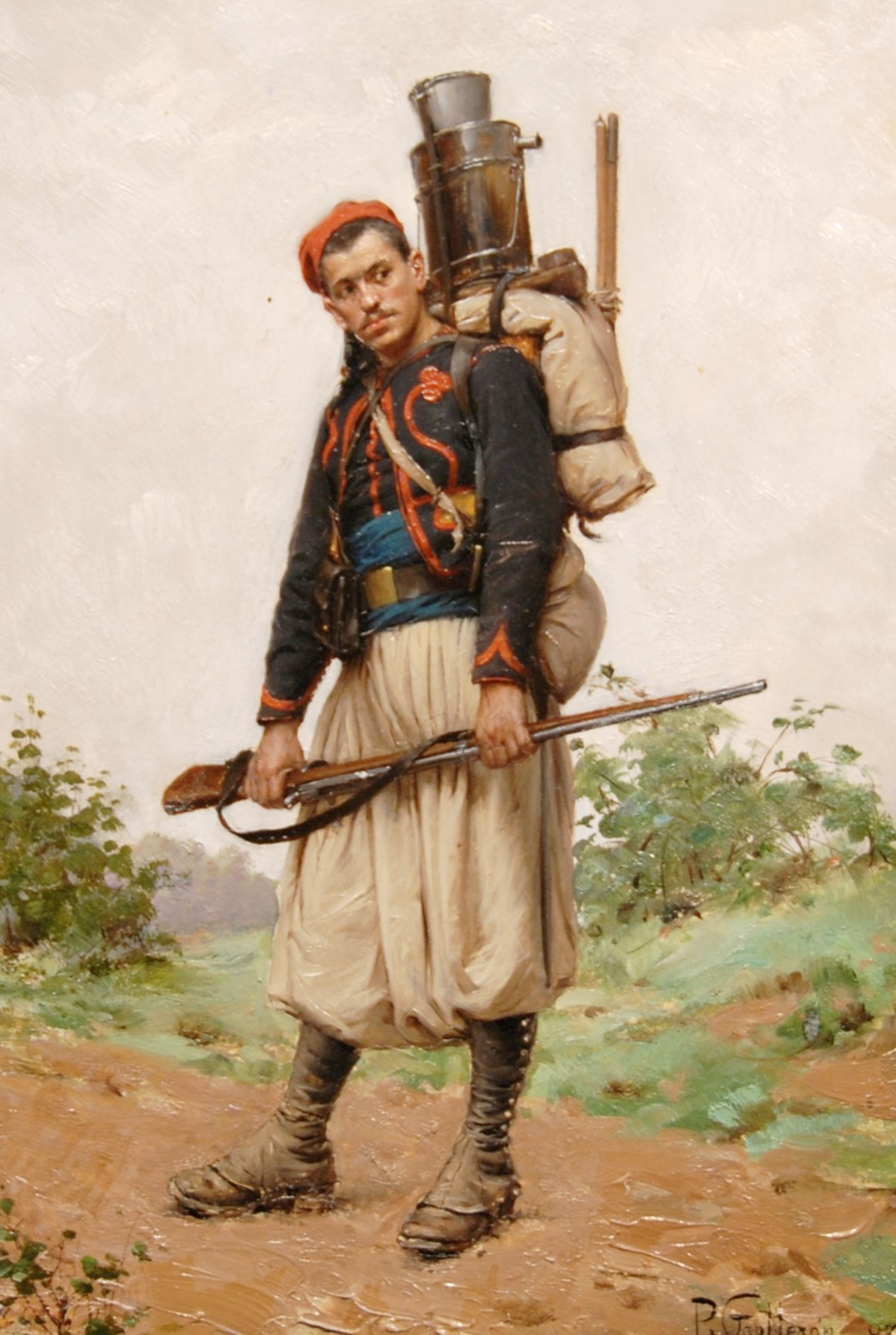
French zouave, c. 1870

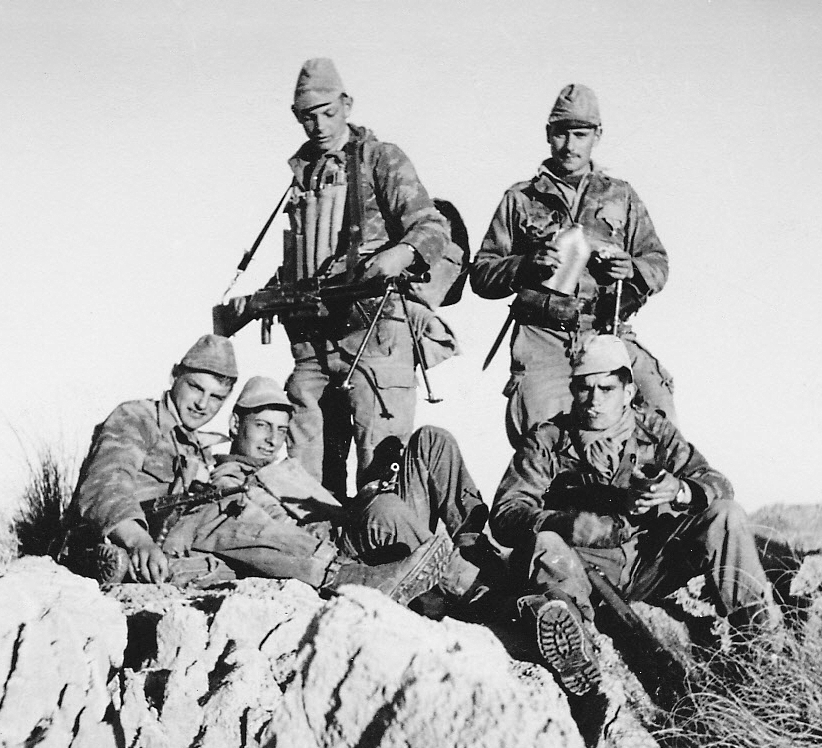
A small detachment of France's 4th Regiment of Zouaves in the M'Sila region during the Algerian War, c. 1961

The Zouaves (French pronunciation: [zwav]) were a class of light infantry regiments of the French Army and other units modelled on it, which served between 1830 and 1962, mainly in French North Africa. The zouaves were among the most decorated units of the French Army.

The Zouave corps was created during the conquest of Algeria in 1830 by recruiting men from the local population. However, faced with the patchy results of indigenous recruitment in battle and frequent desertions, the French Army opted for ethnically mixed units the following year; the corps thus began to integrate both Frenchmen and locals. From 1842 onwards, the men recruited to serve in the Zouave units were exclusively French or people of French descent born in French Algeria (pieds-noirs), a policy which continued until the dissolution of all Zouave regiments after the Algerian War.

The name of the Zouave corps is inspired by the Zwawa group of tribes in Algeria ("Zwawa" being the origin of the French term zouave) who had gained a martial reputation fighting for local rulers under the Regency of Algiers. Unlike the Dey's battalion, the regiments formed by the French from 1830 onward included few Kabyles and had a more diverse indigenous recruitment (Arabs, Turks, Moors, etc.).

In the 1860s, zouave units arose in many other countries. The Papal Zouaves were organized by Louis Juchault de Lamoricière, a former commander of North African zouaves, while a former zouave sergeant, François Rochebrune, organized the Polish Zouaves of Death who fought against Russia in the January Uprising of 1863–1864. In the 1870s, former Papal Zouaves formed the cadre for a short-lived Spanish zouave unit. The "zouave" title was also used by Brazilian units of black volunteers in the Paraguayan War, possibly due to a perceived link with Africa.

In the United States, zouaves were brought to public attention by Elmer E. Ellsworth, who created and ran a drill company called the "Zouave Cadets". The drill company toured nationally. Zouave units were then raised on both sides of the American Civil War, including a regiment under Ellsworth's command: the 11th New York Infantry known as the New York "Fire Zouaves". These units were composed of local American soldiers rather than North Africans, but drew their inspiration and dress from the French zouaves.

The distinctive uniforms of French and other zouave units was of North African origin. It generally included short open-fronted jackets, baggy trousers (serouel), sashes, and a fez-like chéchia head-dress.

== Etymology ==
The Zouaoua had formerly provided soldiers for the deys of Algiers and in August 1830 the commander of the French expeditionary force which had occupied the city recommended their continued employment in this role. The word "zouave" (French pronunciation: [zwav]) is a French language derivative of Zouaouas, a tribe of Berbers located in the mountains of the Jurjura Range (see Kabyles). But although this French army corps bears the name of an old army corps of the dey composed of Kabyles (zwawa), this is misleading because the Kabyles constituted only a small part of the recruitment of the French Zouaves in 1830. In the battalions formed in Algiers, there were a large number of Arabs; natives of the plain, Kouloughlis, and Moors who participated in the new formation.

== Zouave units in French service ==
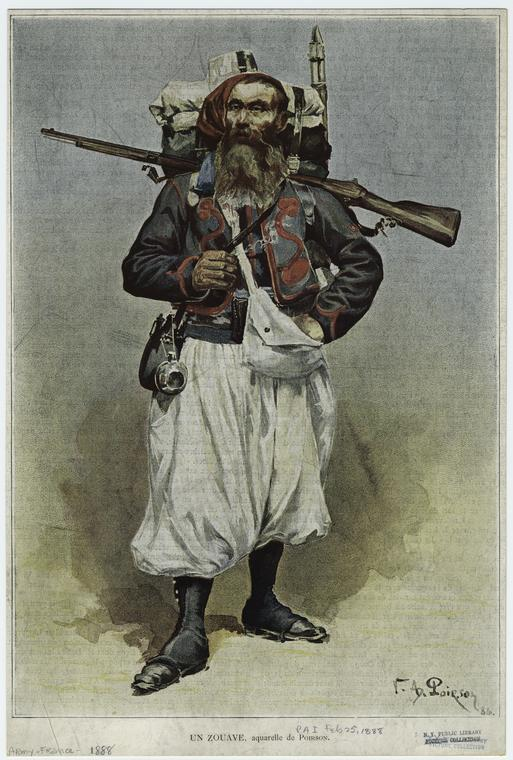
A French zouave from 1888 wearing white summer serouel trousers instead of the usual red

=== Recruitment ===
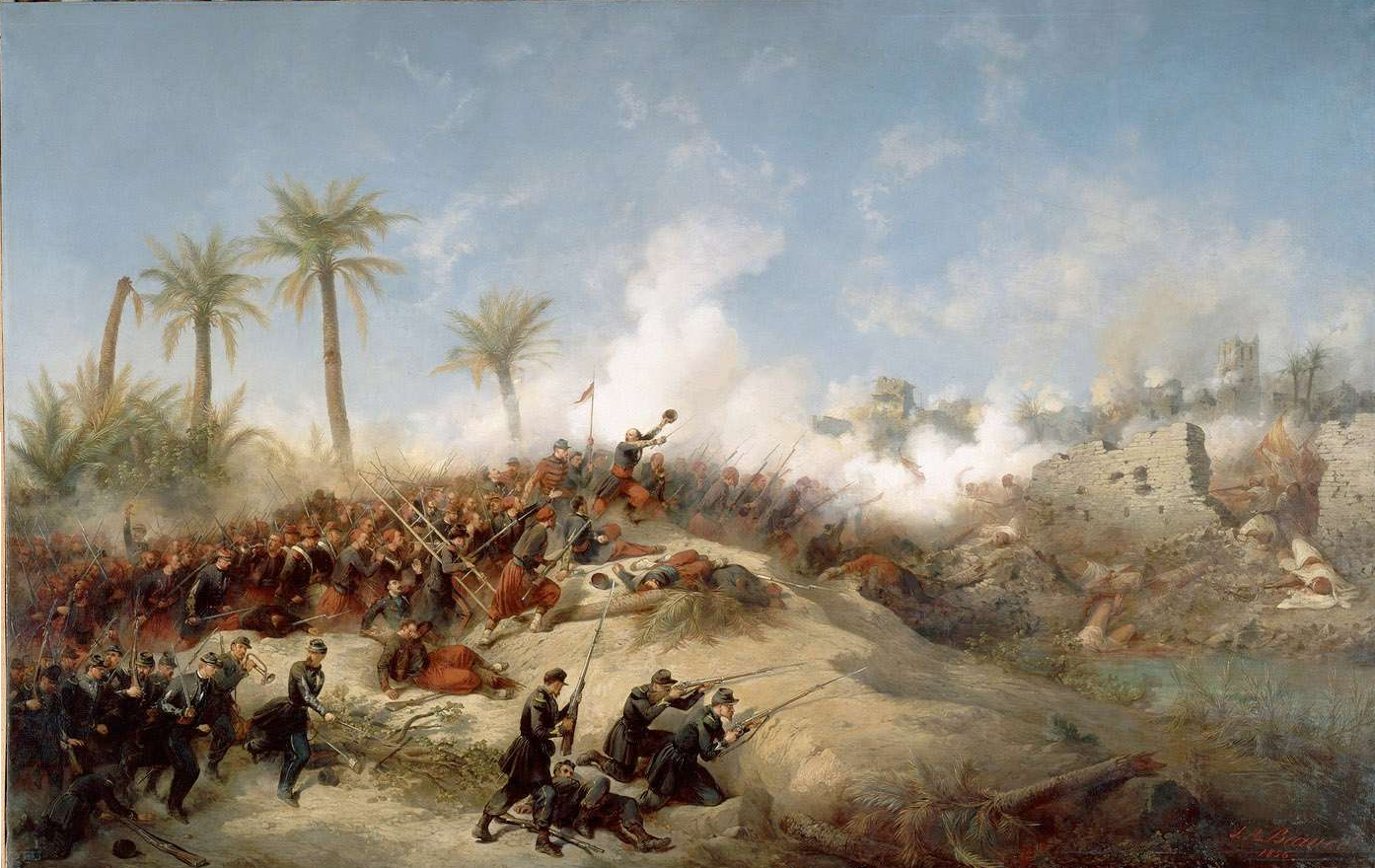
The Assault on Zaatcha by Jean-Adolphe Beaucé. Zouaves at the Battle of Zaatcha during the Conquest of Algeria

The existence of the new corps was formally recognised by a Royal decree dated 21 March 1831.

Recruitment was diverse; initially, 404 men, soldiers and officers, were recruited from among the local population: Turks, Black people, individuals from Blida, Kabylia, Tunis, and Morocco, and four or five Spaniards. This local recruitment quickly dwindled: in December 1832, out of a total of 477 men, 400 were absent from the second battalion. The situation was hardly better for the first battalion, which was short 237 men who would not be recruited six months after its formation. Of the first 100 native recruits, only 53 were still present on December 31, 1830. In 1831, 22 of those who remained deserted. Over 15 months, 46% of the force had deserted. Battalion commanders, depending on their personalities, attempted different approaches to address this problem: the first, Commandant Kolb, tried to "Frenchify the Arabs," while Commandant Duvivier tried to "become Arab" and made himself familiar with the Arabic language to connect with his troops. From 1833 onwards, Zouave battalions included European recruits; by 1835, while native recruitment remained high in absolute numbers, it decreased in relative terms due to a greater recruitment of Europeans.

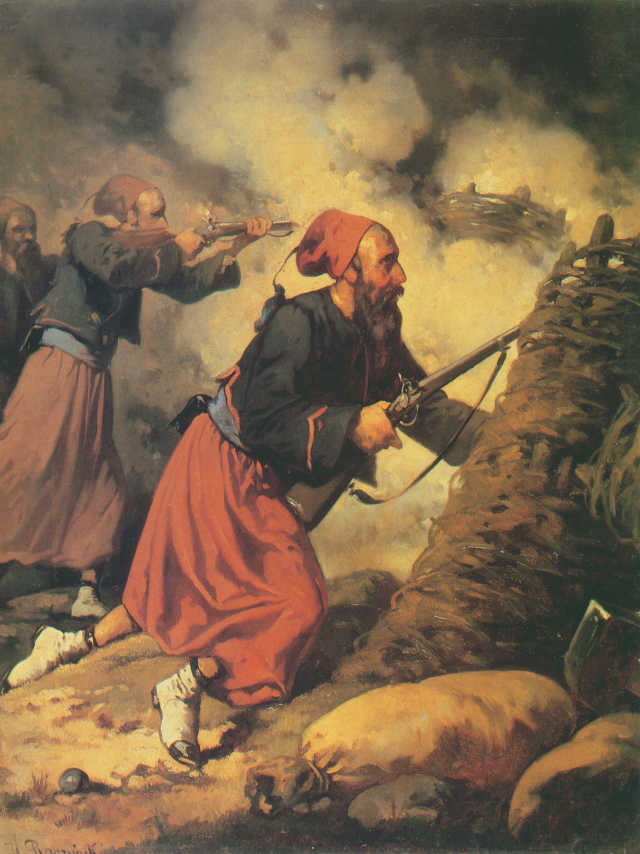
French zouaves during the Crimean War; painting by Aleksander Raczyński (1858)

From their beginning the zouave units included a French European element, initially drawn from the demobilized Garde royal of Charles X and other Parisian volunteers. From March 1833 each zouave battalion was organised into ten companies, of which eight were Muslim Berbers and Arabs and two French. In 1838 a third battalion was raised, and the regiment thus formed was commanded by Major de Lamoriciere. Shortly afterwards the formation of the Tirailleurs algériens, the Turcos, as the infantry corps for Muslim troops, changed the basis for enlistment of the zouave battalions. From 1842 onwards, the recruitment of the Zouaves became exclusively European and Jewish.

For most of their remaining history the zouaves became an essentially French body, until in 1956 a new policy of partial racial mixing was introduced amongst units of the Army of Africa.

=== Zouave regiments ===
Initially constituted as battalion sized units, the zouaves were reorganized as separate regiments in 1852:

- The 1st Zouaves were linked to Algiers and central Algeria. The 1st Zouaves had a continuous existence from 1852 to 1949. After disbandment the regiment was recreated between 1956 and 1960
- The 2nd Zouaves were linked to Oran and western Algeria, 1852–1962
- The 3rd Zouaves were linked to Constantine and eastern Algeria, 1852–1962
- The 4th Zouaves were linked to Tunis and Tunisia. They were first formed as the Zouaves of the Imperial Guard in 1854, and became the 4th Zouves on the establishment of the Third Republic in 1870. They remained in existence under this title until 1962.

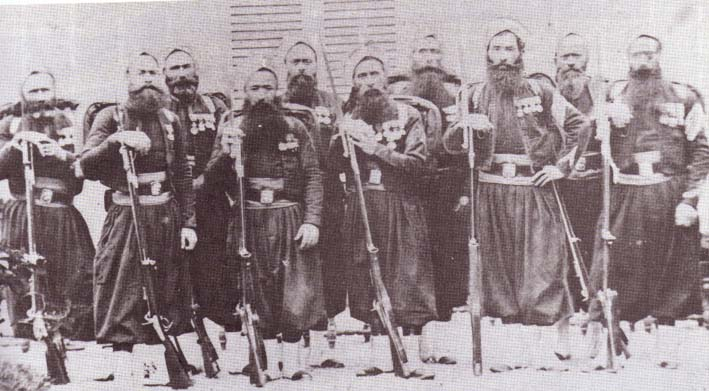
Guard Zouaves (Zouaves de la Garde) during the Second Italian War of Independence in 1859.

At the end of the Algerian War six zouave regiments were in existence, of which the 1er was disbanded in 1960 and the remainder in 1962.

Other provisional regiments of zouaves were raised in 1914 and 1939 for the First and Second World Wars respectively. During World War I nine regiments de marche of zouaves were created; comprising active, reserve, and new battalions seconded from other regiments. In World War II the number reached fourteen.

The zouave regiments raised in 1914 for the First World War were the 8th and 9th. The 13th Zouaves were raised in 1919 and dissolved in 1940. The zouave regiments raised in 1939 for the Second World War were the 11th, 12th, 14th, and 21st, all of which were dissolved after the fall of France in 1940. Other regiments raised later in the Second World War were the 9th ('reactivated'), 22nd, 23rd, and 29th.

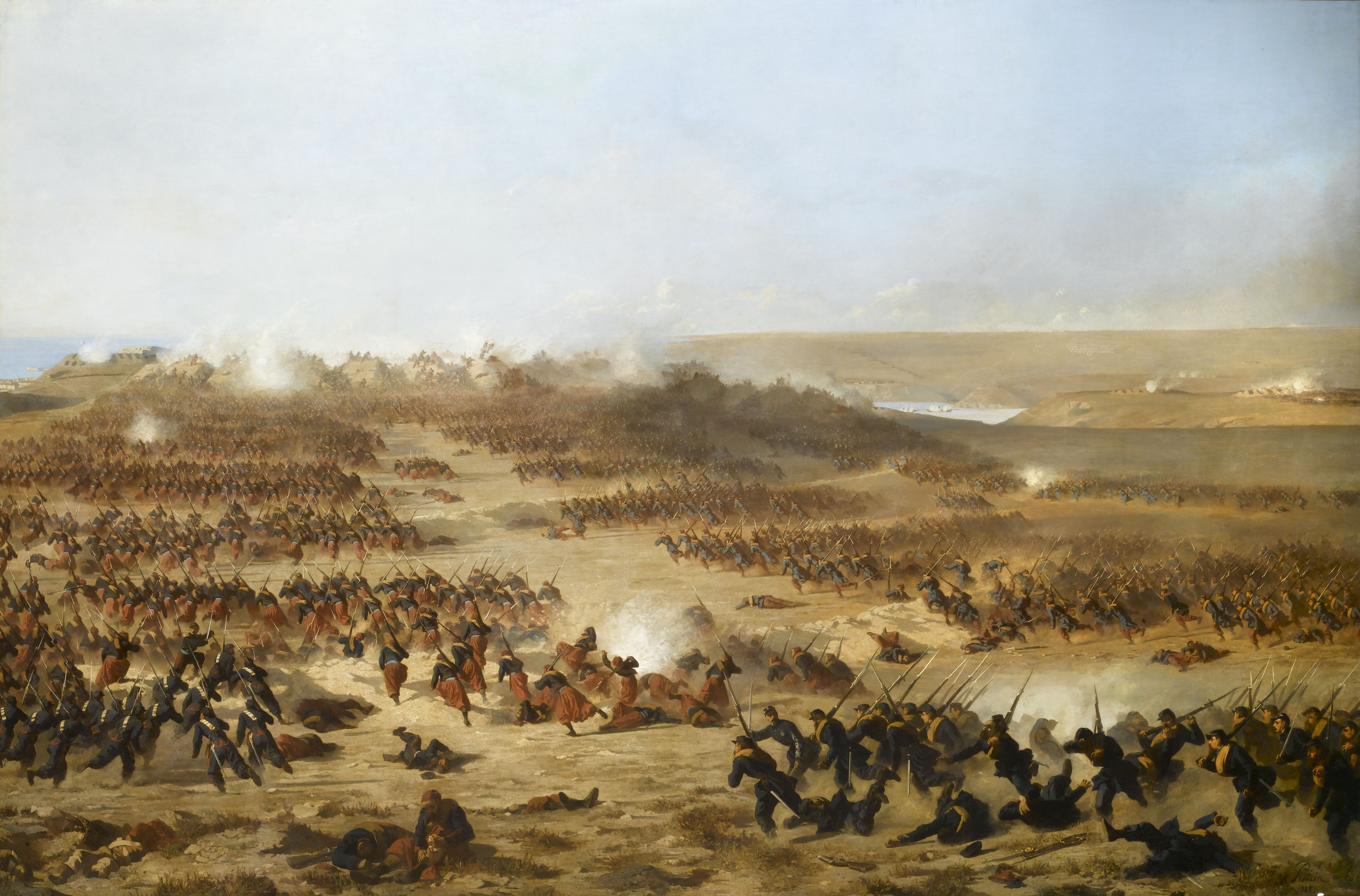
Zouaves attack Russian positions in the Battle of Malakoff during the Crimean War, 1855

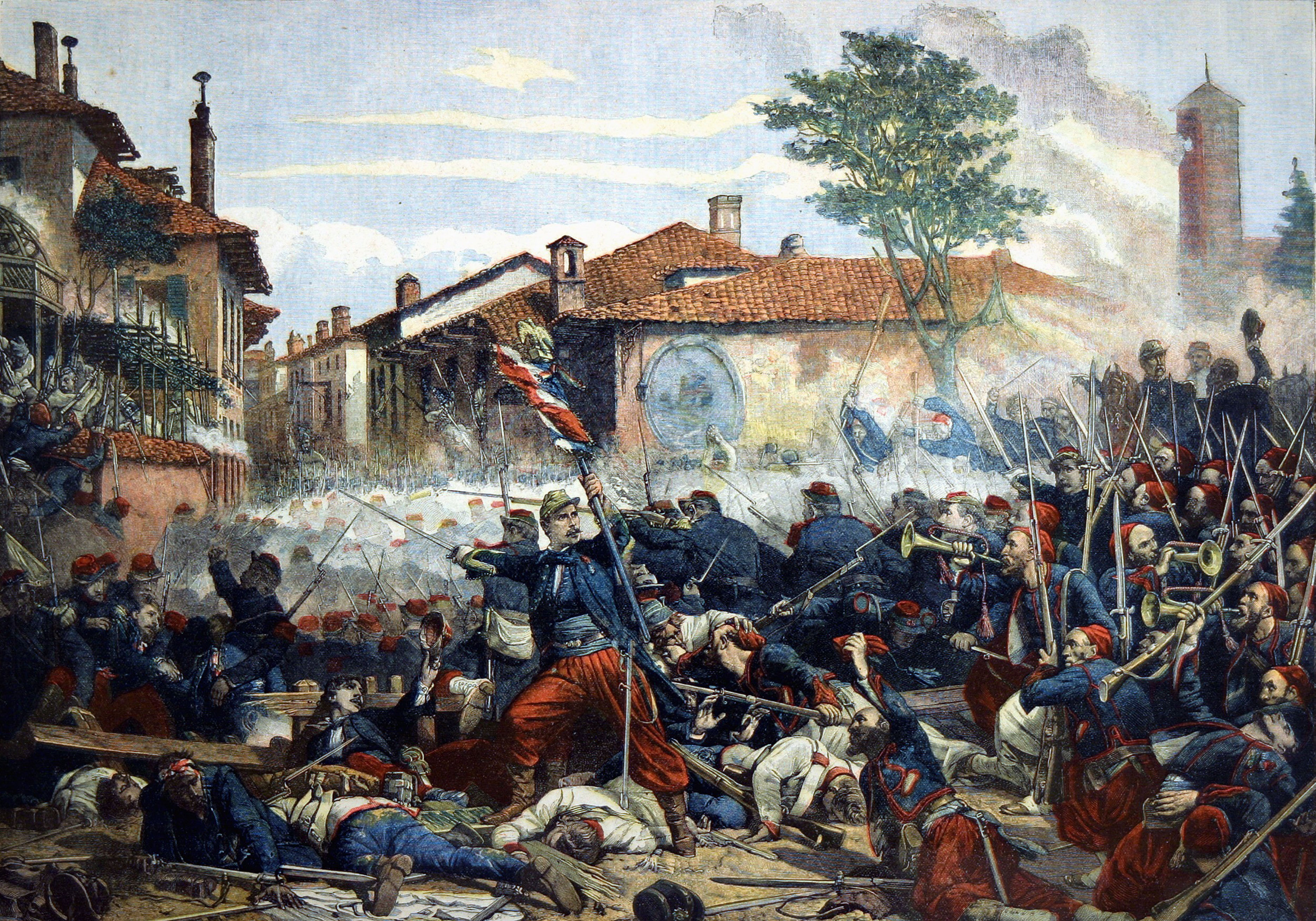
Zouaves with French Foreign Legion at Solferino, 1859

In addition, four mixed zouave and tirailleur regiments (régiments mixtes de zouaves et tirailleurs) were raised for the First World War, all of which were redesignated Algerian tirailleur regiments in 1918 or 1920.

The 9th Zouaves were the last French zouave unit. The first regiment so designated existed from 1914 until the fall of France in 1940. A second was raised in the Second World War and disbanded after the Algerian War. A third existed as a nominal unit from 1982 to 2006 (representing a commando training school). With this symbolic exception, there was no zouave regiment in existence after 1962 and none now survives in the French Army.

=== Early history ===
The zouaves saw extensive service during the French conquest of Algeria, initially at the Mouzaia Pass action (March 1836), then at Mitidja (September 1836) and the siege of Constantine (1837). From 1843-44 either one or two battalions played prominent roles in each of the Kabylia campaigns.

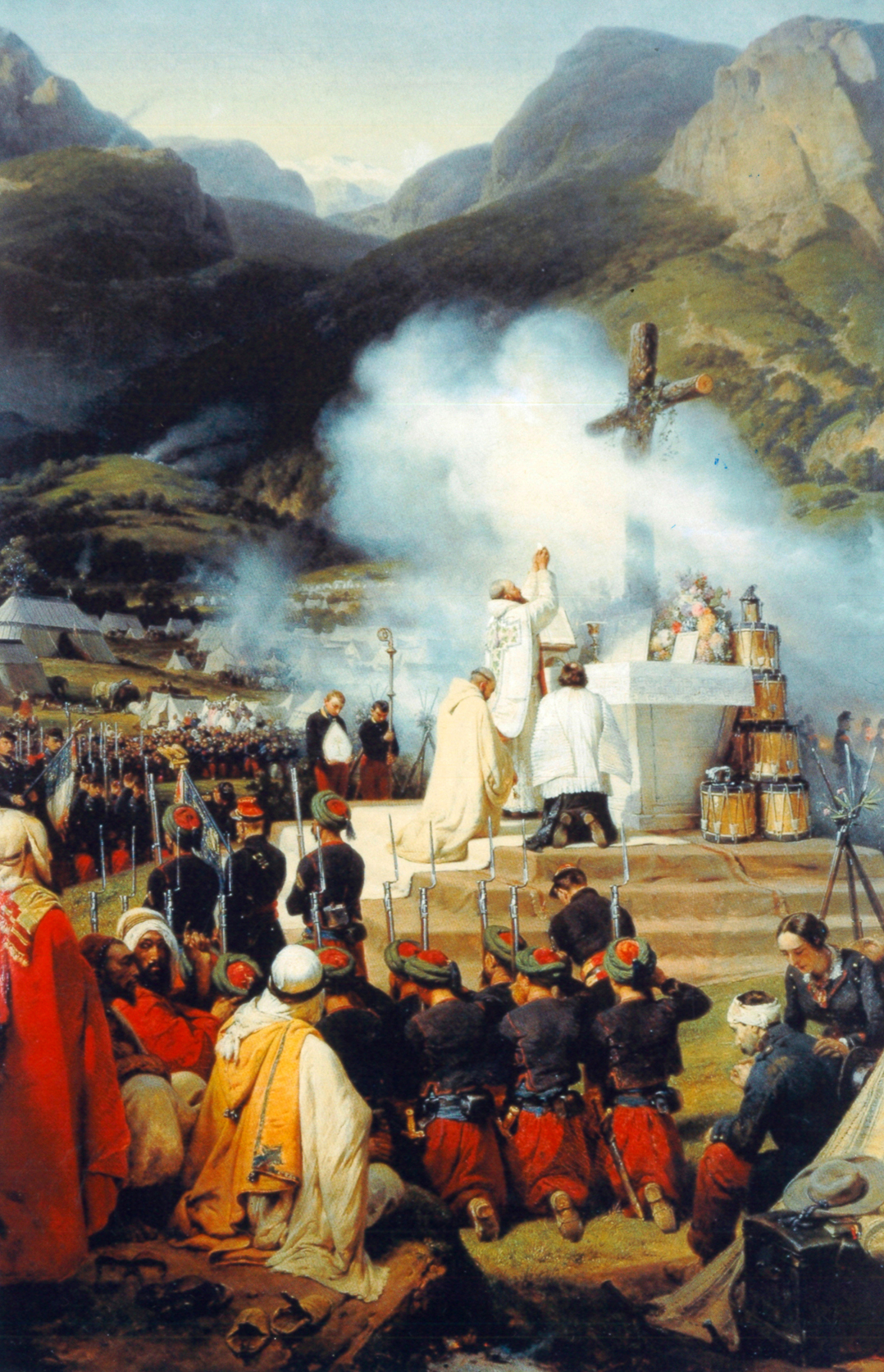
Zouaves in the Kabylia region during the French conquest of Algeria

Recruited through direct voluntary enlistment or by transfer from other regiments of men with at least two years service, the zouaves quickly achieved the status of an elite amongst the French Army of Africa.

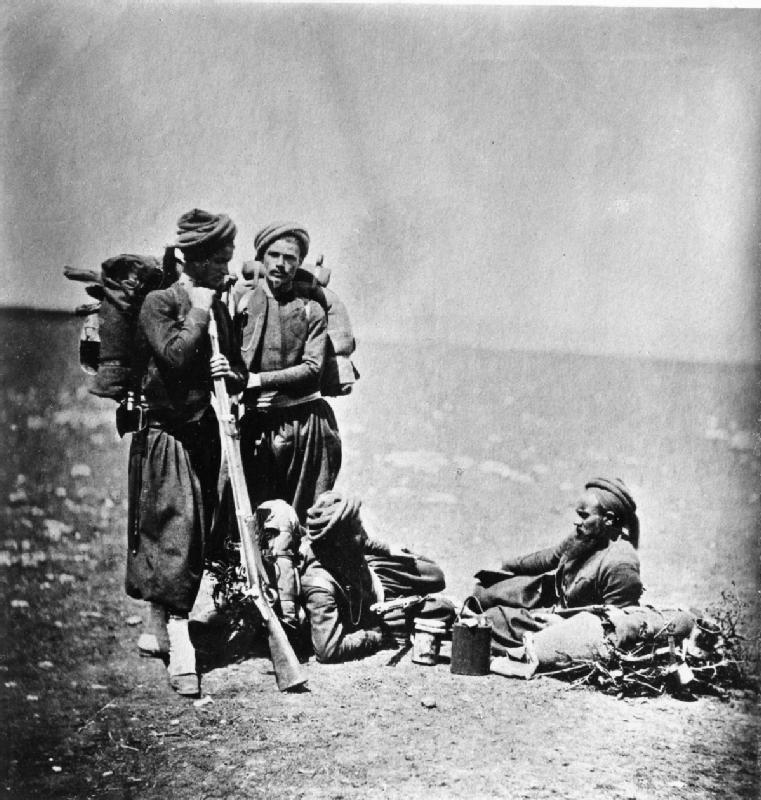
A group of four zouaves of the French Army pose for the camera during the Crimean War, 1854–1856.

=== The Second Empire ===
By 1853, the French Army included three regiments of zouaves. Each of the three line regiments of zouaves was allocated to a different province of Algeria, where their depots and peace-time garrisons were located. The Crimean War was the first service which the regiments saw outside Algeria. Armed with the powerful fusil rayé (rifled gun) they subsequently served as effective light infantry in the Franco-Austrian War of 1859, the Mexican Intervention (1864–1866) and the Franco-Prussian War (1870). In 1860 1,500 zouaves were landed in Beirut to assist in the restoration of order in the Levant, following extensive inter-communal disturbances.

The distinctive dress and dash of the zouaves made them well known outside France and they were frequently portrayed in the illustrated publications of the period. The 2nd Zouaves (popularly known as "the Jackals of Oran") had their mutilated eagle decorated with the Legion d' Honneur following the Battle of Magenta in 1859.

On 23 December 1854 a fourth regiment was created, the Zouaves of the Imperial Guard. The actual formation of this unit was delayed until 15 March 1855 when detachments from the zouave regiments already serving in the Crimea were brought together before Sebastopol for this purpose. Having earned the unusual distinction of being created on the field of battle, the Zouaves of the Imperial Guard served through the remainder of the Crimean War and subsequently in all the campaigns of the Second Empire. Their peace-time garrisons were initially at Saint-Cloud and then Versailles from 1857. This regiment wore the classic zouave uniform but with yellow braiding and piping substituted for the red of the line regiments.

In the opening stages of the Franco-Prussian War the bulk of the serving zouave units were amongst the Imperial field army defeated at Sedan in September 1870. Drawing on remnants of the Imperial forces, depot troops from Algeria and volunteers it was possible to reconstitute all four regiments as part of the Army of the Loire and the Republican defenders of Paris.

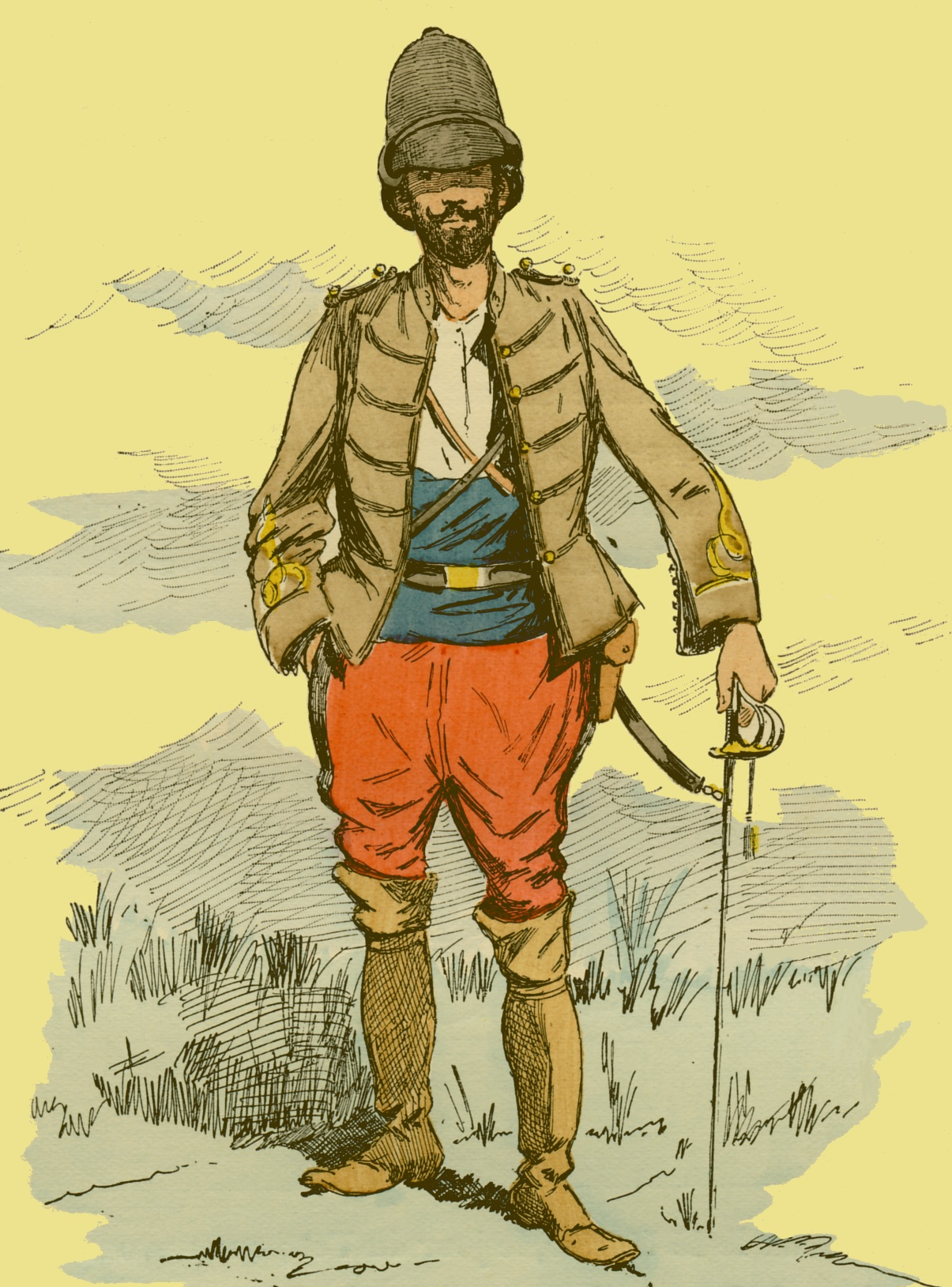
French zouave officer in Tonkin, Spring 1885

=== The Third Republic ===
After 1871 the zouaves lost their status as an elite corps solely made up of long-service volunteers; they became a force mainly composed of conscripts from the French settlers in Algeria and Tunisia, undertaking their compulsory military service. Shortfalls in numbers were made up by detachments from the Paris, Lyon and some northern régions militaires of mainland France (the métropole). The zouave regiments did however retain significant numbers of long-service volunteers (engagés volontaires et réengagés) who contributed to the high morale and steadiness of these units.

Two zouave battalions (under chefs de bataillon Simon and Mignot) served in Tonkin during the closing weeks of the Sino-French War (August 1884 to April 1885). One of these battalions was roughly handled on 23 March 1885 in the Battle of Phu Lam Tao. A third zouave battalion (chef de bataillon Metzinger) joined the Tonkin Expeditionary Corps shortly after the end of the war, and took part in operations against Vietnamese insurgents.

In 1899 a law created for each regiment of zouaves a 5th Battalion, "to be stationed in France". The 5th battalions of the 1st and 4th Zouaves were stationed as part of the Gouvernement militaire de Paris. The 5th battalions of the 2nd and 3rd Zouaves were stationed in the Lyon region. Upon mobilization for war in France, these battalions would form the nucleus of Régiments de Marche de Zouaves, each of 3 battalions. This permanent presence in the two key garrisons of metropolitan France facilitated subsequent arrival and participation by other elements of the 19th Military Region (French colonial Algeria) as reinforcements, in the event of an attack on mainland France.

Zouave battalions subsequently saw active service in China during the Boxer Rising (1900–1901) and in Morocco (1908–1914). From the very beginning of World War I, zouave regiments and detached battalions saw extensive service on the Western Front. Others served in the Dardanelles, Macedonia (within the 156th Division), Tonkin, Algeria, Tunisia, and Morocco. Twelve zouave battalions were recruited for exclusively North African service from French-speaking prisoners-of-war and deserters from German Alsace-Lorraine, who had volunteered to join the French Army.

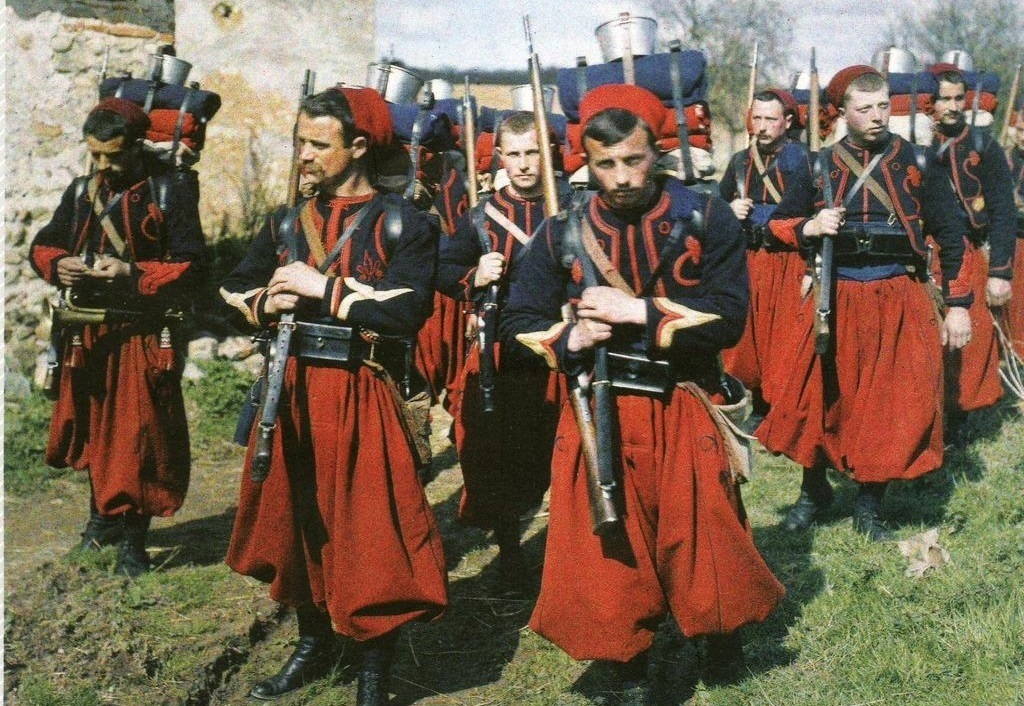
Early colour photograph of the French 3rd Zouaves 1912

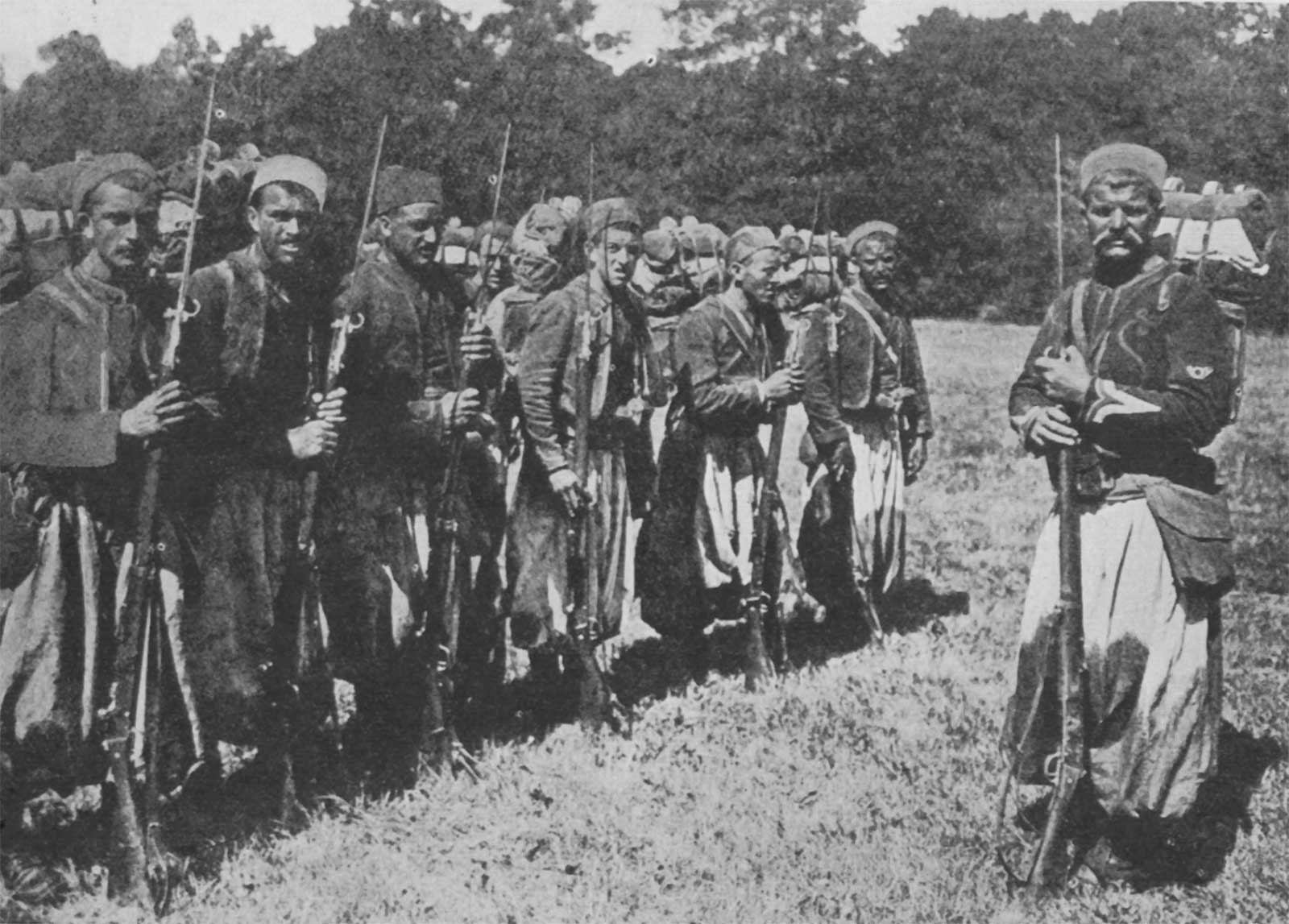
Zouaves during the opening stages of the First World War

The four zouave regiments of the French Army wore their traditional colorful dress during the early months of the First World War. The development of the machine gun, rapid-fire artillery, and improved small-arms obliged them to adopt a plain khaki uniform from 1915 onwards, in common with other units of the Armée d'Afrique. From 1927 to 1939 the "oriental dress" of red fez ("chéchia"), blue sash, braided blue jackets with waistcoats and voluminous red trousers was reintroduced as off-duty dress for re-enlisted NCOs and other long-service regulars in the zouave regiments. It was also worn by colour guards and other detachments on ceremonial occasions. White trousers of the same wide style had, until 1915, been worn as an item of hot-weather or active service dress. The four regiments were distinguished by the colours (red, blue, white and yellow) of the "tombeaus" (circular false pockets) on each side of their open-fronted jackets.

The zouaves played a major role in World War One, with their numbers being expanded to nine régiments de marche (provisional units made up of battalions grouped for specific campaign or other purposes). These units retained much of their traditional panache, especially in attack. They became however less conspicuous in World War II, seeing service mainly during the opening stages of the war in the Battle of France (1940) and in the course of the liberation of France (1944).

=== Post-1945 ===
As predominantly conscript units, the zouaves did not serve in Indochina between 1945 and 1954. They were, however, employed extensively as sector troops during the Algerian War. Their history as a corps of high-profile elite infantry, closely identified with French Algeria, made for higher morale and effectiveness than that of most conscript units from metropolitan France assigned to Algeria. The 9th Zouaves based in the Casbah, played a major role in the 1957 Battle of Algiers.

At the end of the Algerian War, the remaining zouave and tirailleur units were incorporated in a short-lived Force locale de l'ordre Algérienne ("Algerian local law enforcement force") created under the Évian Accords of March 1962 and intended to provide a transitional peace-keeping force acceptable to both Muslim and European communities. The remaining zouave regiments (2nd, 3rd, 4th, 8th, and 9th) were finally disbanded in 1962, immediately following Algerian independence. This was inevitable since their recruitment base was the European population of Algeria, which dispersed with the ending of French rule.

The traditions of the zouave regiments were maintained until 2006 by the French Army's Commando Training School of Givet (Centre d'entrainment commando), which occasionally paraded colour parties and other detachments in zouave dress. With the closure of the CEC school that year and the putting into store of the flag of the 9th Zouaves in 2010, any direct link between the former zouaves and active units of the modern French Army ceased. While other branches of the old French Army of Africa have either survived or been reestablished as representative units in recent years (notably the Foreign Legion, Chasseurs d'Afrique, Tirailleurs, and Spahis), France has not recreated one of its most distinctive and best known military corps.

== Zouave units in Papal service ==
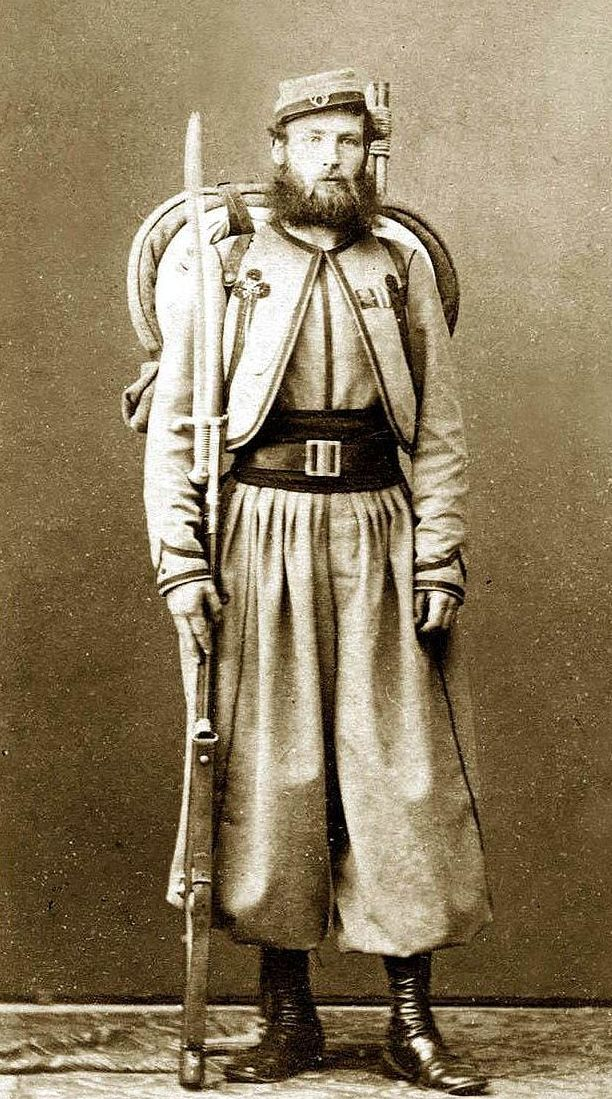
Papal Zouave of Major O'Reilley's Papal Brigade, and a veteran of the battles against Garibaldi. Fully armed and equipped with a .71 calibre Model 1842 French Rifle with sword bayonet, and backpack.

The Papal Zouaves were a corps of volunteers formed as part of the Army of the Papal States. The Zouaves evolved out of a unit formed by Lamoricière in 1860: the Franco-Belgian Tirailleurs. On January 1, 1861, the unit was renamed the Papal Zouaves.

The Zuavi Pontifici were mainly young men, unmarried and Roman Catholic, who volunteered to assist Pope Pius IX in his struggle against the Italian Risorgimento. They wore a similar style of uniform to that of the French Zouaves but in grey with red trim. A grey and red kepi was substituted for the North African fez.

All orders were given in French, and the unit was commanded by a Swiss Colonel, M. Allet. The regiment was truly international, and by May 1868 numbered 4,592 men including 1,910 Dutch, 1,301 French, 686 Belgians, and 240 Italians. A total of three hundred volunteers came from Canada, the United States and Ireland; while the remaining 155 Zouaves were mostly South American.

The Papal Zouaves assisted in the notable Franco/Papal victory at the Battle of Mentana on November 3, 1867. They suffered the brunt of the fighting, sustaining 81 casualties in the battle, including 24 killed (the Papal forces suffered only 30 dead in total). The official report of the battle prepared by the French commander, General de Failly cited the bravery of the Zouaves. They were also mentioned in Victor Hugo's poem Mentana.

The Papal Zouaves also played a role in the final engagements against the forces of the newly united Kingdom of Italy in September 1870, in which the Papal forces were outnumbered almost seven to one. The Zouaves fought bravely before surrender, inflicting losses on the Bersaglieri of the regular Italian Army as the latter stormed the Porta Pia. Several Papal Zouaves were reportedly executed or murdered by the Italian forces following the surrender.

The French component of the Papal Zouaves regrouped as the Volontaires de l'Ouest (Volunteers of the West) to fight on the French side in the Franco-Prussian War, where they kept their grey and red Papal uniforms. The Zouaves saw action outside Orléans, Patay and the Battle of Loigny. The Volontaires de l'Ouest were disbanded after the entrance of Prussian troops into Paris.

In 1871 an English veteran, Joseph Powell, published his account of his service with the Papal Zouaves, Two Years in the Pontifical Zouaves.

== Zouave units in Polish service ==
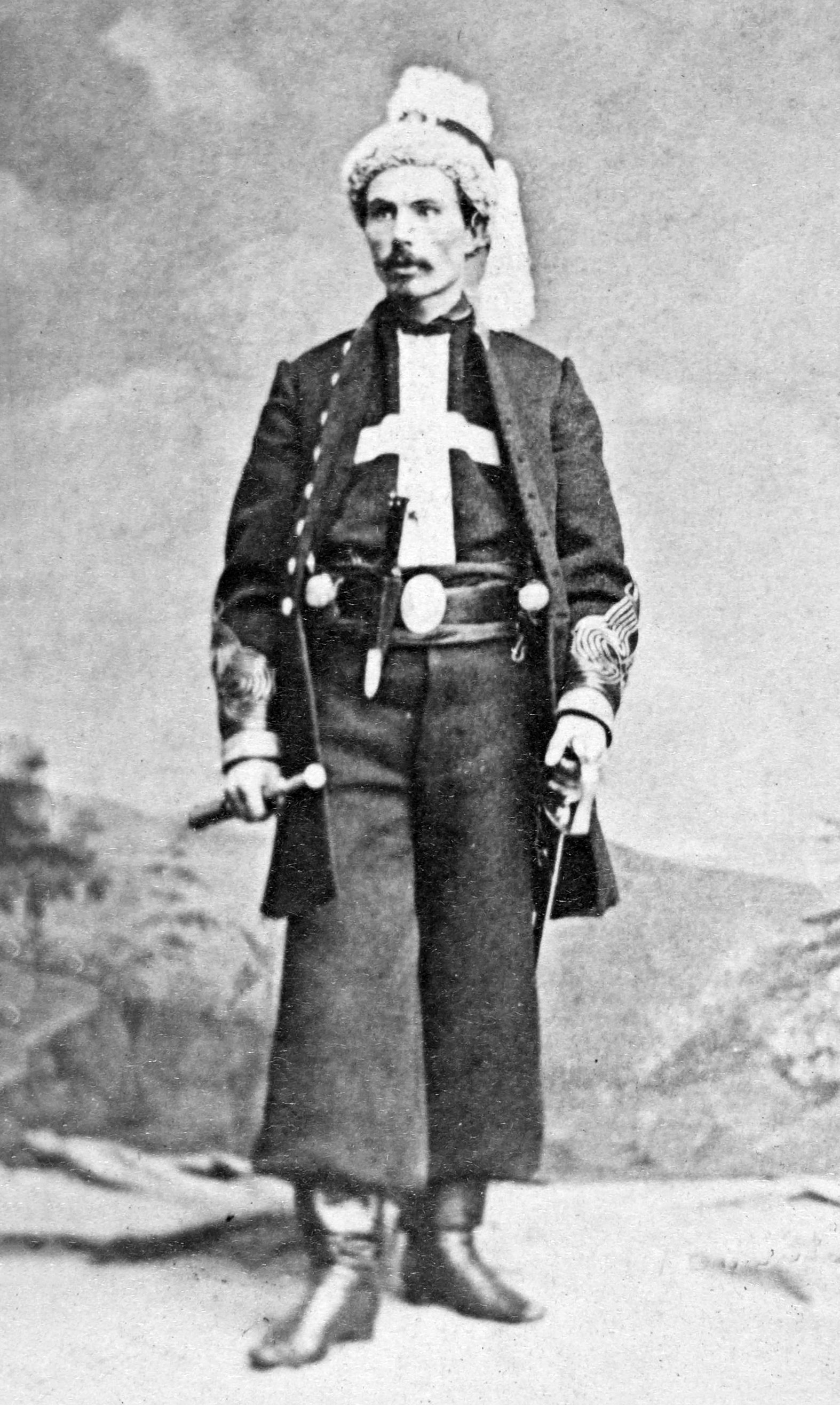
François Rochebrune in uniform of Zouave of Death

In 1863, during the Polish January Uprising against the Russian Empire, a French ex-officer who had served previously in one of the French zouave regiments, François Rochebrune, organised the Zouaves of Death. Members of this Polish unit swore "to conquer or to die" and not to surrender. They wore a black uniform with white cross and red fez.

The unit's baptism by fire occurred at the Battle of Miechów, where under the command of adjutant Wojciech Komorowski, they successfully charged Russian forces defending the local cemetery. However, the overall engagement was a defeat for the Poles on February 17, 1863. Lt. Tytus O'Brien de Lacy escaped with 400 zouaves to Galicia in March 1863. In the Battle of Chroberz the Zouaves covered the retreat of the main body of Polish forces under Marian Langiewicz. They also fought at the follow-up Battle of Grochowiska where they captured Russian artillery positions but suffered very high casualties.

Commanding officers of the regiment were:

- Colonel François Rochebrune;
- Lieutenant Count Wojciech Komorowski;
- Lieutenant Tytus O'Brien de Lacy;
- Lieutenant Antoni Wojcicki; and
- Lieutenant Tenente Bella

== Zouave units in British service ==
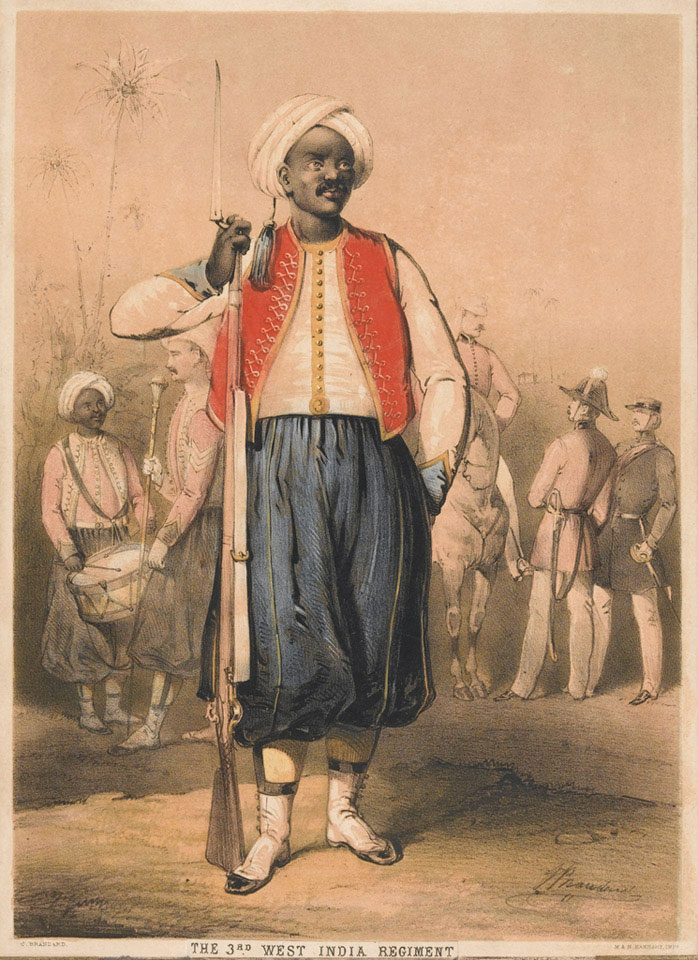
A soldier of the West India Regiments, 1863

In 1856, the West India Regiments of the British Army switched their attire to a uniform modeled on that of the French zouaves. This consisted of a red fez with a white tassel, a white turban, a scarlet sleeveless jacket with yellow trimming, a white long sleeved waistcoat, and dark blue sirwals with yellow piping. White canvas gaiters and leather jamberees completed the uniform. This uniform was reserved for full dress and is still used by the Barbados Defense Force military band and the Jamaica Military Band. Other British colonial units who adopted zouave elements as part of their dress uniforms included the Gold Coast Regiment and the Royal West African Frontier Force.

== Zouave units in American service ==
=== American Civil War ===
==== Union Zouaves ====
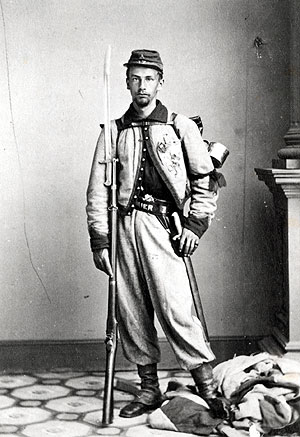
Sergt Francis E. Brownell, 11th N.Y. Regt, 1861.

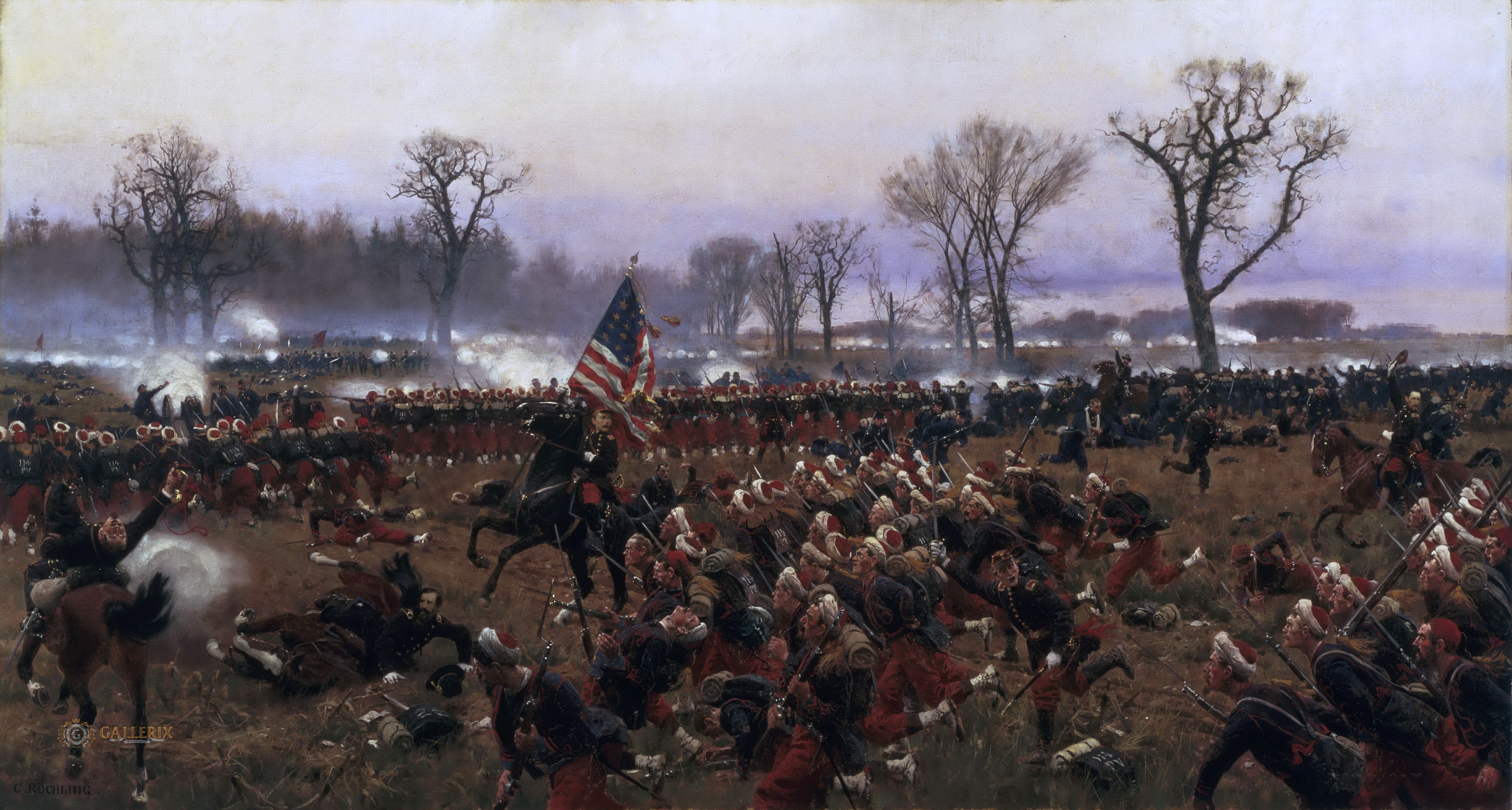
The 114th Pennsylvania Infantry during the assault on Prospect Hill at the Battle of Fredericksburg, December 1862

Numerous zouave regiments were organized from soldiers of the United States of America who adopted the name and the North African–inspired uniforms during the American Civil War. The Union Army had more than 70 volunteer zouave regiments throughout the conflict, while the Confederates fielded about 25 Zouave companies.

In the United States, zouaves were brought to public attention by Elmer E. Ellsworth. Inspired by his French friend Charles De Villers, who had been a surgeon in the North African zouaves, he obtained a zouave drill manual. In 1859, Ellsworth took over a drill company and renamed them the "Zouave Cadets". The drill company toured nationally, performing the light infantry drill of the north African zouaves with many theatrical additions. "Zouave" units were then raised on both sides of the American Civil War of 1861–1865, including a regiment under Ellsworth's command, the 11th New York Infantry known as "Fire Zouaves".

A feature of some American zouave units, at least in the opening stages of the American Civil War, was the light infantry tactics and drill they employed. Zouaves "utilised light infantry tactics that emphasised open-order formations, with several feet between soldiers, rather than the customary close order, with its characteristic 'touch of elbows'. They moved at double-time, rather than marching to a stately cadence, and they lay on their backs to load their rifles rather than standing to do so. To fire, they rolled prone and sometimes rose on one knee."

Arguably the most famous Union zouave regiments were from New York and Pennsylvania: the 5th New York Volunteer Infantry, known as "Duryee's Zouaves" after its first colonel, Abram Duryee; the 114th Pennsylvania Infantry, called "Collis's Zouaves" after their colonel, Charles H. T. Collis; and the 11th New York Volunteer Infantry, the "Fire Zouaves". The 11th New York was initially led by Col. Elmer E. Ellsworth until his death in 1861. The 11th New York was badly mauled during the First Battle of Bull Run in July 1861 when it acted as the rear guard for the retreating Army of the Potomac. The 5th New York was considered one of the elite units of the Army of the Potomac; it was one of only two volunteer regiments serving with the regular division commanded by George Sykes. At the Second Battle of Bull Run, the 5th New York, along with another Zouave regiment, the 10th New York "National Zouaves", held off the flanking attack of James Longstreet's Corps for ten crucial minutes before it was overrun. The 5th New York thus suffered the highest percentage of casualties in the shortest amount of time of any unit in the Civil War – of 525 men, approximately 120 were killed and 330 were wounded in less than 10 minutes.

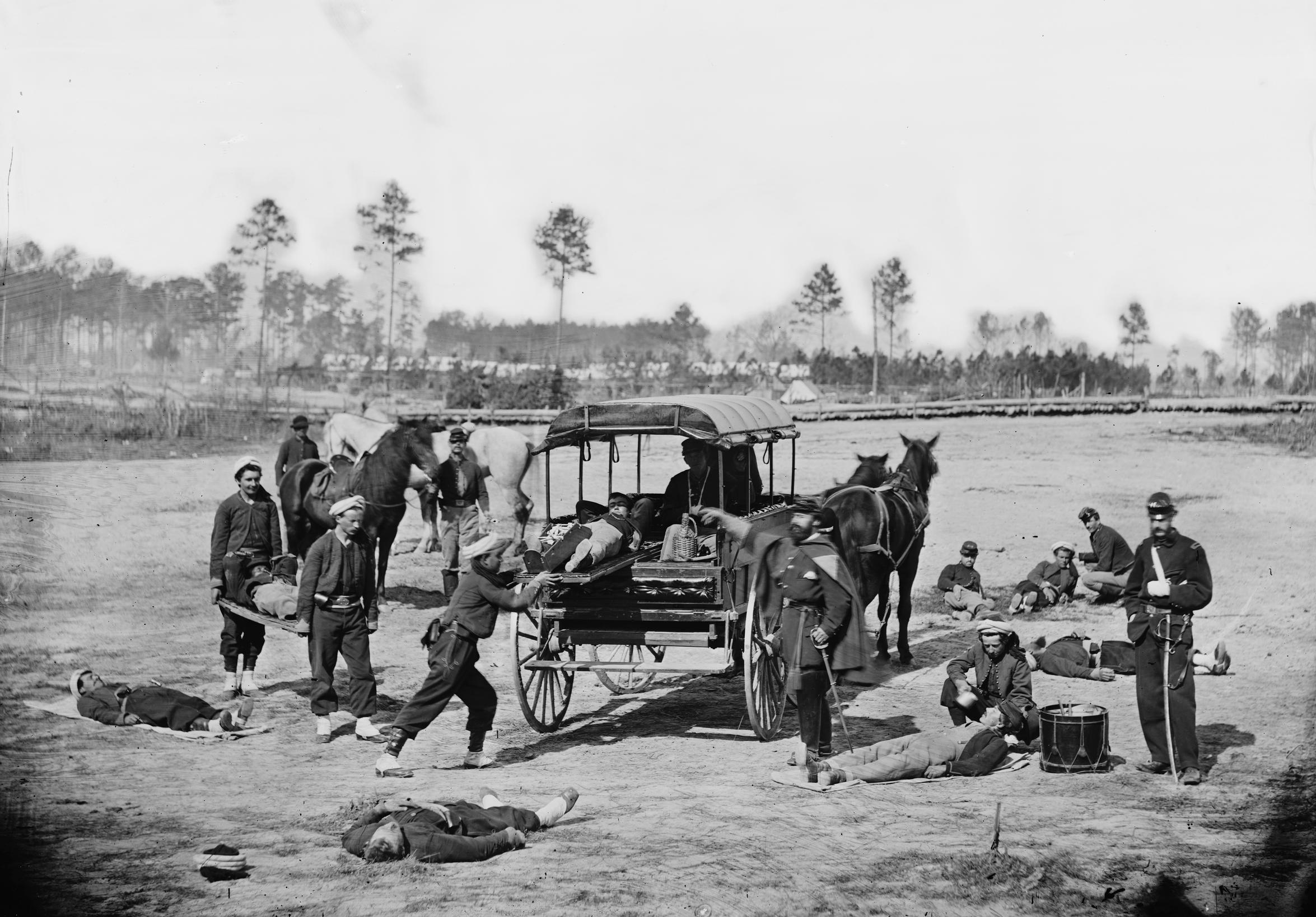
American Zouave ambulance crew demonstrating removal of wounded soldiers from the field, during the American Civil War.

In 1863 and 1864, three Union regiments (146th New York, 140th New York, and 155th Pennsylvania) were issued with Zouave uniforms to reward their proficiency in drill and battlefield performance. Difficulties in supply and replacement meant that Zouave and other exotic militia uniforms tended to be replaced by standard issue uniforms throughout the conflict. However, the tradition remained strong, and the last Union casualty of the fighting in Virginia was reported to be a Zouave of the 155th Pennsylvania, killed at Farmville, Virginia, on the morning of April 9, 1865.

==== Confederate Zouaves ====
A number of Confederate Zouave units were also raised. In contrast to the many Federal units, most Confederate Zouaves were not full "regiments"; many were companies within larger units. The cognomen "Louisiana Tiger" dates from the Mexican-American War. Four different volunteer units from Louisiana adopted the Tiger nickname during the Mexican American War, including the 141st Field Artillery Regiment. But none of the Mexican War Louisiana "Tigers" were Zouaves. The earliest, and most famous, Louisiana Zouave unit was White's Company B (the "Tiger Rifles") of Major Chatham Roberdeau Wheat's 1st Special Battalion, Louisiana Volunteers, also known as "Louisiana Tigers".

Another notable Zouave unit on the Confederate side was the "1st (Coppens') Louisiana Zouave Battalion", which was raised by Georges Augustus Gaston De Coppens in 1861. They saw action from the Peninsula Campaign to the Siege of Petersburg, all the while being short of supplies. They were disbanded in 1865.

The Confederate Zouave units did not last long throughout the war. All of them had traded out their Zouave garb for standard Confederate clothing by 1862. The last Confederate Zouave unit was Coppens' Zouave Battalion, which later became dubbed the Confederate State Zouave Battalion.

=== Post-Civil War ===
Zouaves gradually vanished from the U.S. military in the 1870s and 1880s, as the militia system slowly transformed into the National Guard. As an example, the Wisconsin militia still included one zouave unit in 1879, but the next year, in 1880, the traditional distinctions of title and dress ceased when a standard Wisconsin Guard uniform was adopted. The last Zouave unit in any National Guard was the Elizabeth Gatling Gun battery in the New Jersey National Guard commanded by James Madison Drake. Drake completely disregarded both state and federal regulations and outfitted the unit in Zouave uniforms and allowed only Civil War Veterans to join, the unit was finally ejected from the National Guard in 1892. After the Civil War, veteran groups sometimes dressed as zouaves during honor guard ceremonies such as funeral processions, since zouave dress was considered colorful and distinctive. Modern American Civil War reenactments often feature zouave units.

=== American zouave uniforms ===
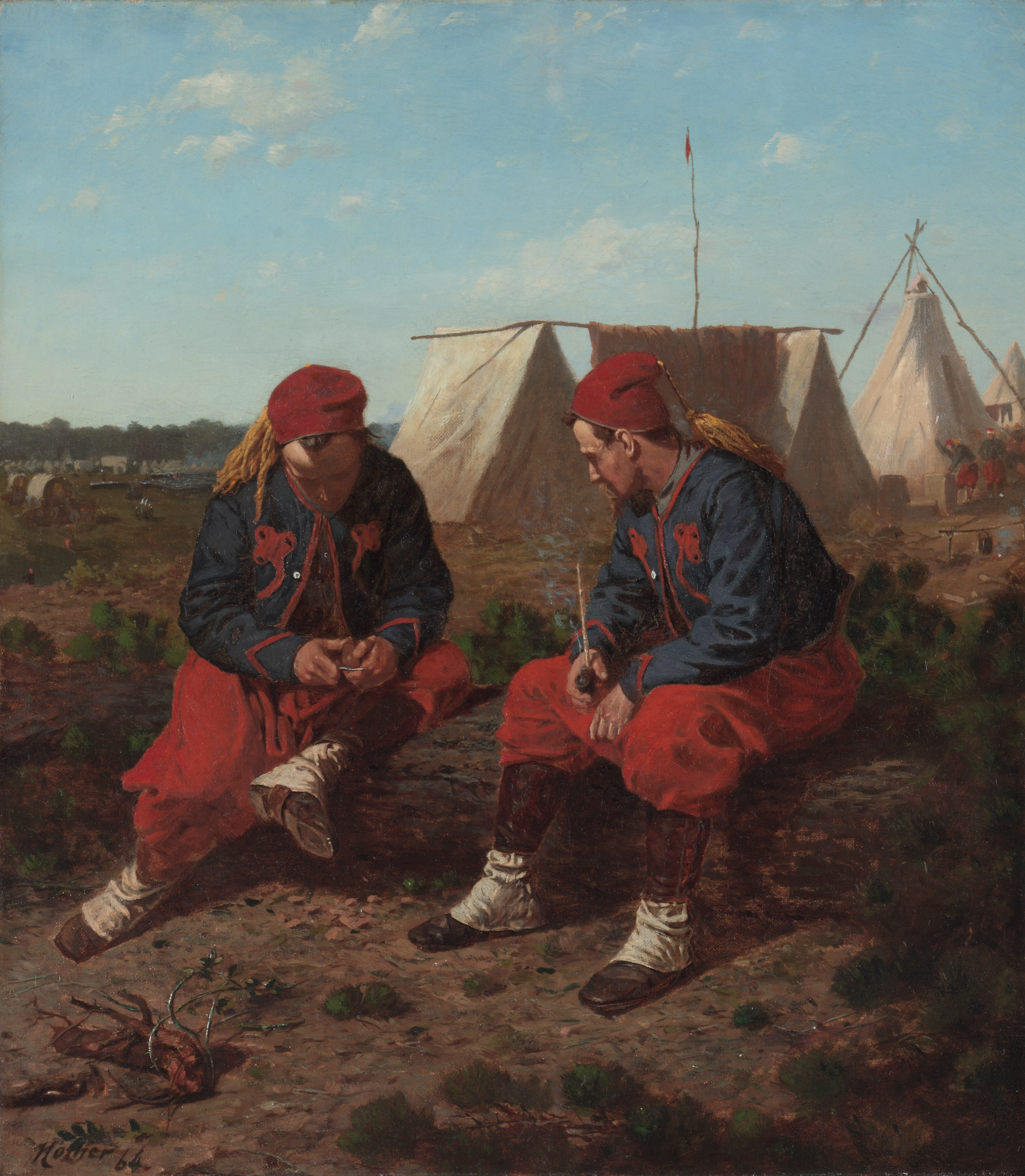
The Brierwood Pipe, an 1864 oil painting by Winslow Homer of two 5th New York Zouaves

The zouave uniform was sometimes quite elaborate, to the extent of being unwieldy. Some Zouave regiments wore a fez with a colored tassel (usually yellow, blue, green, or red) and turban, a tight fitting short jacket (some without buttons), a wide 10-foot-long (300 cm) sash, baggy pantaloons or "chasseur" trousers, white leggings, and a short leather cuff for the calf, called jambieres. The sash was especially difficult to put on, often requiring the help of another zouave. The zouave uniform was better suited for warm climates and rough terrain. The loose pantaloons allowed for greater freedom of movement than trousers, while the short jacket was much cooler than the long woolen blouse worn by most armies of the time.

== Zouave units in Spanish service ==
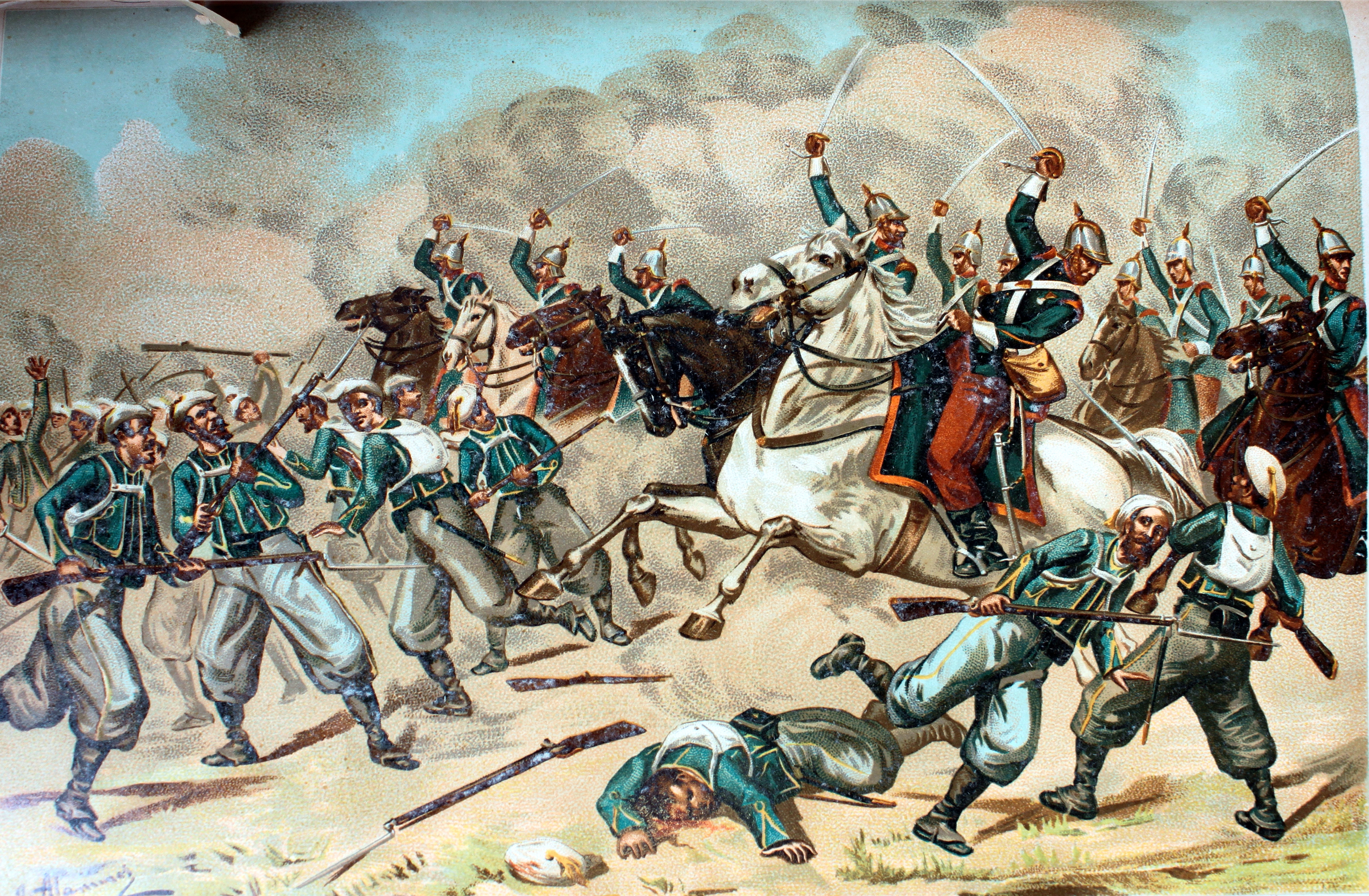
Carlist Zouaves during the Third Carlist War

In the Third Carlist War (1872–1876) the Infante Alfonso Carlos, Duke of San Jaime, (the brother of the Carlist Pretender to the Spanish throne, Carlos, Duke of Madrid) raised a unit of Spanish zouaves, the Carlist Zouaves (Batallon Zuavos), as an honor guard for himself and his wife Maria de las Nieves Braganza. The Carlist Zouaves originated as the sixth company of the second battalion of the Pontifical Zouaves. (Don Alfonso Carlos had formerly served as a lieutenant in the Pontifical Zouaves.) The Carlist Zouaves had the status of an elite unit within the army of Catalonia and the Maestrazgo.

The uniforms of the Carlist Zouaves included the baggy trousers, short jacket, vest and sash of both the French and Pontifical Zouaves. However, the Carlist Zouaves also wore a distinctive feature that differentiated them from existing zouave regiments elsewhere, in the form of a beret of Basque influence with a characteristic tassel. In order to distinguish the troops from the officers, the color of the officer's jacket was a blue-gray shade, with a darker blue for the other ranks. The beret worn by the troops was white with a yellow tassel, while the officers wore a red beret with yellow tassel. The baggy trousers were grayish for all ranks.

== Other zouave units ==
- Between 1880 and 1908 the Turkish Imperial Guard included two zouave regiments. The Abdul Hamid II Collection in the US Library of Congress has a number of photographs of these soldiers. They wore a uniform similar to that of the French zouaves but with green turbans and less widely cut red breeches. The Ottoman Zouaves were disbanded following the Young Turks coup of 1908, when the Imperial Guard was reduced to a ceremonial palace unit.
- Under the Empire of Brazil, a battalion of black volunteers, called the "Zuavos da Bahia" (Bahian Zouaves) was organized in 1865. Although such use drew on a long tradition of black men's service to the Brazilian monarchy and State, both government and army soon rejected such segregated units, scattering its men along other units.
- During his campaign of 1860 against the Kingdom of the Two Sicilies, Giuseppe Garibaldi's Redshirts included a volunteer battalion designated as the Calabrian Zouaves (Zuavvi Calabesi).
- In 1879, at the advent of the War of the Pacific, Peru's Batallón “Zuavos” Nº10 was one of the units which took part in the coup d'etat which brought Nicolás de Piérola into power as the country's "Supreme Commander in Chief". Piérola immediately reorganized the army for the defense of the capital, and the Batallón “Zuavos” Nº29 de Línea was merged into the II Army Corps under the command of Colonel Belisario Suárez. It was later renamed Batallón “Zepita” Nº29, and as such took part in the Battle of San Juan and Chorrillos on 13 January 1881. Another Zouave unit which took part in the battle was the Batallón Nº1 de Zouavos de Lima.

== North African dress influence ==
From 1830 to 1848 the zouave costume was closely derived from contemporary North African clothing. However, with the establishment of the zouave regiments as a permanent and integral part of the French Army, the "oriental dress" became a formalized uniform, subject to regulations while retaining the distinctive features of its indigenous origins.

Features of the zouave dress were widely copied by colonial units of various European armies during the late 19th and early 20th centuries. These included African regiments raised by Portugal, Britain, Spain, and Italy, as well as the West India Regiment in British service.

Variations of zouave-style dress of the short open jacket (shama), voluminous trousers (serouel) and fez were worn by indigenous regiments of the French Army of Africa such as the Spahis and the Tirailleurs Algeriens, although in different colours.

Modern ceremonial units of the Algerian, Moroccan, and Tunisian armies retain items of traditional North African dress, sharing some common features with the tenue orientale of the French zouaves.

== In popular culture ==
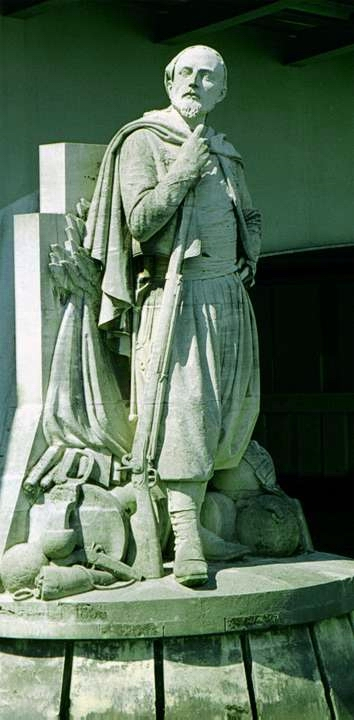
The Zouave statue by Georges Diebolt at the Pont de l'Alma in Paris

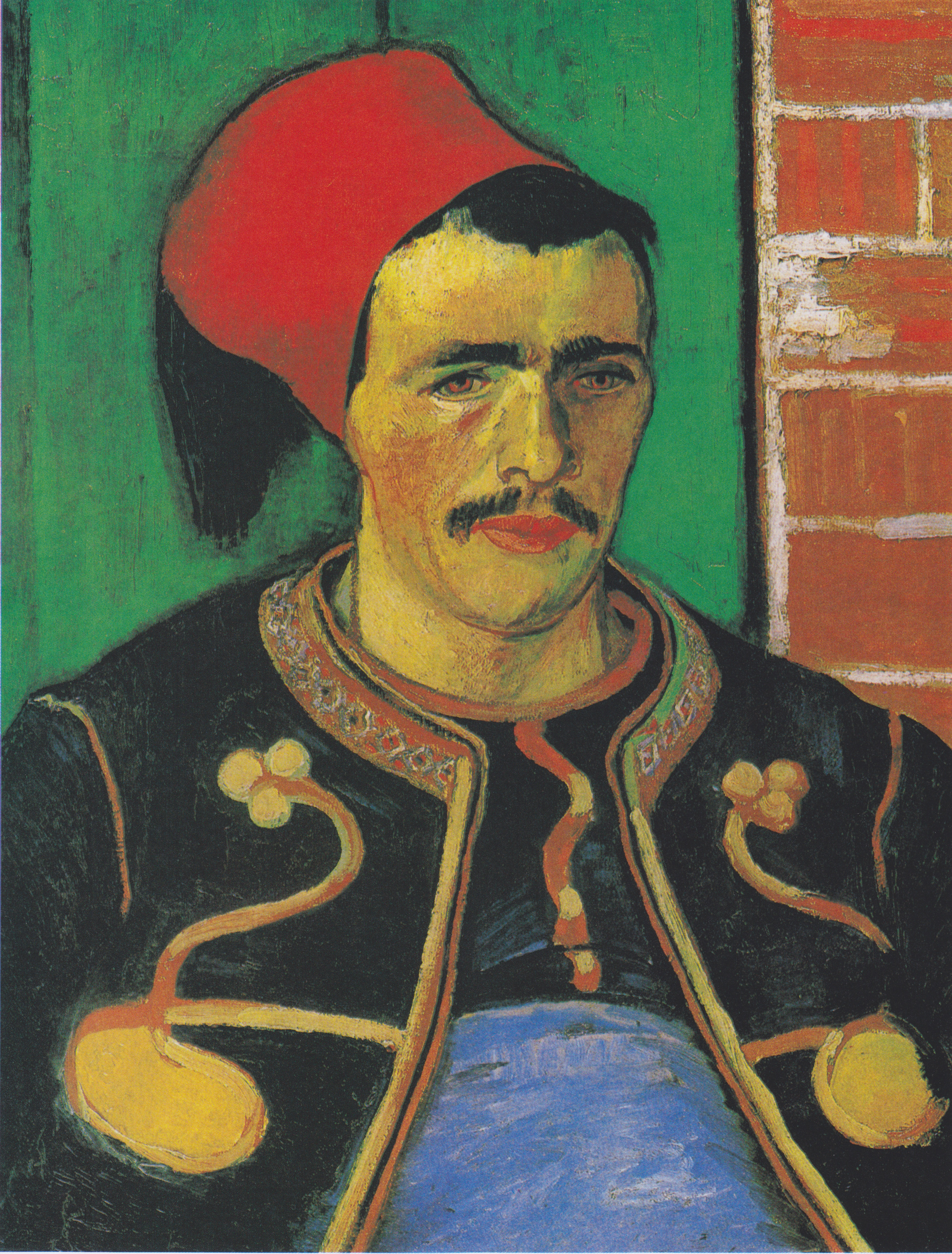
The Zouave by Vincent van Gogh

- In French vernacular speech, the phrase "faire le zouave" can be translated as "to act the goat" i.e. to behave wildly. In this context "zouave" is used as an insult by Captain Haddock, a character in the Belgian comic The Adventures of Tintin. Professor Calculus takes particular offense at the insult in Destination Moon and at the conclusion of Explorers on the Moon.
- A 5.2 m (17 ft) tall statue of The Zouave, carved by Georges Diebolt in the 19th century to form part of the Alma Bridge across the Seine in Paris, serves as a widely watched means of gauging the level of the river. When water reaches a point between the knees and the waist of the "Zouave of the Alma" (le zouave du pont de l'Alma), flooding has historically been considered imminent and river traffic has been halted.
- In the film Gods and Generals, the 11th New York (Ellsworth's Fire Zouaves) and the 14th Brooklyn (84th New York Infantry) are shown fighting the Stonewall Brigade at First Manassas.
- In the film Gettysburg, the 14th Brooklyn are shown during the first day of battle. The 114th Pennsylvania are also shown guarding the Headquarter staff as the Union set up defenses and the 72nd Pennsylvania are briefly shown during Picketts Charge and the epilogue. In the opening credits, a scene that shows three Zouaves of the 5th New York is used as a background.
- In the film Glory, the 14th Brooklyn is shown in the beginning and during the Battle of Antietam. The 14th Brooklyn is actually supposed to represent the Zouave d'Afrique – 114th Pennsylvanian, later known as Collis Zouaves – because the scene represents the assault on the Sunken Road. Zouaves can also be seen escorting General Strong's party as it observes Fort Wagner. These Zouaves are probably supposed to represent the 76th Pennsylvania which was the only Zouave regiment in the tenth corp. However, the uniform on the Zouaves shown does not depict the actual uniform worn by the 76th.
- In the TV miniseries The Blue and the Gray, a group of Union Zouaves is shown fighting at the First Battle of Bull Run. These Zouaves are most likely supposed to represent the 11th New York First Fire Zouaves. However, just like the 14th Brooklyn in Gods and Generals, the Zouaves are shown fighting as part of a regiment instead of an individual regiment. The uniform that the zouaves wear is based on that shown in the Kurz and Alison lithograph of the battle. While both are most likely trying to represent the 11th New York (since it was the only true Zouave regiment present on the field), the uniform is inaccurate. At First Bull Run, the 11th wore red overshirts (most of them discarded the dark blue red trimmed zouave jackets prior to the battle), mid-blue sash, blue or red fez with a blue tassel, and leather gaiters.
- In Margaret Mitchell's novel Gone With The Wind, a Zouave, Rene Picard, joins the Confederate Army of Tennessee in Atlanta, Georgia. Picard is remembered for his good humor, charm, and optimism; also, for his inveterate Creole French accent.
- In the 1955 Danny Kaye film The Court Jester, the Jackson Zouaves American Legion Drill Team from Jackson, Michigan, is seen performing a humorous drill routine using the traditional Zouave quick-march. The group also made several appearances, in full Zouave uniform, on The Ed Sullivan Show between 1953 and 1960.
- In the 1960 Edward Gorey book The Fatal Lozenge, a Zouave is the subject of the final poem in Gorey's alphabetical list. In the poem, the Zouave, used to killing after years of war, stabs a young child who has begun to prattle.
- In the Albert Camus book The First Man – published posthumously in 1994, but based on an incomplete manuscript the author was working on at the time of his death in 1960 – the protagonist's father, Henri Cormery, serves as a Zouave. He dies following injuries sustained in battle during the First World War.
- The figure portrayed on the front of Zig-Zag rolling papers, colloquially known as the "Zig-Zag man", originates from a folk story about a zouave in the battle of Sevastopol. When the soldier's clay pipe was destroyed by a bullet, he attempted to roll his tobacco using a piece of paper torn from his bag of gunpowder.
- In the Buster Keaton film The Playhouse, a zouave drill routine is one of the acts at the theatre. One of the gags involves Keaton's boss telling him to get him some Zouaves and Keaton first hands him a pack of cigarettes (referring to the above brand).

== See also ==
- 9th New York Volunteer Infantry Regiment
- 10th New York Volunteer Infantry Regiment
- 146th New York Volunteer Infantry Regiment
- 62nd New York Volunteer Infantry Regiment
- 8th Missouri Volunteer Infantry
- Pont de l'Alma
- Zouave jacket
- 11th Regiment Indiana Infantry
- Castle Pinckney has photos of the Charleston, South Carolina, Zouave Cadets.
