= Zouaves of Death =

Polish military unit

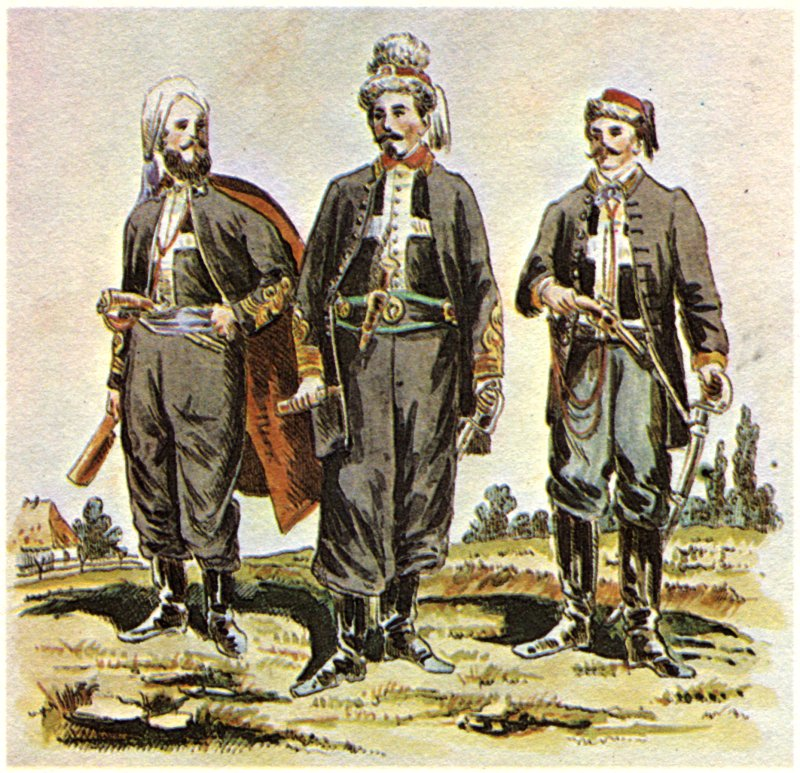
- Zouaves of Death. Colonel François Rochebrune in center.
- Active: 1863
- Country: Poland, Congress Poland
- Type: Light infantry
- Motto: "Victory or death"
- Colors: Black and white
- Engagements: January Uprising: Battle of Miechów; Battle of Chroberz; Battle of Grochowiska; Battle of Krzykawka; Battle of Pobiednik Mały

Commanders
- Notable commanders: François Rochebrune

Zouaves of Death (Polish: Żuawi śmierci) were a Polish military unit during the January Uprising, formed in February 1863 from volunteers in Ojców, Poland, by the Frenchman François Rochebrune (Polish: Franciszek Rochebrune). He based his formation on the French Zouaves, in which he had served during the Crimean War. The Zouaves of Death were highly regarded for their bravery, but they suffered high casualties and their numbers were severely depleted within months. The unit ceased to exist when the rebellion was defeated in 1864. After the fighting in Poland, Rochebrune returned to the French army, as a captain and later colonel.

== Name ==
The name of the unit referred to the original French formations, initially recruited from a particular tribe of the Berbers, the Zouaoua of North Africa, in French Algeria in the 1830s. The "of death" portion of the name referenced the oath that the members of the unit were required to swear upon being accepted, which stated that the only outcome of the military engagements that the unit was to participate in was "either victory or death".

== History ==
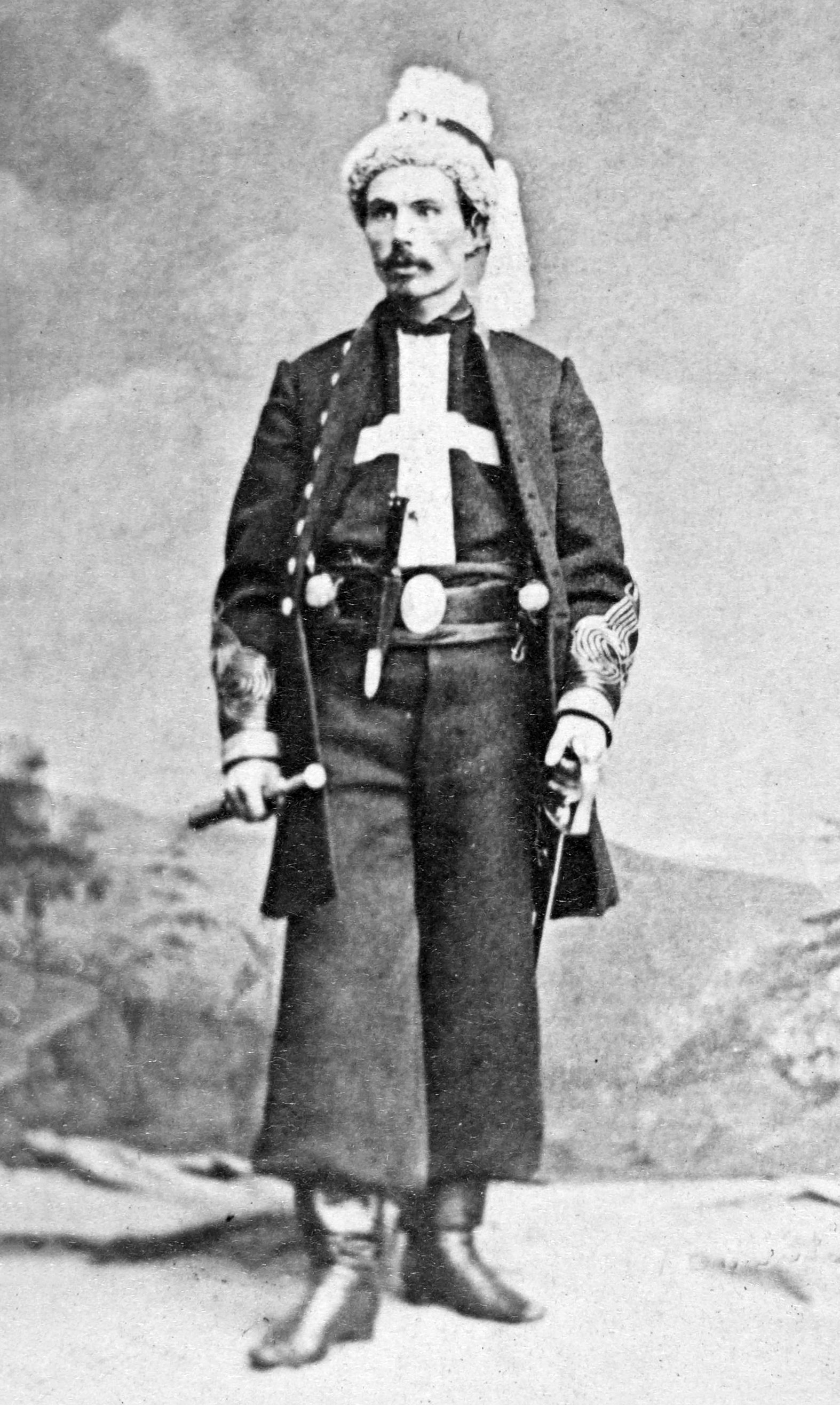
François Rochebrune in the Zouaves of Death uniform.

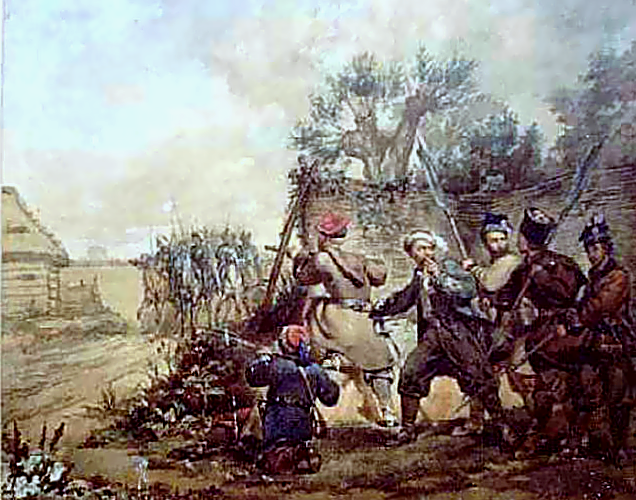
Zouaves of Death in Battle of Miechów during January Uprising 1863 on Walery Eljasz-Radzikowski painting

The formation was known for its distinctive and elaborate uniforms, also based on that of the Algerian Zouaves, which consisted of a cotton shirt, a vest made of elk hide, a black silk robe, a collarless black silk frock coat, puffy hose, a black and white scarf, knee high leather boots, a red fez with a ram skin brim and a distinctive large embroidered white cross on the chest.

The identifying standard of the unit reflected the uniform; it was a black banner with a white cross, surrounded by red and white (national colors of Poland) embroidery with the motto W imię Boże - r. 1863 ("In the name of God - 1863").

The unit's baptism by fire occurred at the Battle of Miechów, where under the command of adjutant Wojciech Komorowski, they successfully charged Russian forces defending the local cemetery. However, the overall engagement was a defeat for the Poles. In the Battle of Chroberz the Zouaves covered the retreat of the main body of Polish forces under Marian Langiewicz. They also fought at the follow-up Battle of Grochowiska where they captured Russian artillery positions but suffered very high casualties. In that engagement Langiewicz lost control over the overall deployment of forces, and it was Rochebrune who assumed command and successfully managed the retreat. As a result, he was promoted to the rank of General and, afterward, even nominated for the position of overall leader of the uprising. However, his candidacy was not recognized and, disillusioned with the political infighting which characterized the insurrection Rochebrune left for France.

Another part of the unit, under Cpt. Stefan Malczewski, fought at the Battle of Pobiednik Mały where, significantly outnumbered, they also suffered heavy casualties, in good part because of their refusal to retreat according to their oath. The bodies of the dead Zouaves were buried in a mass grave and the Tsarist authorities decreed that the grave was to be left unmarked. However, local villagers, in defiance of the order, planted four saplings on the corners of the mass grave to commemorate them. Later on, a cement headstone was constructed and a great grandson of one of the Zouaves who died at the battle funded a memorial statue.

Rochebrune returned to the fight in the final months of 1863 but at that point the insurrection had suffered severe military setbacks and Rochebrune returned to France.

Subsequently Rochebrune was awarded the order of Legion of Honour for his part in the Polish uprising by the French government. He remained a strong advocate for the cause of Polish independence while in France. He took part in the Franco-Prussian War in the rank of colonel where he insisted on fighting in his Zouaves of Death uniform at the head of a unit he called Les Gaulois (The Gauls). He was killed in November 1870 by a sniper shot near Saint-Cloud.

After Rochebrune's departure the Zouaves of Death were led for a short time by the second in command, (nom de guerre "Grzymała"), perhaps Tytus O'Byrn, but for all practical purposes it ceased to exist. A portion of the troops crossed over into Austria, while twenty one of its soldiers remained in Poland and fought, alongside the Garibaldi Legion (Italian volunteers fighting for Poland, organized by Garibaldi's son Menotti Garibaldi and led by Francesco Nullo) at the Battle of Krzykawka.

The Uprising was finally crushed by Russia in 1864.

Włodzimierz Wolski composed a song dedicated to Zouaves, the "March of Zuaves" ("Marsz Żuawów").
