= Battle of Chroberz =

1863 battle

The Battle of Chroberz, one of many skirmishes of the January Uprising, took place on March 17, 1863, near the village of Chroberz in southwestern corner of Russian-controlled Congress Poland. A party of 3000 Polish insurgents commanded by Marian Langiewicz, clashed with units of the Imperial Russian Army. The Poles managed to defeat the enemy, with heavy losses on both sides.

After the victorious Battle of Skala, Polish insurgents, who had tried to cross the border with nearby Austrian Galicia, turned northwards and headed towards Miechów. When Poles were camping in Chroberz, they found out about a Russian unit, which marched towards them from Pinczów, along the Nida river valley. Polish commandant (naczelnik) Marian Langiewicz ordered François Rochebrune and his Zouaves of Death to cover the march of the main group of Polish forces. When another Russian unit appeared on the left bank of the Nida, Langiewicz sent there infantry under Colonel Dionizy Czachowski. Meanwhile, Rochebrune burned a bridge over the Nida, and joined Langiewicz. All Polish forces began to retreat, protected by Czachowski's infantry. The Russians followed them, and the battle continued for several hours.

All together, Polish rebels lost 300 men, Russian forces also recorded 300 killed and wounded.

== Sources ==
- Stefan Kieniewicz: Powstanie styczniowe. Warszawa: Państwowe Wydawnictwo Naukowe, 1983. ISBN 83-01-03652-4.
