= Battle of Grochowiska =

1863 battle during the January Uprising

- Part of the January Uprising
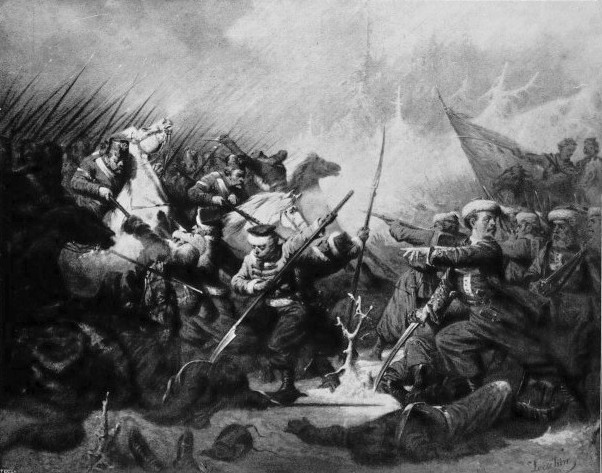
- Zouaves of Death in a skirmish.
Date	18 March 1863
Location	Grochowiska 50.4975°N 20.636944°E
Result	Polish victory

Belligerents
Polish National Government	Russian Empire

Commanders and leaders
Marian Langiewicz, Francois Rochebrune	Ksawery Czengiery

Strength
3,000	3,500 and 6 artillery pieces

Casualties and losses
300	25 killed, 44 wounded, 18 POWs
- Location of the battle

The Battle of Grochowiska took place on 18 March 1863 at the village of Grochowiska near Pińczów, Poland during the Polish January Uprising against the Russian Empire. It involved a 3,000-strong unit of Polish insurgents under the command of Marian Langiewicz which had been cornered by Russian forces numbering around 3,500 soldiers and six artillery pieces. It was one of the most bloody, as well as one of the largest battles of the Uprising.

== Setting ==
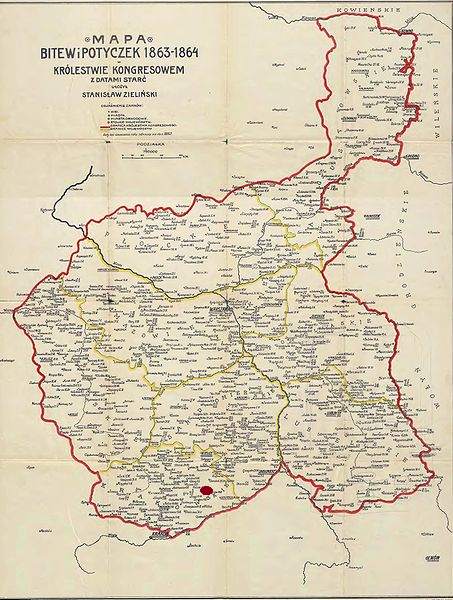
Battles of the January Uprising in Congress Poland, 1863–1864. Grochwiska is located in the south.

In the aftermath of the Battle of Chroberz, Polish insurgents under Marian Langiewicz were intercepted in a forest by a stronger Russian force. The battle took place in a very unfavorable circumstances, since the Polish forces were caught by the Russians while trying to withdraw through inhospitable forests and swamp land; neither side was prepared to fight in this terrain.

Langiewicz's force was composed of two infantry regiments with three battalions of 350 soldiers each (so, 2100 infantry), two units (pułk) of cavalry, 400-strong each, 100 military engineers, 150 in the command units (incl. its security detachment) and about 450 non-combatant support personnel.

== Battle ==
The insurgents were attacked on the flank by a column of troops moving from Stopnica, as well as by the troops in their front. Despite the initially unfavorable situation for the Polish forces, which were trying to avoid contact with the opponent, a charge by the Zouaves of Death, under the command of Francois Rochebrune, captured the Russian artillery and eventually forced the Russians to withdraw. The kosynierzy (peasant troops armed with scythes), under the command of Col. Dąbrowski also contributed to the overall outcome of the engagement when they successfully attacked and routed two regiments of Smolensk infantry. Another Polish unit under Dionizy Czachowski covered the rear of the insurrectionist forces, and after heavy fighting moved towards Stopnica.

During the battle, Langiewicz lost control over his troops who initially panicked. It was Rochebrune, who with the help of his Zouaves, managed to restore discipline and lead a successful attack on Russian positions. He did so by personally grabbing panicked soldiers, throwing them back into the line, pointing his gun at them and cursing in broken Polish ("Psiakehv! Ktoha godzina?" – "Goddammit! Would you tell me the time?" – which according to contemporary sources was the only Polish he knew). As a consequence after the battle, Rochebrune was promoted to the rank of general and considered for the role of the overall leader of the uprising (ultimately rejected for political reasons).

== Aftermath ==
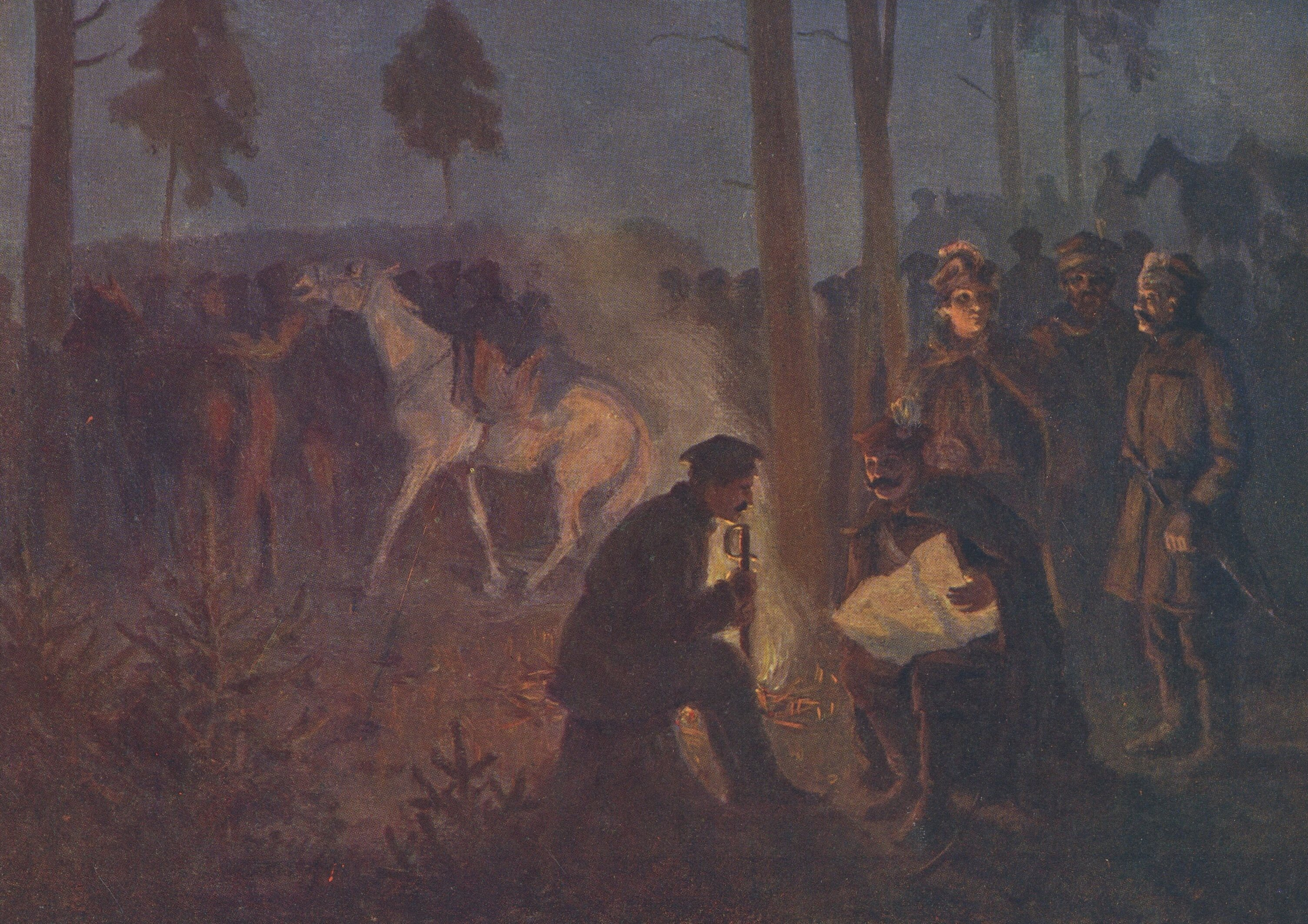
After the Battle

Despite the fact that Polish forces successfully escaped annihilation, they found themselves dispersed, were forced to retreat towards Pińczów and had trouble reorganizing afterward. As a result, shortly after the battle, Langiewicz crossed into Austria with a portion of his troops, where he was interned a week later. This ended Langiewicz's short career as the dictator (leader) of the uprising (he was chosen around 10 March). Hence, while the Polish forces managed to repel the attack and avoid destruction or capture, their high losses and eventual retreat across the border led some commentators to describe the battle as a Pyrrhic victory for the Poles.

== Notable participants ==
Albert Chmielowski, who was later to become known as "Saint Albert" of the Catholic Church after he had founded the Albertines, took part in the battle on the Polish side, as a 17-year-old recruit. Priest Agrypin Konarski also participated in the battle.

The future painter Bronisław Abramowicz served as adjutant to Langiewicz during the battle and was wounded.

== Commemoration ==
Several tombstones and memorials commemorate the battle near the village of Grochowiska. A historical reenactment of the battle is also held in the area between Pinczow and Grochowiska annually.
