= Langiewicz =

Langiewicz is a Polish surname. Notable people with the surname include:

- Marian Langiewicz (1827–1887), Polish resistance military leader
- Wiesław Langiewicz (born 1940), Polish basketball player
