= François Rochebrune =

Polish general (1830–1870 or 1871)

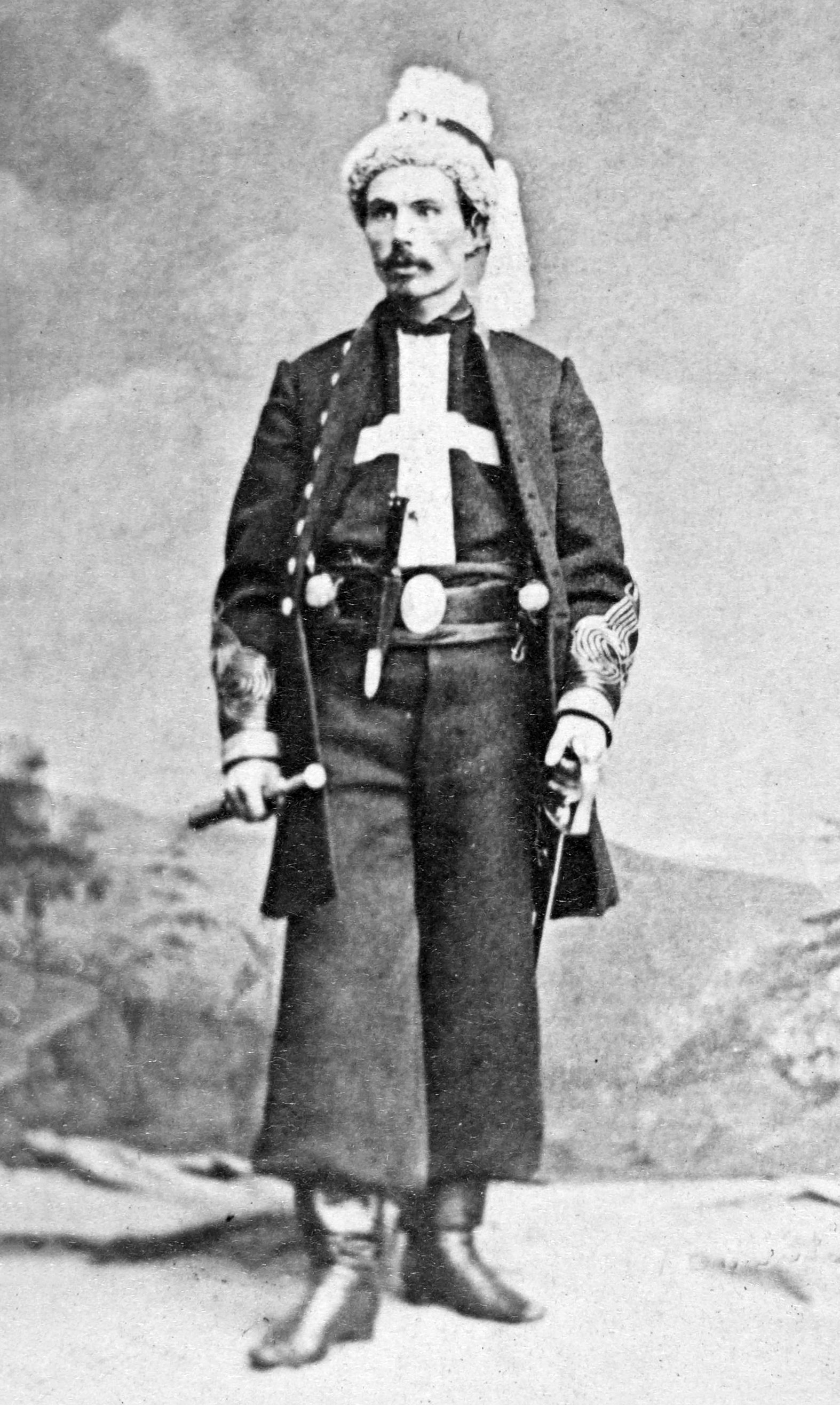
- Rochebrune in his Zouaves of Death uniform
- Born: 1 January or 1 June 1830; Vienne, Isère, France
- Died: 19 November 1870 (aged 40); Montretout, Paris, France
- Military career
- Allegiance: France; Polish National Government
- Rank: Colonel
- Units: 17th Regiment of Line Infantry; Zouaves; Zouaves of Death
- Commands: Zouaves of Death
- Conflicts: Crimean War; Second Opium War; January Uprising; Battle of Miechów; Battle of Grochowiska; Franco-Prussian War; Siege of Paris †
- Awards: Legion of Honour

François Rochebrune (Polish: Franciszek Rochebrune; 1 June or 1 January 1830 – 19 November 1870 (some sources state 1871)) was a French soldier who served in the French Zouaves during the Crimean War. He then lived in Poland for two years as a tutor. He returned to the French Zouaves for five years, serving as a sergeant in China. He then returned to live in Poland once again in 1862. When the Polish rebellion against Russian rule began in January 1863, he formed and led a Polish rebel unit called the Zouaves of Death. Within months, he had been promoted to general. After the collapse of the uprising, he returned to France, where his exploits in Poland earned him the rank of captain in the French army. He was promoted to colonel for the Franco-Prussian War, and was killed by a sniper during the Siege of Paris at the age of forty.

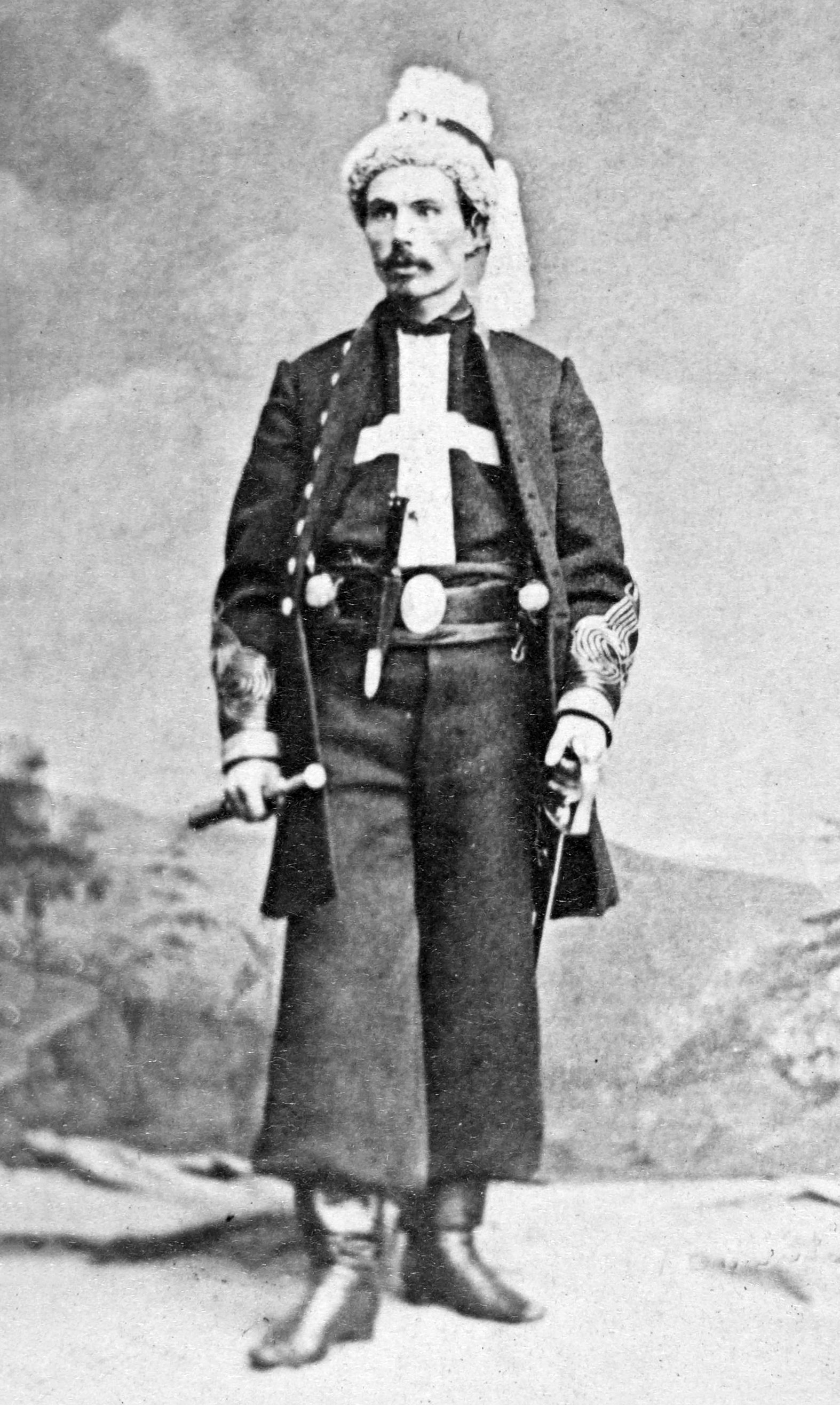
François Rochebrune in the Zouaves of Death uniform.

== Biography ==
Rochebrune was born in Vienne in Isère, France, to an impoverished family. When he was fourteen he began an apprenticeship in a printer's shop. He then joined the French Army. He served in the 17th Regiment of Line Infantry and, during the Crimean War, in the Zouaves formation. From 1855 to 1857 he taught French to local gentry (szlachta) in Kraków, Austrian partition of Poland. In 1857 he was a sergeant during the Second Opium War. He left French service and in 1862 moved to Warsaw, at the time part of the Russian-controlled Congress Poland. A short while later he moved on to Kraków, where he opened a fencing school. The school soon became a sort of military academy (the only one of its kind in the Austrian partition of Poland), which ended up training many of the future Polish officers of the January Uprising.

When the January Uprising broke out in 1863, Rochebrune volunteered his services to the leaders of the uprising and together with some of the students from his fencing school reported to an insurrectionist camp at Ojców organized by Apolinary Kurowski. There, based on his experience in the French Zouaves, Rochebrune formed the units that came to be known as the Zouaves of Death. Their first military engagement occurred at the Battle of Miechow, on 17 February, where Rochebrune himself led a bayonet charge on Russian positions. The unit suffered very high casualties, and although its own attack was successful the overall battle was a loss for the Polish forces. After the battle, Rochebrune began writing his name as "de Rochebrune".

He reorganized the Zouaves of Death in Kraków and led them in battles of Chrobrze and Grochowiska. In the latter engagement, after General Marian Langiewicz lost control over the Polish forces, Rochebrune, with the help of his Zouaves, took command and restored order, by personally grabbing panicked soldiers, throwing them back into the line, pointing his gun at them and cursing in broken Polish ("Psiakehv! Ktoha godzina?" – "God dammit! Would you tell me the time?" – which according to contemporary sources was the only Polish he knew). He then led a successful attack of his zouaves and "kosynierzy" troops, forcing the Russians to flee. As a result, after the battle he was promoted to general. His candidacy was considered for the Uprising commander-in-chief. It was rejected, and Rocherbrune, disappointed with the political infighting, left temporarily for France. He returned later that year, and fought in Wołyń, taking part in the lost Battle of Poryck.

In France, for his valor in the Uprising, which was a popular cause among the French public, he was awarded Legion of Honour and promoted to the rank of captain. He rejoined the French Army, and later fought in the Franco-Prussian War in 1870. He commanded a unit nicknamed les Gaulois (the Gauls), and wore the Zouaves uniform. He died on 19 November 1870, at Montretout, during the Siege of Paris as a colonel attached to the 19th French National Guards.
