= Battle of Skała =

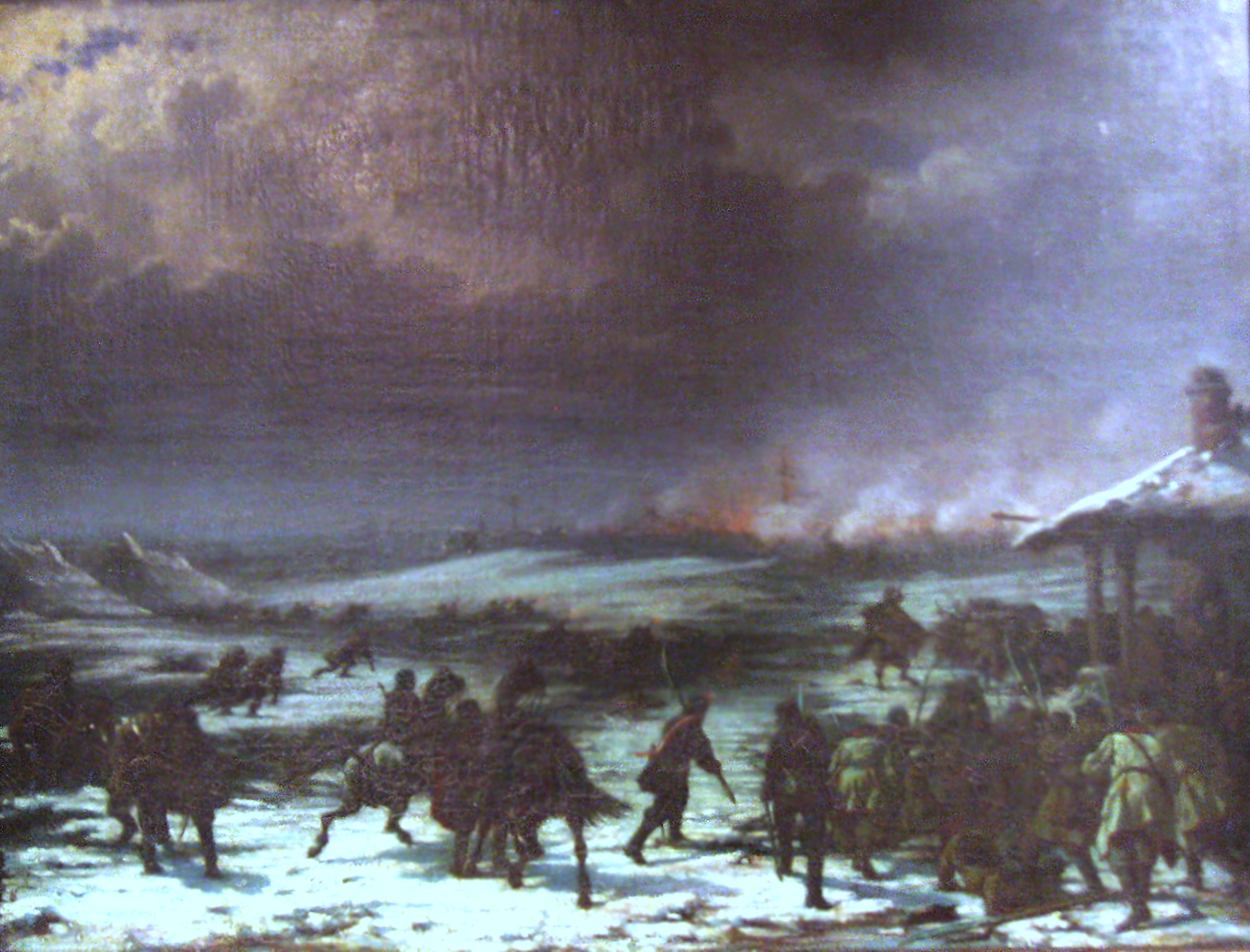
Battle of Skała by an anonymous painter, 1863-4. Currently located at the Polish Army Museum in Warsaw.

The Battle of Skala, one of many skirmishes of the January Uprising, took place on 5 March 1863 near the town of Skała in the southwestern corner of Russian-controlled Congress Poland. A party of 1,500 Polish insurgents commanded by Marian Langiewicz and Antoni Jezioranski, heading towards the border with Austrian Galicia, clashed with a 400-strong unit of the Imperial Russian Army. The Poles, who had a numerical superiority, managed to defeat the enemy.

The skirmish began when Poles attacked Russian unit under Major Stozenwald, which camped at a cemetery in Skała. After a three-hour battle, the Russians retreated toward Miechów, leaving their supplies at the cemetery. Polish insurgents lost 23 men, with additional 24 wounded.

== Sources ==
- Stefan Kieniewicz: Powstanie styczniowe. Warszawa: Państwowe Wydawnictwo Naukowe, 1983. ISBN 83-01-03652-4.
