= Battle of Miechów =

1863 battle

- Part of The January Uprising
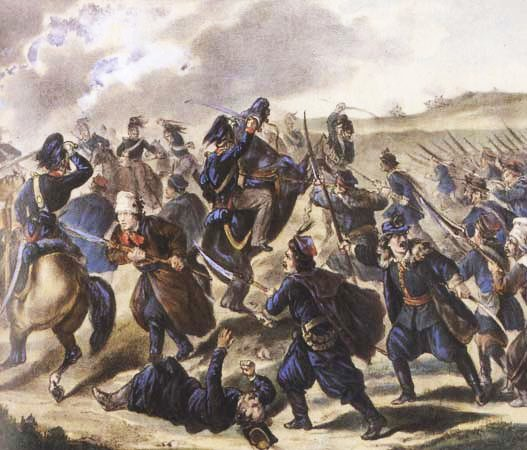
- Battle of Miechów
Date	17 February 1863
Location	Miechów, Poland (then Congress Poland) 50.357778°N 20.0325°E
Result	Russian victory

Belligerents
Polish insurgents	Russian Empire

Commanders and leaders
Apolinary Kurowski	Major Nepenin

Strength
2,500	550

Casualties and losses
Around 200, 67 POWs	7 killed, 32 wounded
- Location of the battle

The Battle of Miechów took place on February 17, 1863, near Miechów in Małopolska, Poland (at the time Congress Poland), during the January Uprising.

Polish units under Apolinary Kurowski numbering around 2,500 troops attacked the town in an attempt to gain control of the so-called border triangle - an area at the crossroads of the Austrian, Prussian and Russian partitions which would have allowed the insurgents access to supplies and troops from outside the Congress Poland where the uprising proper was taking place. They were hoping to surprise Russian troops. However, the Russian garrison (2 companies, 550 men) was stronger than expected by insurgents. Either the Russian commander guessed the intent, or the strategic plan of the Poles was somehow betrayed. As a result, they bolstered their defenses.

Initial engagements were favorable to the Poles. These included a successful charge by the Zouaves of Death, a unit organized by Francois Rochebrune and led by Wojciech Komorowski in this battle, on Russian positions in the local cemetery. However, charges by the Polish cavalry through the narrow streets of the town resulted in very high casualties in the face of concentrated fire from the Russians and eventually a panic of the Polish troops. According to contemporary Russian reports, 200 insurrectionists died. There were also some reports of atrocities, including the killing or burying alive of the wounded. As a measure of repression, the town was set on fire and local residents were forbidden to put it out.

As a result of the engagement, Kurowski's unit ceased to exist. Rochebrune reformed his Zouaves later in Kraków.

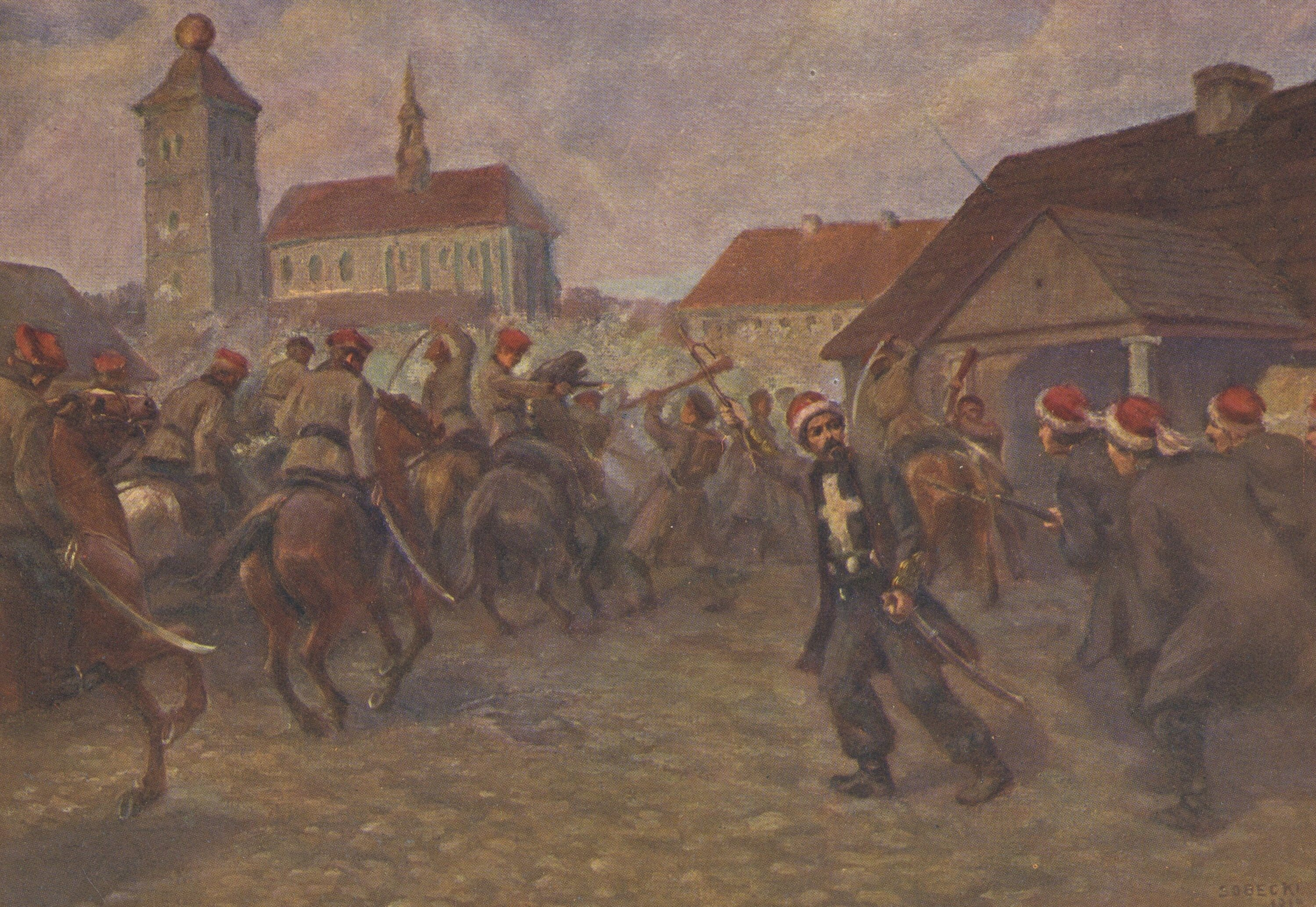
Battle of Miechów (J. Sobecki)
