= Montretout =

- Gated community
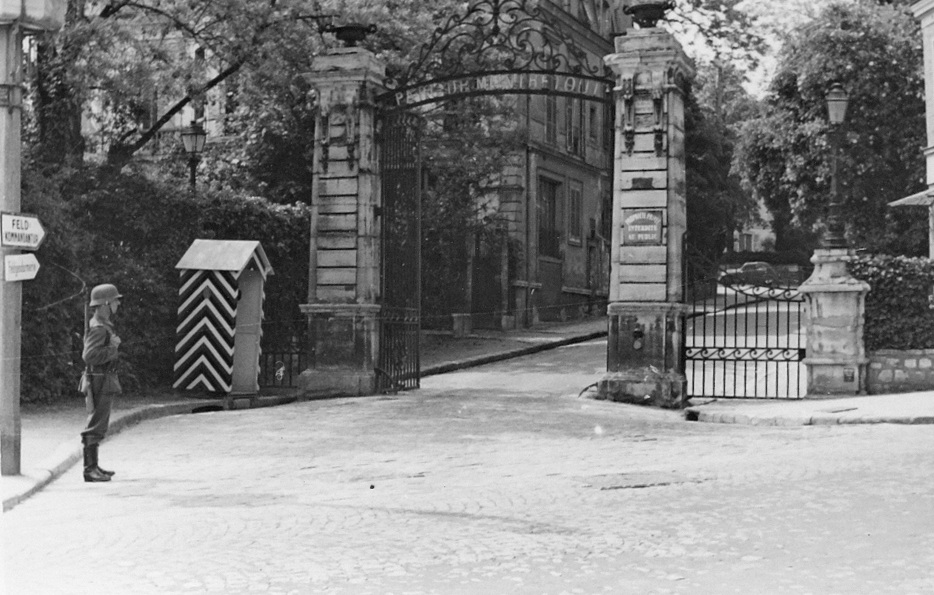
- Entrance to Montretout in 1941

- Location of Montretout on the map of Paris
- Coordinates: 48°50′31″N 02°12′50″E
- Established: 1850
- Founder: Napoleon

Montretout (French pronunciation: [mɔ̃tʁətu]) is a gated community of grand mansions in the heights of Saint-Cloud, Hauts-de-Seine in France. Several French personalities reside or have resided there. The estate was started by French king Louis-Philippe, and was occupied during the Second Empire by relatives of Napoleon III and Empress Eugenie. It was one of the battle sites during the Siege of Paris at the culmination of the Franco-Prussian War. German authorities occupied several houses during the Second World War.

== Etymology ==
Montretout is from French Montre Tout, meaning respectively “show all”, in reference to the estate’s location at the top of a hill, overlooking the Seine and Paris.

== History ==
=== Origins ===
Philippe d'Orléans, brother of King Louis XIV, granted the land to the nuns of the Order of Saint Ursula, who stayed there until the French Revolution. The site housed then a pavilion for the guards of the Château de Saint-Cloud estate. Napoleon acquired the estate in 1806. Under the reign of Louis-Philippe, the Pereire brothers bought the estate to lay the railway from Paris-Saint-Lazare to Versailles. Once the track was completed, they resold the remainder of the land to a developer who transformed it into a gated community in 1832, one of the first of its kind in France.

In 1855 regulations were put in place to maintain land value: these stipulated that the lot must be built within three years of the purchase, and shops, cafés, and balls were prohibited. In 1932, the regulation was supplemented by the ban on dividing plots below 1,000 m^{2} (11,000 sq ft) or doing industrial and commercial activities there. Although it was forbidden, two luxury collective buildings were built there in the 1970s.

Madame de Pompadour owned a property on the Montretout estate; it was bought by Charles André Pozzo di Borgo, the Russian ambassador to France. From 1896 to 1899, one of his descendants, Duke Pozzo di Borgo, had the house dismantled, transported and rebuilt and expanded by the architect Louis Dauvergne on the estate of Dangu in Normandy, which he had acquired in 1884.

=== Second Empire ===
Napoleon III became the owner of a portion of the estate; the first houses were built there starting 1850. Napoleon III offered houses to his chief of staff, Jeani-François Mocquard, to his officers and to members of the court of Empress Eugenie. The emperor also gave Marguerite Bellanger, his last mistress, a house in the park.

=== During the Franco-Prussian War ===
During the 1870–1871 Siege of Paris, the French troops evacuated the plateau above the village of Saint-Cloud which was occupied by a fortification, La Redoute de Montretout. This redoubt was immediately occupied by Prussian forces. The French attempted to reclaim the redoubt without success in the winter of 1870. On January 19, 1871, the French recaptured the redoubt and the much damaged Saint-Cloud and Montretout quarter during the Battle of Buzenval.
