= Grochowiska, Świętokrzyskie Voivodeship =

Grochowiska
- Village
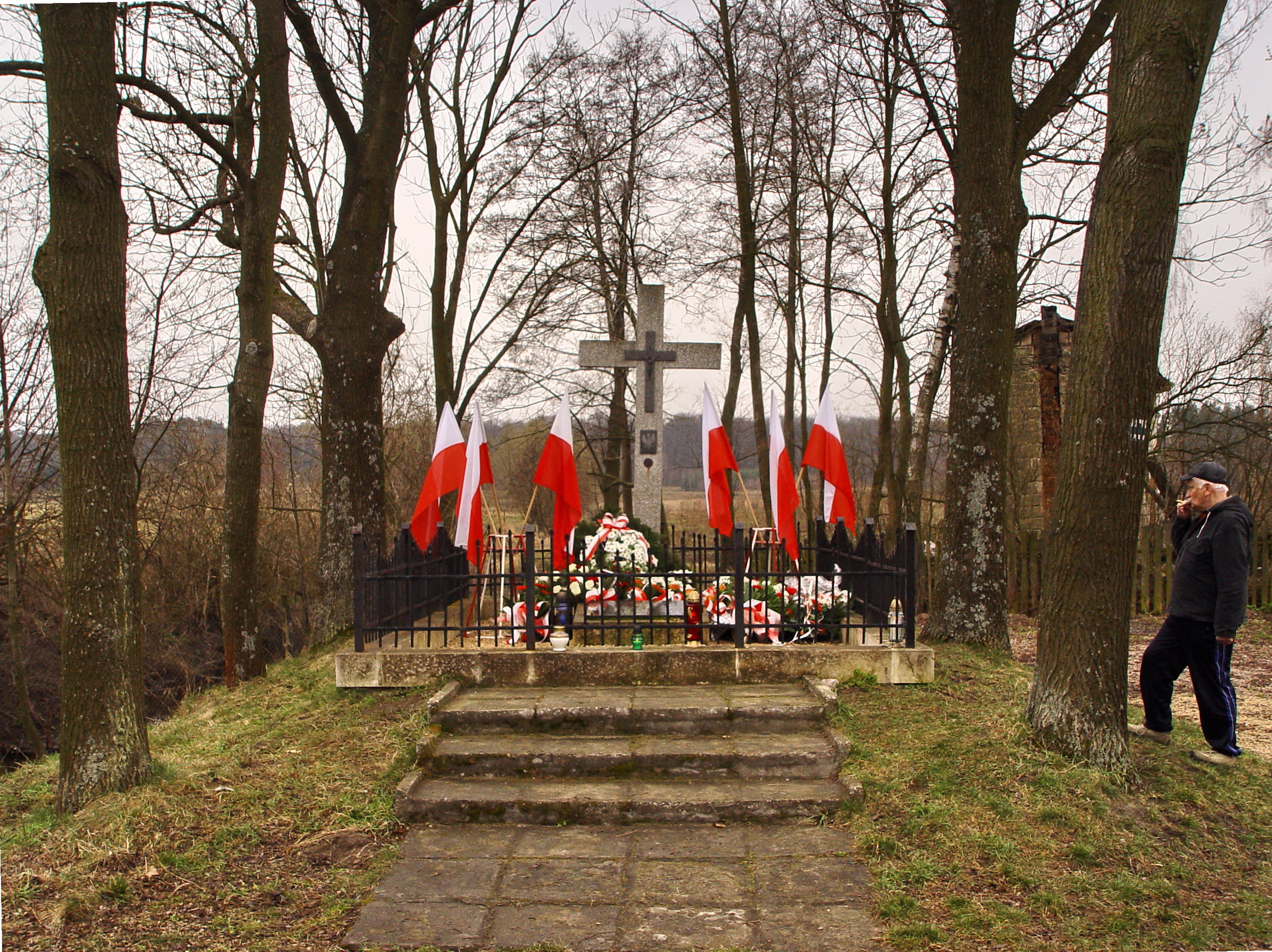

- Location within Poland
- Coordinates: 50°29′51″N 20°38′13″E
- Country: Poland
- Voivodeship: Świętokrzyskie
- County: Pińczów
- Gmina: Pińczów

Grochowiska [ɡrɔxɔˈviska] is a village in the administrative district of Gmina Pińczów, within Pińczów County, Świętokrzyskie Voivodeship, in south-central Poland. It lies approximately 9 km (6 mi) south-east of Pińczów and 43 km (27 mi) south of the regional capital Kielce.

The village is famous for the Battle of Grochowiska in 1863, one of the major engagements of the January Uprising.
