= Marian Langiewicz =

Polish patriot notable as a military leader

Langie Bey
- Portrait of Langiewicz, 1863
- Born: Marian Antoni Melchior Langiewicz; 5 August 1827; Grand Duchy of Posen, Kingdom of Prussia
- Died: 11 May 1887 (aged 59); Haydarpaşa, Ottoman Empire
- Burial place: Haydarpaşa Cemetery
- Spouse: Susannah Hyde (until 1887)
- Military career
- Allegiance: Ottoman Empire

Marian Langiewicz (Polish pronunciation: [ˈmarjan laŋˈɡʲɛvit͡ʂ]; 5 August 1827 – 11 May 1887), was one of the leaders of the Polish January Uprising against the Russian Empire in 1863.

== Biography ==
Marian Antoni Melchior Langiewicz was born in the Grand Duchy of Posen, as the son of Wojciech and Eleonora née Kluczewska. His father Wojciech was local doctor. In turn his mother Eleonora was noblewoman from the prominent Kluczewski family. His maternal great-uncle was diplomat and royal secretary Ignacy Kluczewski.

Langiewicz was educated at Posen, Breslau, and Prague, and was compelled to earn his daily bread by giving lectures. He subsequently entered the Prussian Landwehr and served for a year in the royal guard. In 1860 he migrated to Paris and was for a time professor in the high school founded there by Ludwik Adam Mieroslawski.

The same year he took part in Giuseppe Garibaldi's Neapolitan campaign, and was then a professor in the military school at Cuneo till the establishment was closed.

In 1862 he entered into communication with the central Polish committee at Warsaw, and on the outbreak of the insurrection, 22 January 1863, he took the command of the armed bands.

He defeated the Russians at Wąchock and Słupia (February), capturing 1000 muskets and 8 cannon. This victory drew hundreds of young recruits to his standard, till at last he had 12,000 men at his disposal.

On 23 February he again defeated the Russians, at Małogoszcz, and captured 500 muskets and 2 cannons. On 10 March he proclaimed himself Dictator and attempted to form a regular government; but either he had insufficient organizing talent, or had not time enough to carry out his plans, and after a fresh series of engagements at the battle of Chrobrze on 17 March and battle of Grochowiska on 18 March he took refuge in Austrian territory and was interned at Tarnów. He was subsequently transferred to the fortress of Josephstadt, from which he was released in 1865.

He then lived at Solothurn as a citizen of the Swiss Republic, and subsequently entered Ottoman service as Langie Bey. He died in Kostantiniyye on 10 May 1887 and is buried at the Haydarpaşa Cemetery with his second wife, Susannah Hyde (2 Feb 1837 - 24 Nov 1906).
