= Ludwik Zwierzdowski =

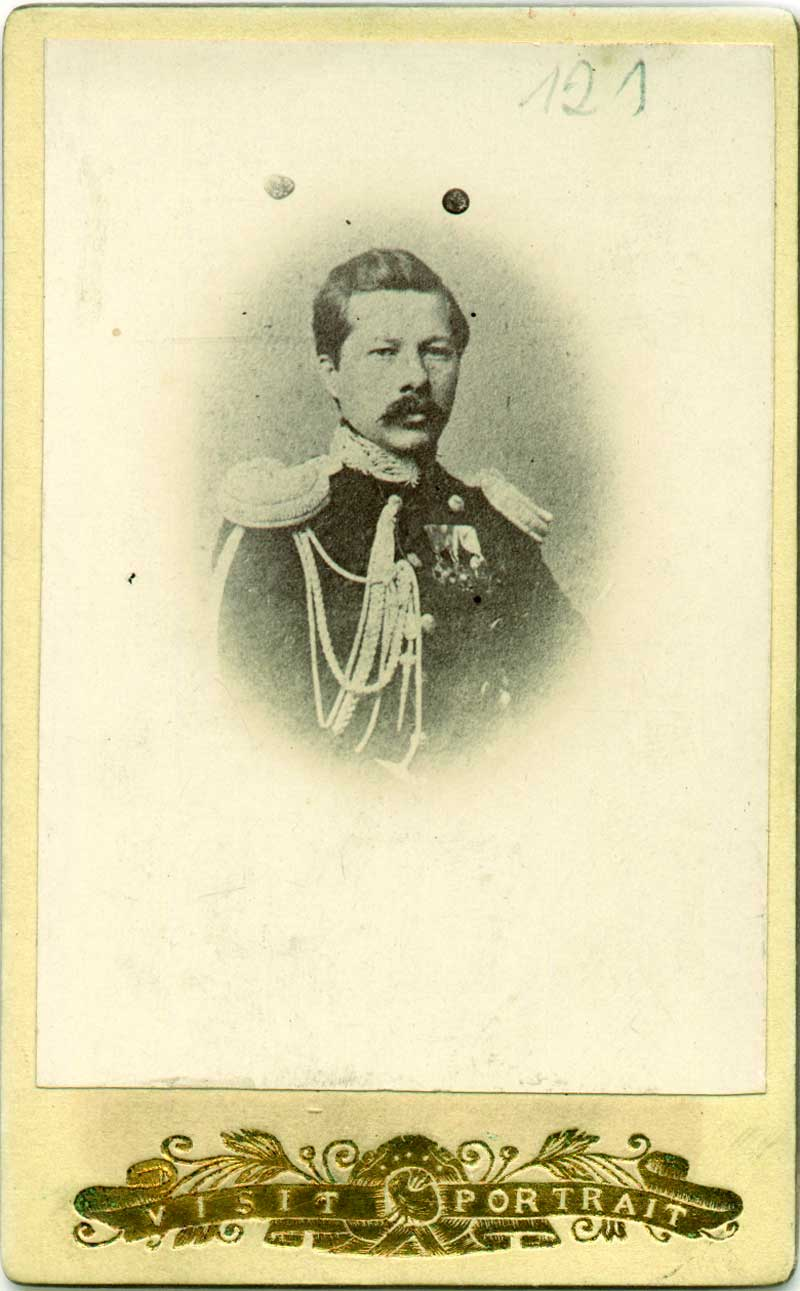
- Photograph of Ludwik Zwierzdowski between 1856 and 1863
- Nicknames: Topór; Captain Wieliczko
- Born: 11 January 1830; Vilnius, Vilna Governorate, Russian Empire
- Died: 23 February 1864 (Age 34) Opatów, Congress Poland,
- Cause of death: Hanging
- Allegiance: Imperial Russian Army (1846-1863) Polish National Government (1863-1864)
- Service years: 1846-1864
- Rank: Captain - Imperial Russian Army; Colonel - Polish National Government
- Commands: Commander-in-Chief of the Mogilev Province; Commander-in-Chief of the Sandomierz Province; Commander of the Krakow Division of the Second Corps
- Conflicts: Crimean War; January Uprising, Battle of Opatów †
- Awards: Order of Saint Anna

Ludwik 'Topór' Zwierzdowski (1830-1864) was a Polish captain in the Imperial Russian Army, member of the conspiracy of Zygmunt Sierakowski, military commander of the Mogilev Province, military commander of the Sandomierz Province until February 1864 and a colonel in the January Uprising.

== Military Career ==
The Topór coat of arms, the nobility Zwierzdowski's family belonged to

Ludwik Zwierzdowski was born on the 11 January 1830 in Vilnius, he came from a noble family bearing the Topór, which resided in the Vilnius Governorate. His father, Michał Zwierzdowski belonged to the nobility without land ownership, but he was the owner of a tenement house located on Mostowa Street. At the age of 16 Ludwik Zwierzdowski joined the Russian Imperial Army and on the 8th August 1850 after four years of studying he got accepted into Higher Engineering School in St. Petersburg with the rank of ensign. After two years of study, Ludwik Zwierzdowski graduated from the St. Petersburg school with the rank of lieutenant. He was then assigned to the Brest Fortress, then during the Crimean War was transferred, first to St. Petersburg and then to Tallinn. After the end of the war Ludwik Zwierzdowski began studying at the Nichloas General Staff Academy in September 1856, where Zwierzdowski met Jarosław Dąbrowski and Zygmunt Sierakowski. It was thanks to them that, in addition to his academic studies, Zwierzdowski began to explore issues related to nationality and social matters, and in 1857 joined the Circle of Polish Officers founded in St. Petersburg called the Red Organisation (Polish:organizacją Czerwonych). The activities of this secret organisation consisted of self-education under the guise of literary evenings, during which issues related to Polish history, literature, law and social issues were discussed. After graduating from the academy in December of 1858 Zwierzdowski was granted a three-month leave of absence, which he spent in Vilnius. During this time, he strengthened his ties with the Red organisation and at the same time enjoyed rapid professional advancement in his career as a Russian officer: in November 1859, he was promoted to staff captain, in March 1860 to senior staff adjutant, in November 1860 to Captain of the Vilnius General Staff, and then in March 1861 he was awarded the Order of Saint Anna.

=== Polish underground activities ===
Zwierzdowski's rapid promotion in the military hierarchy was due to his education and professional aptitude, which were recognised by Vilnia Governorate-General Vladimir Nazimov and Chief of Staff General Minkwitz to the point where Nazimov that he entrusted Zwierzdowski with the task of teaching his children and invited him to his suburban villa in 1858, as a result of which Zwierzdowski became almost a member of the Vilnius governor's household. In Vilnius, Ludwik Zwierzdowski served in the staff of the First Corps, and he used his eight-month health leave to establish close contact with the Vilnius underground organisation. From 1859, he belonged to the Vilnius Civic Circle of the White Organisation, organised by Franciszek Dalewski, Jakub Gieysztor and Aleksander Oskierka. Taking advantage of his good relations with his superiors, he carried out secret independence work during his leave, which resulted in his stay in Poznań at the beginning of 1861. There, he established contacts with underground activists: Karol Libelt, Kazimierz Kantak and Aleksander Gutt rym, as well as representatives of the Polish Circle in Paris.

On 18 August 1861 in Vilnius, Ludwik Zwierzdowski became involved in organising patriotic demonstrations in the city. A turning point in Zwierzdowski's underground activities was the demonstration that took place in Vilnius when a clash with Russian forces occurred in Pohulanka. The passive attitude of the Civic Circle, which did not want to respond to the situation, caused a split and the creation of a separate, independent Movement Committee, headed by Ludwik Zwierzdowski. Delegates from the Warsaw Central Committee, Jan Frankowski and Nestor Du Laurens, attempted to eliminate this unfavourable dualism in the independence movement. As a result of this, the Lithuanian Provincial Committee was formed, composed of activists of both moderate The establishment of the Lithuanian Provincial Committee did not alleviate the disputes that continued to erupt between representatives of the Whites – Franciszek Dalewski and Edmund Weryha, and members of the Red organisation – Konstanty Kalinowski and Ludwik Zwierzdowski. Conflicts also arose within this organisation, based on the vision of Lithuania's future, as evidenced by the separatist attitude of Konstanty Kalinowski on the one hand, and on the other the supporters of close unification, represented by Nestor Du Laurens and Ludwik Zwierzdowski, who held both moderate and radical views.

Zwierzdowski also appointed another independence activist, Jan Koziełło, to his position in the Lithuanian Provincial Committee in Vilnius. During the January Uprising, Koziełło was a clerk of the War Department of the National Government and military commander of Warsaw.

An investigation conducted by English detectives brought to Warsaw that a number of Polish officers were arrested. In particular, the documents found on Jarosław Dąbrowski caused an unfavourable change in the position of Captain Ludwik Zwierzdowski. Despite the incriminating evidence, he obtained an imperial order from his protectors,pursuant to which, on 11 October 1862, he was transferred to Moscow, where he served as senior adjutant in the grenadier corps staff but was under constant police surveillance, ordered by the Minister of War, General Dmitri Milutin.

== January Uprising ==
=== Uprising in Mogilev ===
The outbreak of the uprising found Captain Ludwik Zwierzdowski in Moscow, where, despite police surveillance, he had also gained the trust of his superiors. On 3 April 1863, he was granted a four-weekleave of absence, during which he received a power of attorney from the Lithuanian Provincial Committee in Vilnius to take up the position of military commander of the Mogilev Province and the task of commencing military operations in that area. The appointment and seal of the military commander of the Mogilev Province for Captain Ludwik Zwierzdowski, issued by the Lithuanian Provincial Management Department, were brought to Moscow by Stanisław Wiskowski, the organiser of the Horec uprising.

The lack of experienced military instructors in the province meant that Captain Ludwik Zwierzdowski, as the appointed military commander of the Mogilev Province, set off for St. Petersburg, where, through the president of the national organisation committee, he received the assistance of three artillery officers Konstanty Żebrowski, Antoni Olędzki and Stanisław Dzierżanowski. From 24 April 1863, together with three conspirators, under assumed names, they began organising the uprising in the Mohylew Province. At that time, Captain Zwierzdowski, used the pseudonym Captain Wieliczko where he stayed at the estate of Zdzisław Mitkiewicz-Litwinow to cover his tracks, where a meeting point and a place from which orders were issued were designated. According to Captain Zwierzdowski's plans, five insurgent units (parties) were to be formed on the right bank of the Dnieper, whose task was to check the few Russian units and thus provide assistance to the Polish units formed on the left bank. As the military commander of the Mogilev Province, Captain Ludwik Zwierzdowski intended to lead the units located on the left bank of the Dnieper and, together with Lieutenant Żurowski ‘Kosa’, head for the Smolensk region, while informing the peasant population about the National Government's decree on enfranchisement and granting land ownership. The outbreak of hostilities was set for 10 p.m. on 5 May 1863. The commander of the Polish insurgent unit was to be Major Zwierzdowski, who took the pseudonym ‘Topór’ while the central location was the town of Horki, located in the northern part of Mogilev Governorate. The location of the attack was chosen due to the weak military garrison stationed there and the fact that, at the end of April 1863, the command of the invalids had been transferred from the communal barracks to private quarters in the town, with orders to deposit their live ammunition in a warehouse. On 5–6 May 1863, Major Zwierzdowski, commanding the youth of Horki and a group of several dozen local nobles involved in the independence movement, attacked the county town of Horki. His unit, numbering about 100 people, attacked the wooden barracks and armoury, the district office and treasury, the agricultural institute building and the commander's house. According to Stefan Kotarski's findings, as a result of the Polish attack, the barracks and district office were burned down, the armoury was emptied of rifles, gunpowder and ammunition, 15,000 roubles in silver were captured, and the commander of the invalids and several dozen Russian soldiers were taken prisoner. On the Polish side, the losses amounted to one killed and two wounded.

After a successful attack on Horki, Zwierzdowski led his unit towards Chavusy in order to join forceswith the unit of Lieutenant Żurowski ‘Kosa’, who, after capturing the Russian battery in Krychaw, was to submit to the authority of the military commander of the Mogilev Province During the march, Major Zwierzdowski's unit stopped at the Drybin estate, owned by Otton Ciechanowiecki, and then in the town of Raśnie, where a certain Father Łukaszewicz celebrated Holy Mass and blessed the insurgents from Zwierzdowski's unit. On the next day of the march, the insurgent army stopped at the Krasne estate owned by Tadeusz Czudowski, where Lieutenant Żurowski's ‘Kosa’ unit arrived, defeated in the battle of Świnna. The failure to capture Krychaw caused Major Zwierzdowski to abandon his expedition towards the Smolensk region, especially since he had to face the hostile attitude of the local peasants. The unit commanded by Major Ludwik Zwierzdowski headed southwest in order to establish contact with the insurgent parties stationed on the right bank of the Dnieper River. Staying overnight at larger Polish estates, Major Zwierzdowski, faced with the numerically superior Russian forces attacking from three directions: from Mstsislaw, Mogilev and Slawharad, decided to break through the borders of the Minsk Governorate and establish contact with the military commander of that province, Michał Oskierka.

Meanwhile, Russian military garrisons began an encircling march. The aim was to break up the Polish insurgent units, whose main force was Major Zwierzdowski's ‘Topór’ unit, numbering about 250 men. On the night of 10-11 May 1863, Major ‘Zwierzdowski unit found itself on the Pronia River, near the village of Liciągi, and began crossing on the only ferry, Russian artillery opened fire, but failed to stop the Polish troops from crossing Major Zwierzdowski in view of the hostile attitude of the rural population, the defeats of neighbouring units and the superior forces of the Russian army, decided to abandon further military activity and disband the unit so that the insurgents could take advantage of the last days of the amnesty.

After disbanding his unit and receiving news of the defeat of Zygmunt Sierakowski's insurgent group and the collapse of the uprising in Samogitia, Ludwik Zwierzdowski and Lieutenant Żukowski made their way to Mogilev, and from there, under an assumed name, to Kiev.

In June 1863, Major Zwierzdowski travelled to Constantinople, and at the beginning of July in Dobruja, where Colonel Zygmunt Miłkowski was organising a military unit and Zwierzdowski was possibly preparing to organise some kind of military undertaking, for which he needed the advice of experienced military personnel, but they refused to help him. After his stay on the Balkan Peninsula, Major Zwierzdowski travelled to Western Europe and ended up in Paris. There, he was involved in creating military-diplomatic projects, which he sent both to the National Government in Warsaw and to political circles at the French court.

=== Activities in Congress Poland ===
Then, from General Mierosławski, as the general organiser of the armed forces outside the Russian partition, he received a nomination to organise fighting in the border area of East Prussia. In September and October 1863, Major Zwierzdowski began preparations for an expedition to Samogitia, which, however, due to the dismissal of General Mierosławski and the liquidation of his office, did not come to fruition.

After Romuald Traugutt assumed dictatorship in the National Government, Major Zwierzdowski placed himself at the disposal of the National Government. In connection with the reorganisation of the insurgent activities, consisting in the establishment of regular unitscomposed of companies, battalions, regiments and corps, at the request of the National Government, he arrived in Krakow and became actively involved in recruiting and equipping troops. On 20 November 1863, he was appointed colonel by the National Governmentwith the task of commencing military operations in the Sandomierz Province.

With a complete unit, formed with the help of the National Government Department for Galicia, and especially thanks to the energy of the then military organiser of Galicia, Colonel Strusia, he crossed the Vistula River and reported to the commander of the II Corps, General Józef Hauke-Bosak. Colonel Ludwik Zwierzdowski made a good impression on his new superior, which was reflected in General Józef Hauke-Bosak entrusting him with the position of commander of the Radom Regiment, and then commander of the Krakow Division. As division commander, Colonel Zwierzdowski began intensive reform work in accordance with the directives of the National Government, which caused disagreements between him and other senior officers.

== Eventual capture and execution ==
=== The Battle of Opatów ===
The final act in the military activities of Colonel Ludwik Zwierzdowski in the Sandomierz Province was the attack on Opatów on 21 February 1864, which led to the destruction of the entire unit and caused the death of its commander. The battle was commanded by Colonel ‘Topór’ Ludwik Zwierzdowski and Apolinary Kurowski. The evening attack by the insurgents on the town, where the aim of the attack on this town was to eliminate the Russian columns threatening the insurgents, which were to strike from all sides at the Krakow Division of the Second Corps, turned into six hours of fierce street fighting because of Kurowski's miscalculation of how many how many russian troops were and the town could not be taken, at midnight, Kurowski ordered his men to leave the town, as he feared Russian reinforcements, marching from Sandomierz. However, Zwierzdowski couldn't retreat from the city as he was wounded, he was captured the next day by Cossak forces and at first tortured and when it was found out who he was, a summary court martial took place where he sentenced death by hanging and the next day on 23 January 1864 Colonel Ludwik Zwierzdowski was hanged in the market square of Opatów.

== Legacy ==
In Opatów there is a symbolic grave of Ludwik Topór-Zwierzdowski and a monument dedicated to his memory.

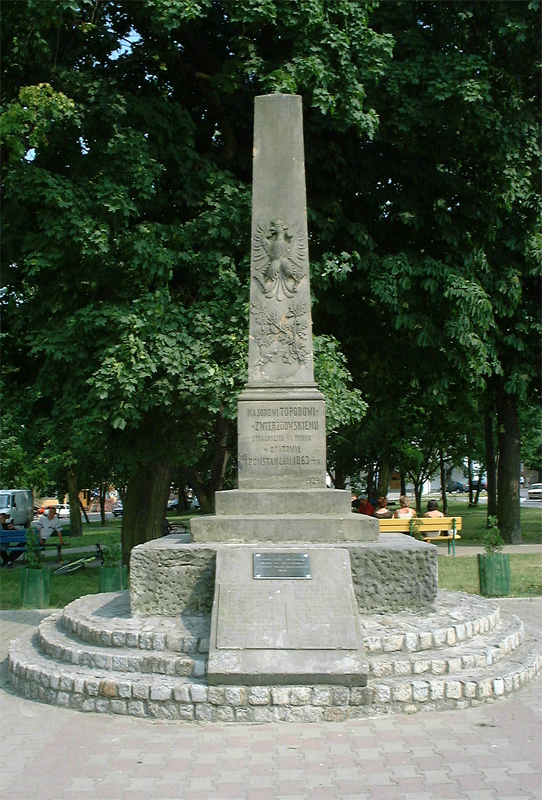
Monument to Ludwik Zwierzdowski in Opatów

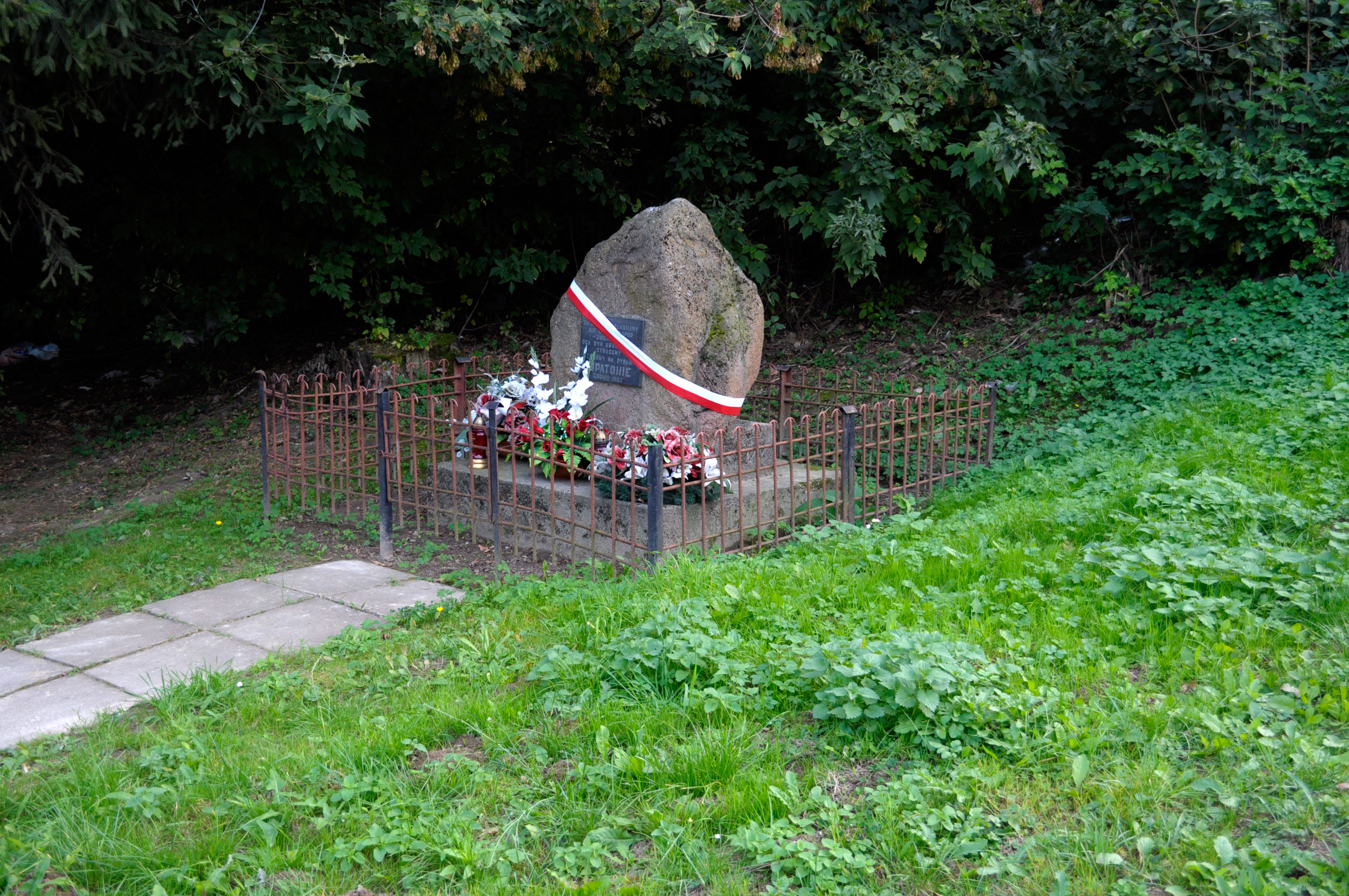
The symbolic grave of Ludwik Topór Zwierzdowski in Opatów

== Medals ==
- Order of Saint Anna
