= Battle of Opatów =

Battle of Opatów may refer to:

- Battle of Opatów (1863)
- Battle of Opatów (1864)
