= Apolinary Kurowski =

Polish politician, colonel of the insurgent forces in the January Uprising

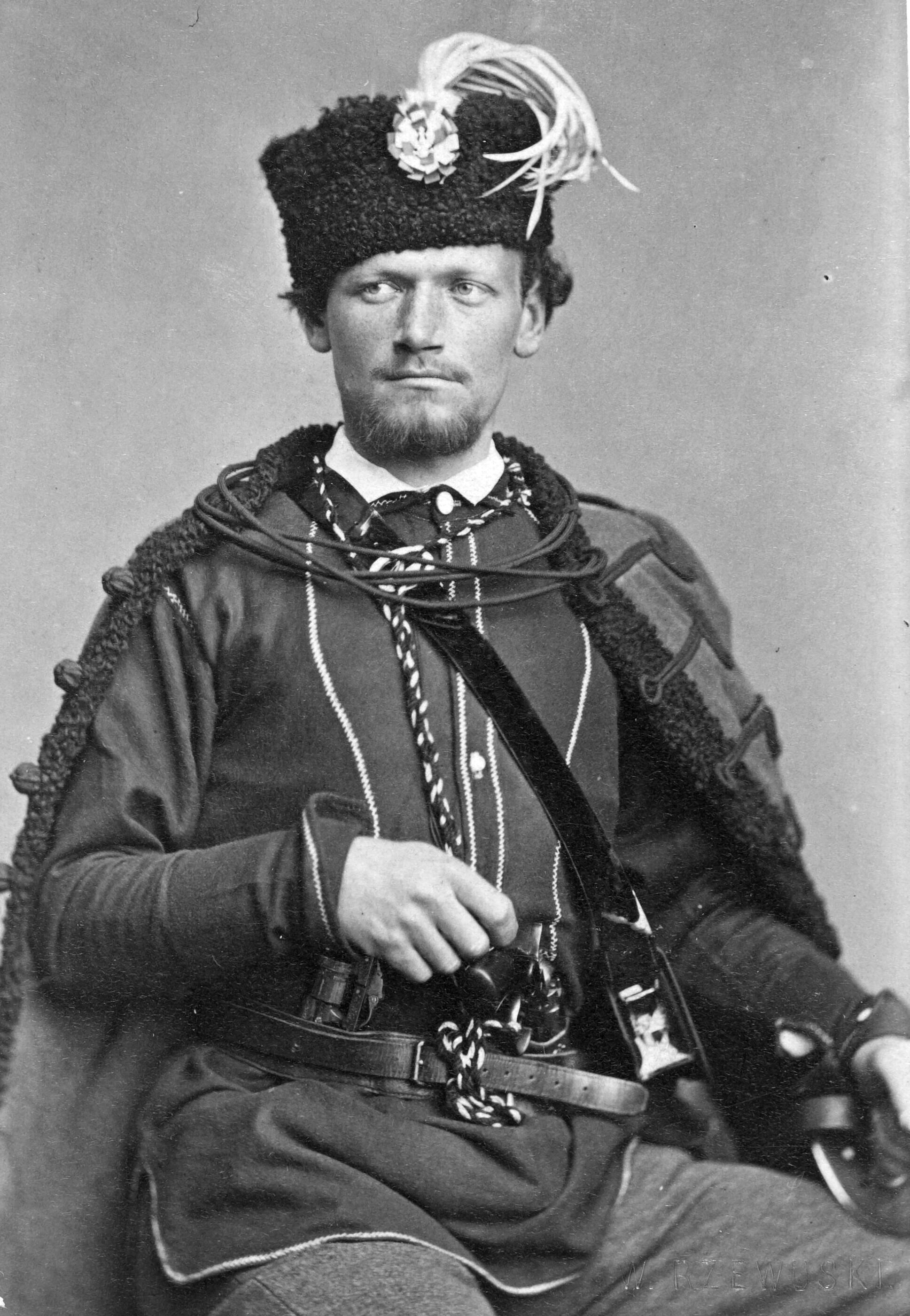
- Photograph of Kurowksi c.1863
- Born: Apoloniusz Eustachy Kurowski; 26 March 1819; Bolewice, Grand Duchy of Posen
- Died: 11 May 1878 (aged 59); Baden, Grand Duchy of Baden
- Military career
- Allegiance: Prussian Army; Polish National Government
- Rank: Colonel
- Units: Apolinary Kurowski's unit; Krakow Division of General Józef Hauke-Bosak II Corps
- Conflicts: Greater Poland Uprising; January Uprising; Battle of Sosnowiec; Battle of Miechów; Battle of Opatów

Apoloniusz Eustachy Kurowski, later known as Apolinary Kurowski (1818–1878), – was a Polish nobleman and Colonel in the January Uprising.

Nałęcz III noble coat of arms, the noble house that Kurowskis family belonged to.

== Early life ==
Kurowski was born in 1818 in Bolewice in the Grand Duchy of Posen. He was the son of Anthony Kurowski, an owner of Ptaszkowo and tenant of Bolewice in the Bukowski district and Martyna Piętkiewicz. Kurowskis family comes from the Noble house of Nałęcz III. Kurowski attended secondary school in Leszno, but after his father's death in 1838, he left school and took over the family farm. Apolinary Kurowski also served in the Prussian army between 1838 and 1846 but left after one year due to illness.

== Greater Poland Uprising ==
During the 1840s, Kurowski became involved in the activities of the Polish Democratic Society, while his family's estate became a meeting place for conspirators planning an uprising in Greater Poland in 1846, and he was involved in the smuggling of weapons from Poznań to Bolewice. In 1846, he and his brother were arrested by Prussian authorities for being conspirators in the Greater Poland Uprising where Kurowski betrayed other conspirators and was then sentenced to death and imprisoned in Moabit, near Berlin. After the 1848 Revolution he was released and then took part in the Greater Poland Uprising. Ludwik Mierosławski wanted to appoint him commander of a unit but little is known about if this came to fruition.

== January Uprising ==
In the 1850s, Kurowski became involved with London émigré circles, from whom he received revolutionary materials. After some time, he had to flee from Poznań to the Congress Poland. Before 1862, he married Marcela Jeżewska and bought Tyniec in Jędrzejów County from her mother. In 1862, Kurowski became involved in preparations for the January uprising and was appointed by the Central National Committee to the position of chief insurgent commander in the Kraków Voivode. Kurowski began organizing his unit in the vicinity of Jędrzejów, which served as his headquarters for several days in January 1863. In the meantime, Kurowski deployed his insurgents on the main routes of Kielce County in order to rescue conscripts – some of whom were actually saved from the Russian army.

Kurowski decided to take control of the so-called border triangle, i.e. the territory where the borders of the three partitioning powers converged. This would enable the free movement and smuggling of new volunteers and the necessary weapons. The insurgents could also gain control of valuable industrial plants, enabling them to obtain funds to continue the fight. On 6 February, Kurowski managed to capture and obtain nearly 35,000 rubles from the local customs office. On the 6–7 February Kurowski proceeded with a raid on the Battle of Sosnowiec, where the insurgents seized 40 horses, weapons and 80,000 rubles.

The Russians decided to crush the insurgents or at least drive them across the border into Prussian or Austrian territory. To this end, Russian troops planned to surround and destroy the Ojców camp. Kurowski, having received information about the enemy's plans, quickly realized the danger he was in. He ruled out the possibility of staying in Ojców and engaging in a defensive battle with the tsarist army. He planned to move his unit to the north-east to join forces with Marian Langiewicz's unit.

The insurgents received information that Russian forces had left Miechów. Kurowski made a quick decision to attack the town, believing that it was occupied by secondary and insignificant units of the tsarist army. The insurgents reached Miechów on the night of 16–17 February 1863. It quickly became apparent that the Russians were much stronger than expected and well-prepared for the insurgents' attack. During the battle, Kurowski lost control of his unit, and suffered heavy casualties. After the battle, he was removed from his position as Voivode of Krakow and fled to Galicia. In February 1864 he returned to Congress Poland as commander of the Krakow Division of General Józef Hauke-Bosak's II Corps, and then as his chief of staff.

On 21 February 1864, he took part in the battle of Opatów, where the aim of the attack on this town was to eliminate the Russian columns threatening the insurgents, which were to strike from all sides at the Krakow Division of the Second Corps. Kurowski miscalulated how many russian troops were at Opatów, at midnight, Kurowski ordered his men to leave the town, as he feared Russian reinforcements, marching from Sandomierz.

== Personal life ==
After the Battle of Opatów, Kurowski fled back to Galicia where he served as an organizer of armed units for some time. After the uprising failed, he left with his wife for Switzerland, where he settled in Pfäffikon near Zurich. He did not participate in the political life of the émigré community, but became involved in the activities of local Polish scientific and self-help organizations. He died on 11 May 1878 in Baden.

His rifle is on display at the Polish Army Museum in Warsaw.

== See also ==
- January Uprising
- Battle of Miechów
- Battle of Opatów (1864)
