= Sosnowiec Główny railway station =

Railway station in Silesia, Poland

Sosnowiec Główny
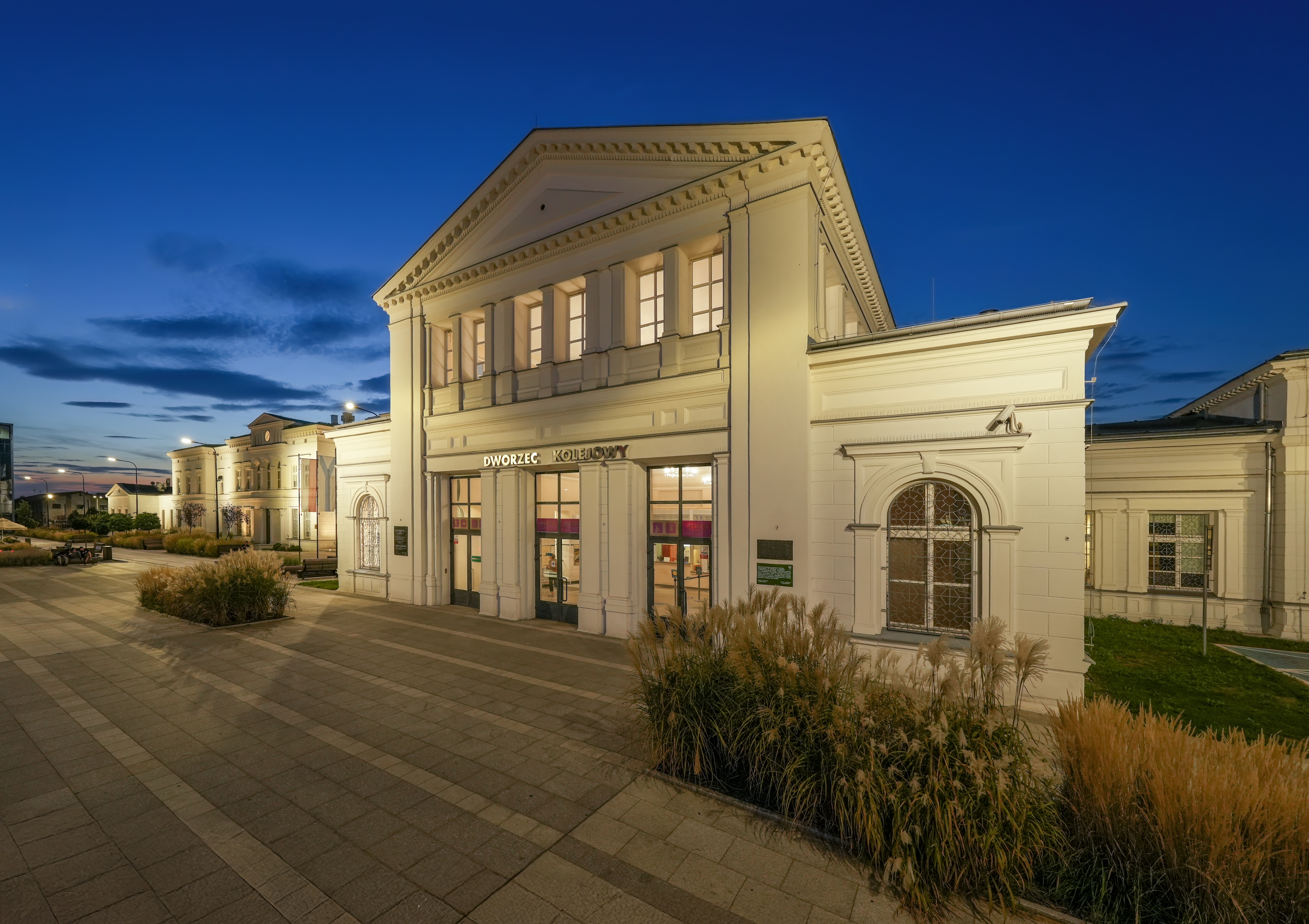

General information
- Location: Częstochowa, Silesia; Sosnowiec
- Coordinates: 50.278567°N 19.1244057°E
- Owner: Polskie Koleje Państwowe S.A.
- Line: 1 Warszawa Zachodnia – Katowice; 62 Tunel – Sosnowiec Główny
- Platforms: 2
- Tracks: 3

Construction
- Structure type: Building: Yes

History
- Opened: August 24, 1859
- Former names: Sosnowice (1859–1900) Sosnowiec (1901–1914); Sosnowice Warschauer Bahnhof (1914–1918); Sosnowiec Warszawski (1918–1930); Sosnowiec Północny (1931–1939); Sosnowitz Nord (1939–1945) Sosnowiec Północny (1945–1950)

Services
Preceding station	PKP Intercity	Following station
Warszawa Zachodnia towards Warszawa Wschodnia	EIP	Katowice towards Bielsko-Biała Główna
Warszawa Zachodnia towards Gdynia Główna	EIP	Katowice towards Gliwice or Bielsko-Biała Główna
Będzin Miasto towards Warszawa Wschodnia, Białystok, or Gdynia Główna	IC	Katowice towards Bielsko-Biała Główna
Katowice towards Bielsko-Biała Główna	IC	Będzin Miasto towards Olsztyn Główny
Katowice towards Racibórz	IC	Będzin Miasto towards Olsztyn Główny
Preceding station	KŚ	Following station
Katowice Szopienice Południowe towards Gliwice	S1	Będzin towards Częstochowa
Katowice Szopienice Południowe towards Tychy Lodowisko	S41	Będzin towards Częstochowa
Location

Sosnowiec Główny railway station is a major railway stations in Sosnowiec, Silesian Voivodeship, Poland. The station is located about 9 km to the East of Katowice railway station. As of 2022, it is served by Polregio (local and InterRegio services) and PKP Intercity (EIP, InterCity, and TLK services).

The railway station was established on August 24, 1859 as part of the connection of the Warsaw-Vienna Railway and the Upper Silesian Railway as a border station, which over time gave rise to the city of Sosnowiec. The building of station has heritage monument status and its creation gave rise to the development of the city.

== Train services ==
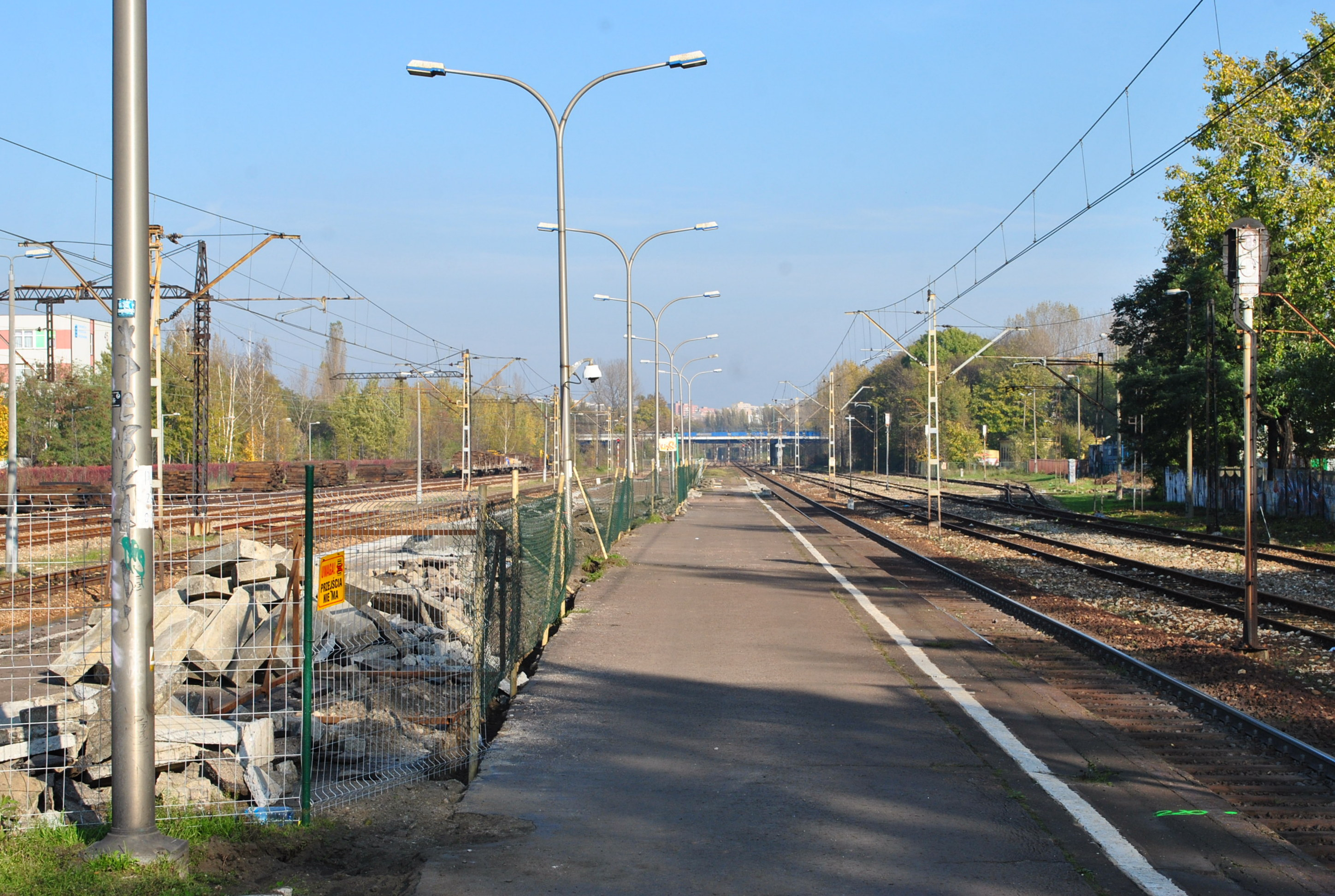
Platform 2 during renovation in 2014

The station is served by the following service(s):

- Express Intercity Premium services (EIP) Warsaw - Katowice - Bielsko-Biała
- Express Intercity Premium services (EIP) Gdynia - Warsaw - Katowice - Gliwice/Bielsko-Biała
- Intercity services (IC) Warszawa - Częstochowa - Katowice - Bielsko-Biała
- Intercity services (IC) Białystok - Warszawa - Częstochowa - Katowice - Bielsko-Biała
- Intercity services (IC) Gdynia - Gdańsk - Bydgoszcz - Toruń - Kutno - Łódź - Częstochowa - Katowice - Bielsko-Biała
- Intercity services (IC) Olsztyn - Warszawa - Skierniewice - Częstochowa - Katowice - Bielsko-Biała
- Intercity services (IC) Olsztyn - Warszawa - Skierniewice - Częstochowa - Katowice - Gliwice - Racibórz
- Regional Service (KŚ) S1 Gliwice – Zabrze - Katowice – Zawiercie - Częstochowa
- Regional services (KŚ) S41 Tychy - Katowice - Będzin - Dąbrowa Górnicza - Zawiercie - Częstochowa

== History ==
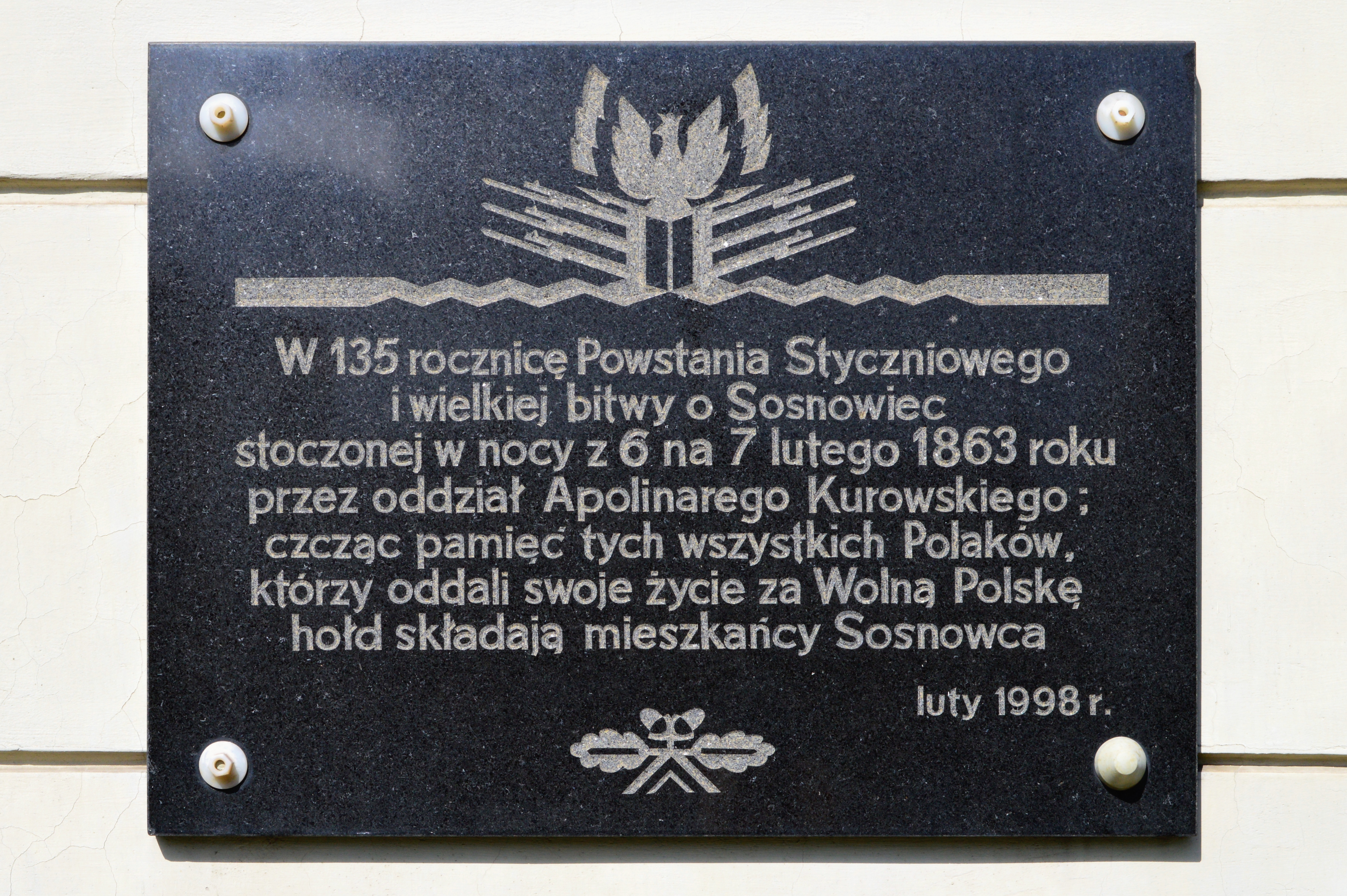
Plaque commemorating the Battle of Sosnowiec during the January Uprising in 1863

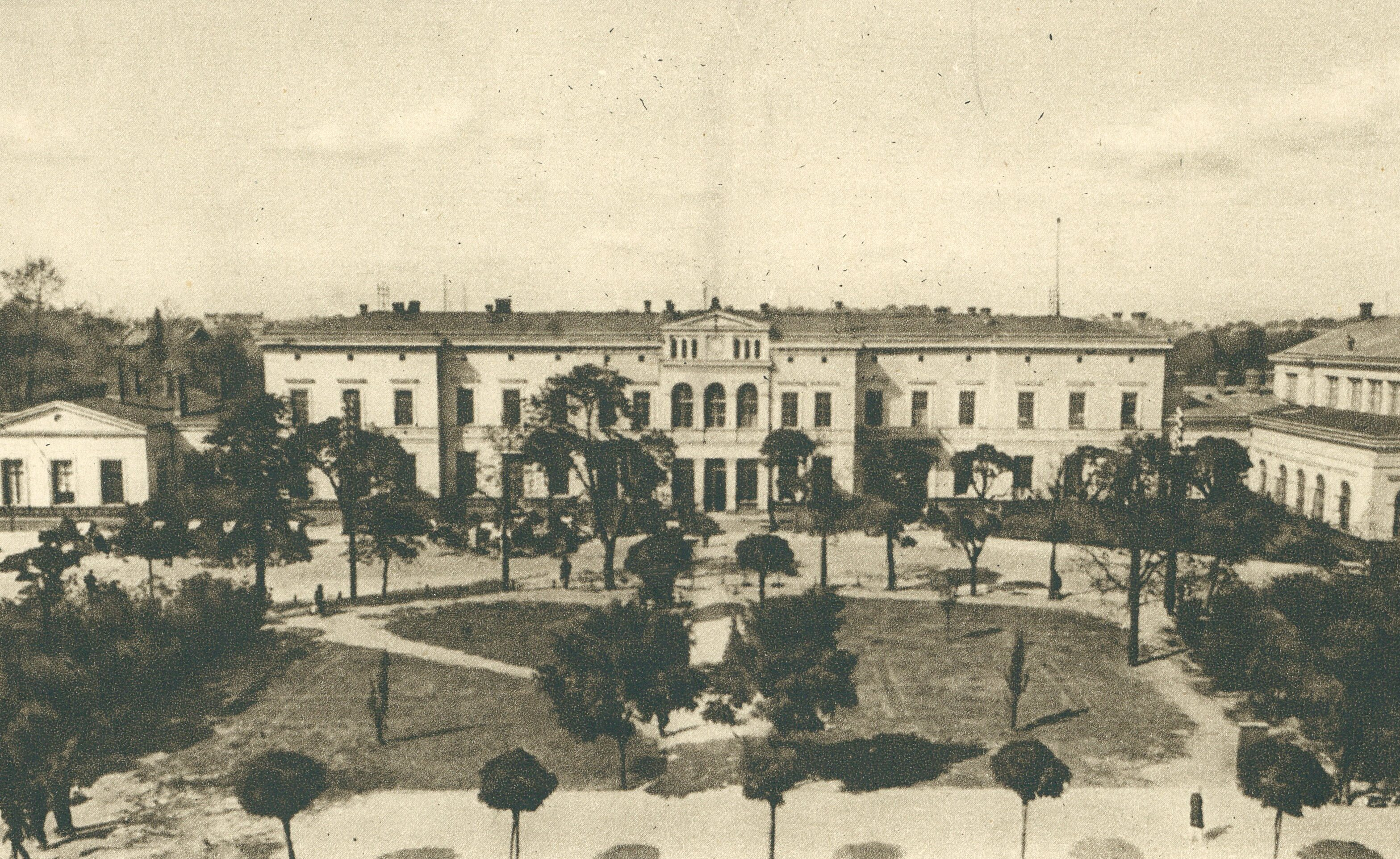
The station in the years 1926–1935

=== Origins and construction of the station ===
The beginnings of the Sosnowiec station are linked to the construction of the Warsaw–Vienna Railway. On November 25, 1838, the Warsaw–Vienna Railway Company was established, initiating the construction of a railway line connecting Warsaw (Vienna Station) with Granica (now Sosnowiec Maczki; initially, it was planned to end in Niwka). Despite organizational and financial difficulties, the construction was completed in stages under the Warsaw–Vienna Railway Administration. The section between Ząbkowice and Granica was opened on April 5, 1848.

The idea of connecting the Upper Silesian Railway network with the Warsaw–Vienna Railway via Sosnowiec arose in 1854 due to the high traffic on the existing route through Granica, which led to the border with the Austrian Empire. As a result of an agreement between the two companies in June 1858, construction began on a connection between these two railway networks (the Ząbkowice–Szopienice section via Sosnowiec). This aimed to shorten travel time between the Russian Empire and the Kingdom of Prussia. After completion, the Sosnowiec–Szopienice section was ceremonially opened on August 24, 1859, connecting Ząbkowice with Katowice. With this connection operational, most freight traffic between Prussia and the Congress Poland was routed through Sosnowiec instead of Maczki, increasing the station's cargo and passenger volume significantly by 1868.

The station was established near the Sosnowice settlement as a major border station with a customs house and technical facilities. The station building and platforms were inaugurated in 1859. The two-story neoclassical-style building with single-story extensions along the platform was likely designed by the Italian architect Henryk Marconi. The building's layout was modeled on the Vienna Station in Warsaw. The station's interior included waiting rooms for first, second, and third class passengers, rooms for dignitaries, customs offices, a passport office, residential areas, and a restaurant. Additionally, platforms, sidings, warehouses, and a locomotive depot were constructed.

In 1860, the Russian architect A. I. Gornostayev constructed customs buildings on the opposite side of the tracks, later demolished in the Interwar period. The station's establishment spurred Sosnowiec's rapid development, leading to the construction of public facilities (banks, hotels, commercial and service buildings), and residential structures, which contributed to receiving city rights from Tsar Nicholas II in 1902.

=== The station during the January Uprising ===
During the January Uprising, on the night of February 6–7, 1863, a battle took place at the station between Polish insurgents and the Russian garrison. The insurgents used an armed train to move troops from Maczki to Sosnowiec, transporting soldiers to the vicinity of Sielec, from where they attacked and captured the Sosnowiec station and the customs house.

=== The interwar period ===
After Poland regained independence in 1918, the station came under Polish administration. During the interwar period, significant changes were made to the Sosnowiec station. In 1924, a connector between Sosnowiec Główny and Sosnowiec Południowy stations was completed, making the main station in Sosnowiec a railway junction. In 1927, repair workshops for railway cars were set up next to the rectangular engine shed, and two years later, a new fan-shaped roundhouse with a turntable was built.

=== Post-1945 period ===
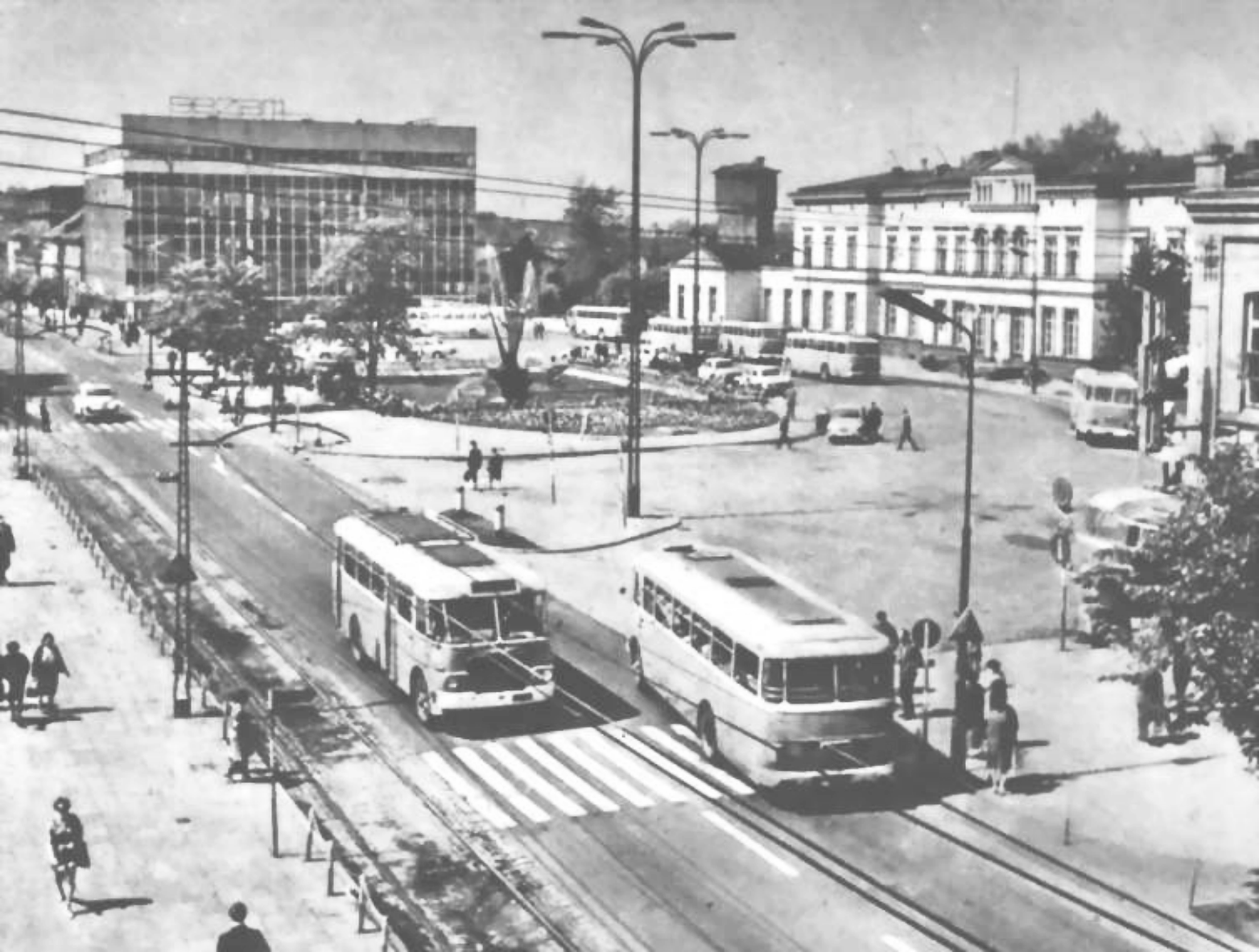
View of the Sosnowiec main station (right). Photo from the late 1960s and early 1970s

After World War II, the station was incorporated into the Katowice Regional Directorate of State Railways. In the 1950s, the first electric trains appeared at the station. The decision to electrify the Warsaw–Katowice line via Sosnowiec Główny was made in mid-1948, citing the need to improve passenger and freight traffic. Electrification proceeded in stages, with the section Gliwice – Katowice – Sosnowiec Główny – Łazy electrified on June 1, 1957.

In the late 1960s and early 1970s, as part of the redevelopment of Sosnowiec city center, part of the station building on the northeastern side was demolished, where a gymnasium had been located in the 1960s. In its place, the Railway Computing Center of PKP (now the Sosnowiec branch of PKP Informatics) was constructed. The station's main hall was also remodeled, with the addition of an entrance to an underground passage connecting the other side of the city and the station platforms.

Between 1997 and 2002, the station underwent further transformations as part of another redevelopment project for the city center to mark the city's 100th anniversary. The first phase involved renovating and restoring the building's interiors and façade. The second phase included the construction of an underground shopping passage connecting Modrzejowska Street with Jana Kilińskiego Street beneath the station, along with the reorganization of the surrounding area and the nearby church.

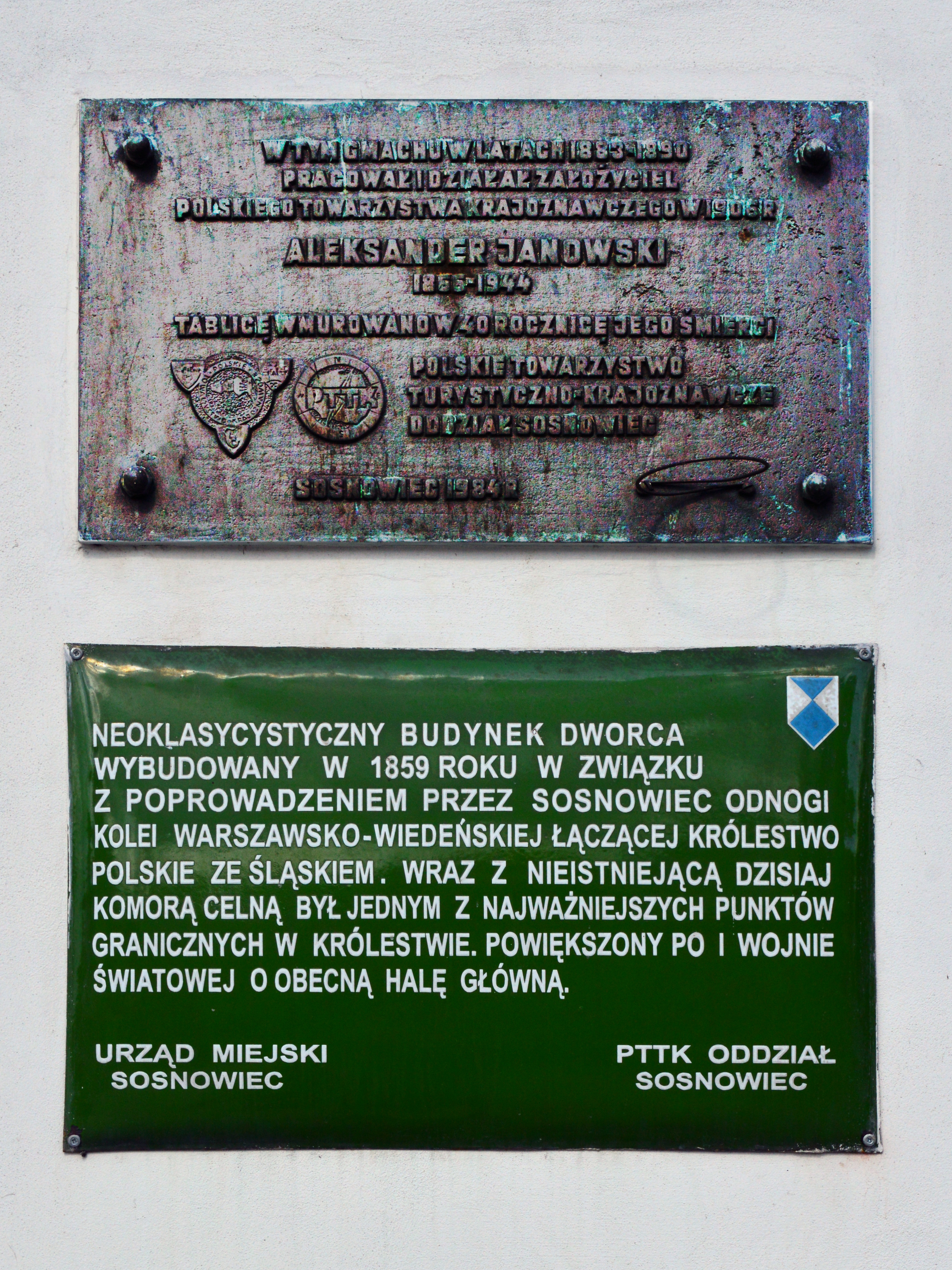

Between 2005 and 2012, the historic station building at Sosnowiec Główny was one of the sites on the Silesian Industrial Monuments Route, which highlights industrial tourism landmarks in the Silesian Voivodeship. Later, it also became one of the venues for the annual Industriada festival.

In July 2014, PKP Polish Railway Lines S.A. announced a tender for platform renovations at the station, which included replacing the surface and platform edges, as well as repairing and repainting the canopy roof and the service building. The work, begun in September 2014, was expected to be completed by the end of November. However, due to delays, PKP terminated the contract with the contractor in January 2015. By then, only a third of Platform 2 had been resurfaced. In March 2015, the company announced a new tender to complete the work. The project, worth 400,000 PLN, was finished in June 2015.

== Infrastructure ==
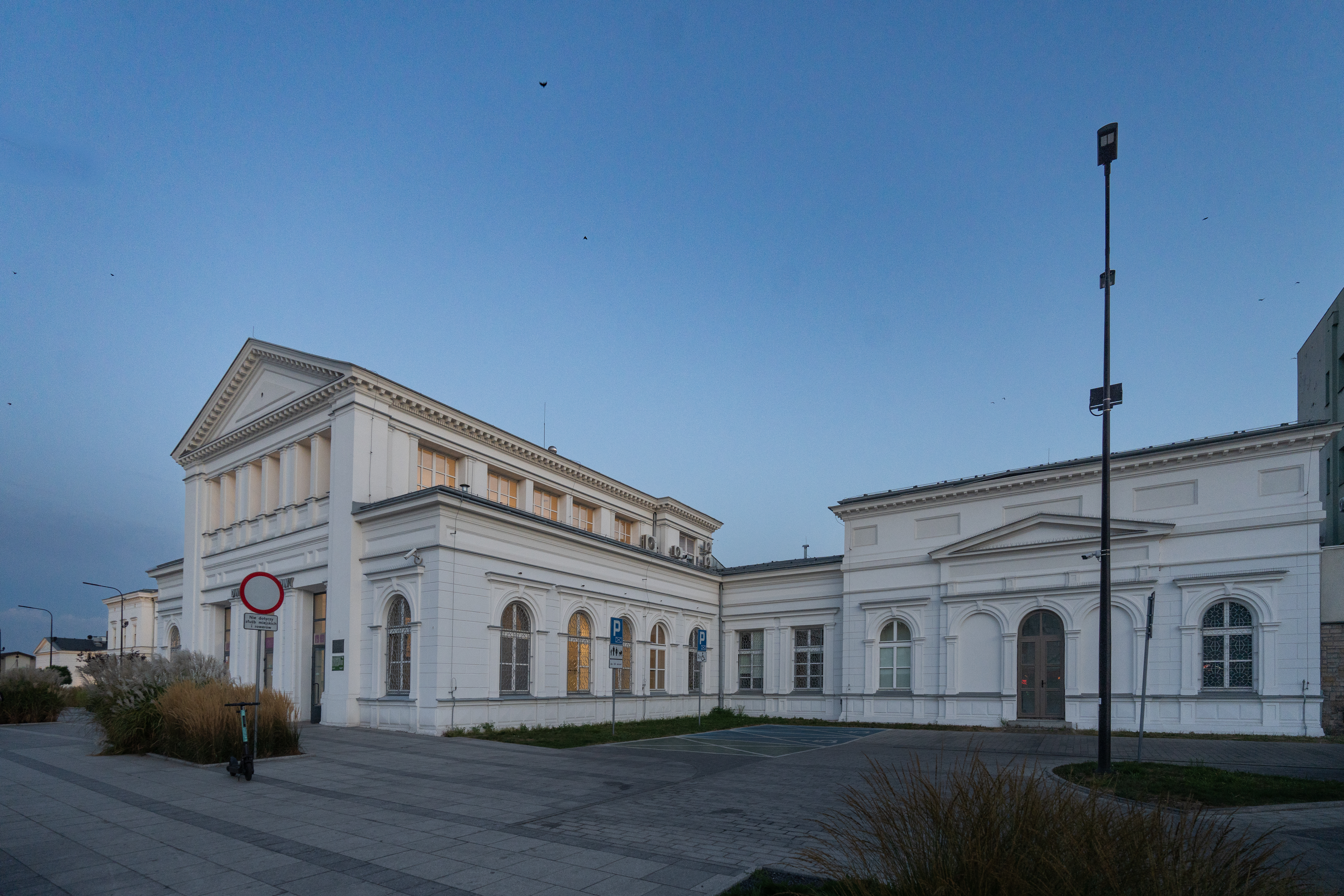
The eastern wing of the station, facing 3 Maja Street

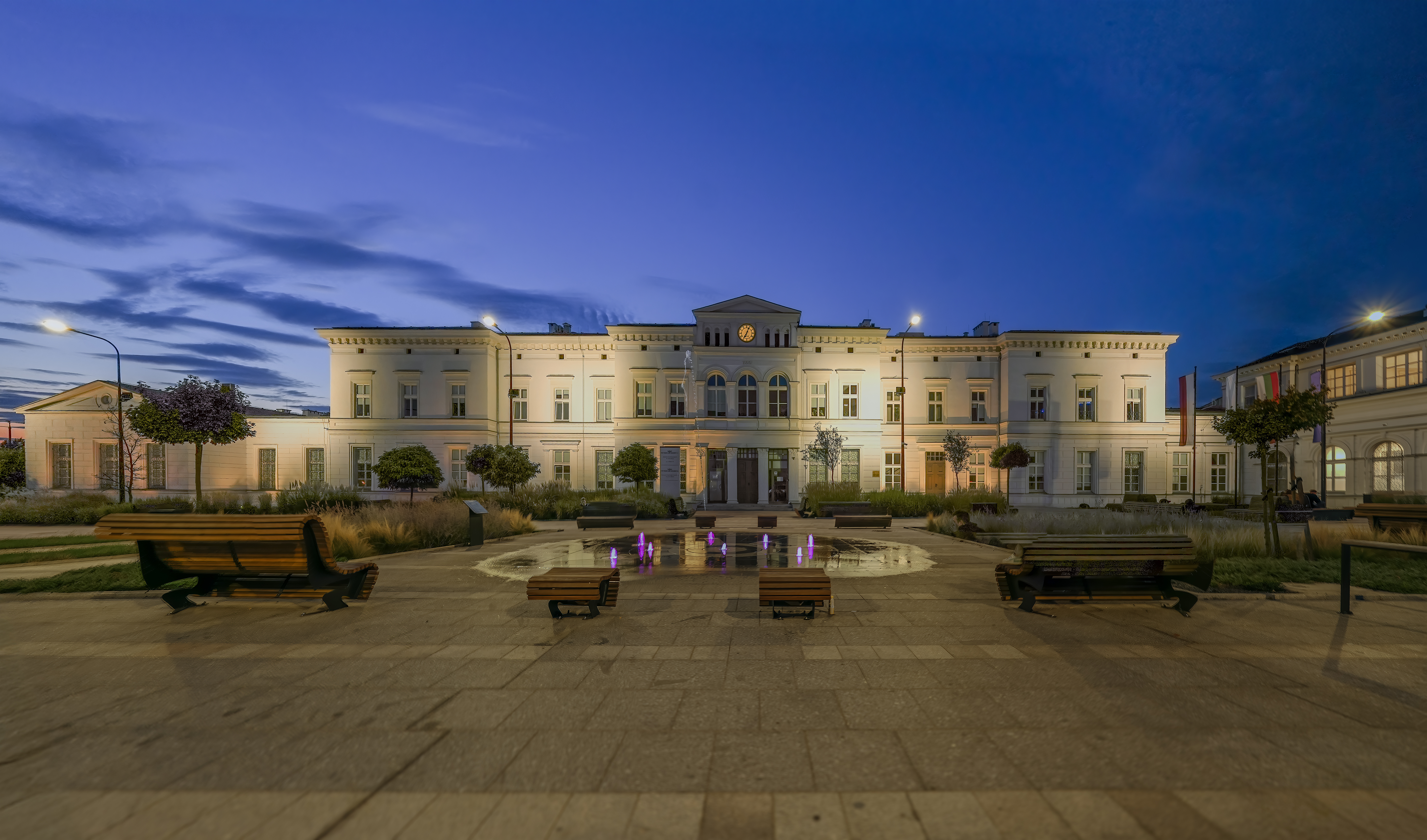
The western wing of the station, with Powstańców Styczniowych Square

=== Railway station building ===
The station building from 1859 is located near Powstańców Styczniowych Square at 16 3 Maja Street in Sosnowiec. The two-story structure was likely designed by the Italian architect Henryk Marconi in the neoclassical style. On September 30, 1999, the building was listed as a historic monument in the Silesian Voivodeship under the number A/15/99. Until 2015, the station served as a library, and from May 2015 it was adapted for use as a tourist office. Eventually, the building became the headquarters of the Railway Line Plant in Sosnowiec - Polish State Railways Polish Railway Lines S.A. Passenger service is conducted in the hall and under the station building. In the underground section of the station, there is a ticket office for Silesian Railways and a paid toilet.

The main station hall is open 24/7. It features three ticket offices operated by PKP Intercity (one of which is adapted for disabled persons), security facilities, and seating benches. The station is equipped with a passenger information system. Access from the waiting room in the upper hall to platforms 1 and 2 is via an underground shopping passage, accessible from the square in front of the building or by elevator.

=== Railway lines ===
Sosnowiec Główny serves as a railway junction. The station is traversed by line 1 and line 62, as well as the international E65 line. List of lines with the station's start, axis, and end kilometer points:.

=== Platforms ===
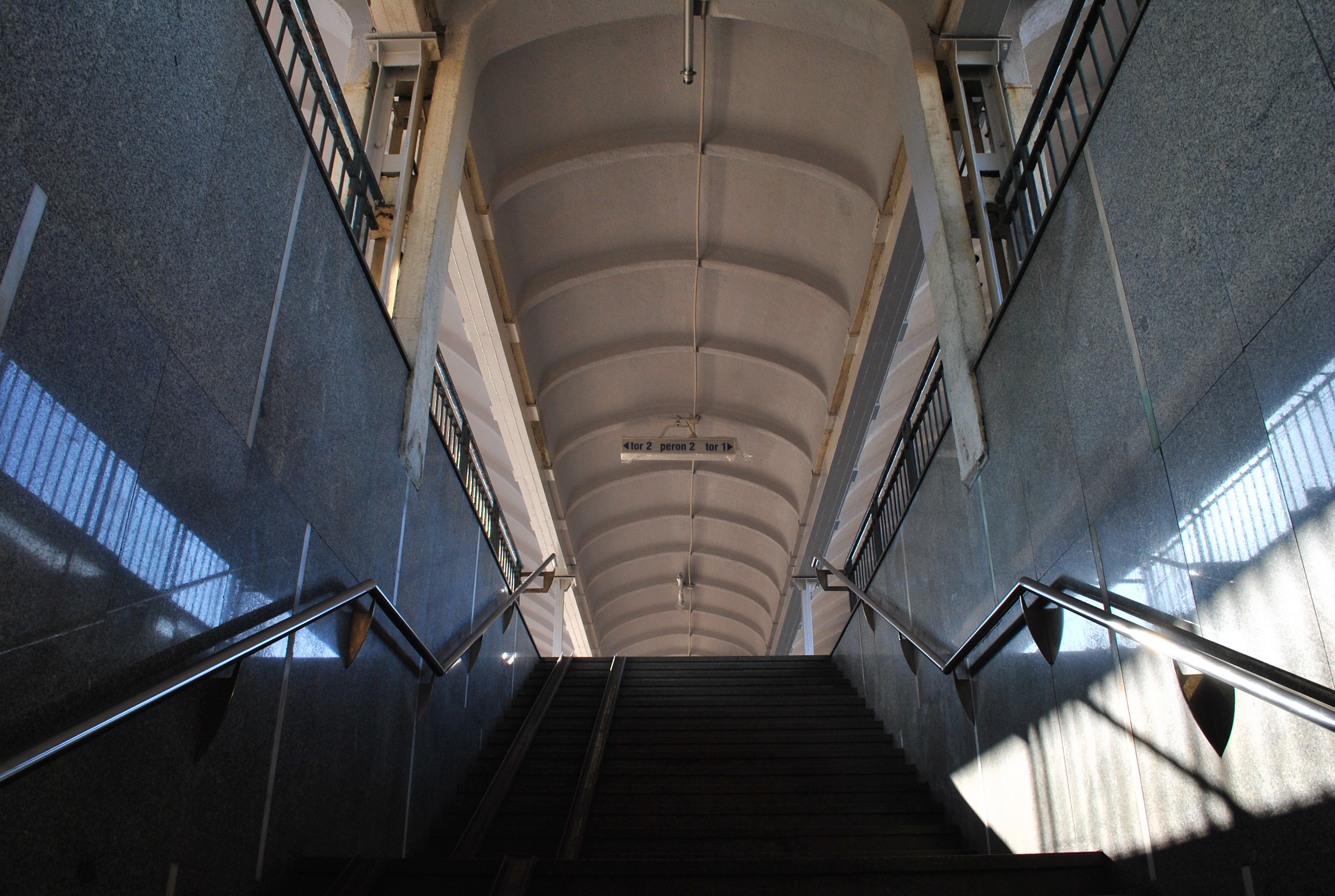
Access to platform 2

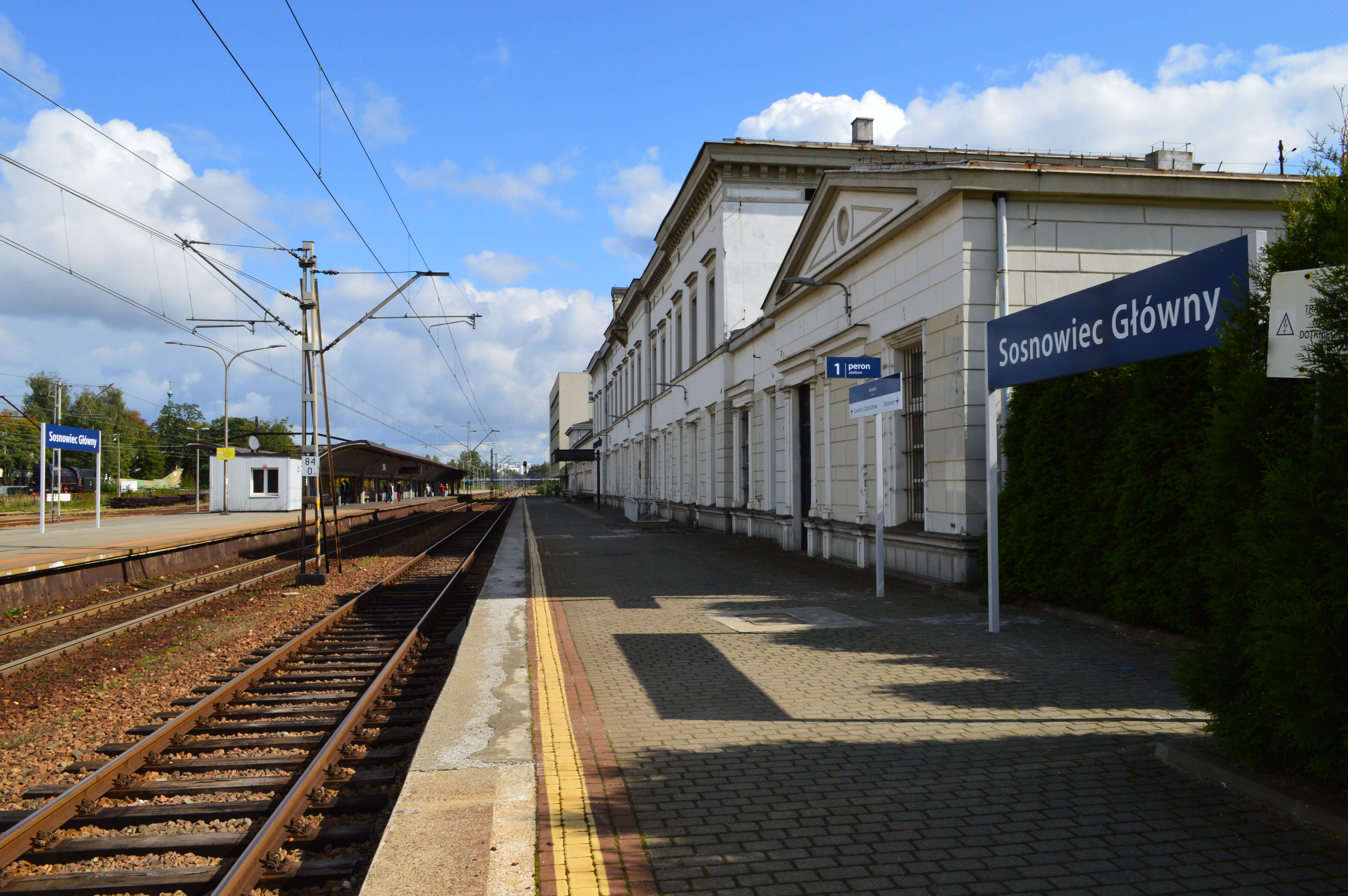
Platforms: 1 on the right, 2 on the left

The station has two platforms. Platform 1 is a low single-edged platform, 232 meters long and 30 cm high. It adjoins track 4 on railway line 62 and has a surface paved with cobblestones. Platform 2 is a high island platform, 394 meters long and 65 cm high. It adjoins tracks 2 and 1 on railway line 1 and has an asphalt surface. This platform is equipped with a roof and benches.

Access to the platforms is via an underground passage beneath the tracks, with entrances from 3 Maja Street or Jana Kilińskiego Street. The platforms feature ramps, sound systems, and electronic display boards.

Between September 2014 and mid-June 2015, the platforms underwent renovation, which included replacing the asphalt surface and platform edges. The platform shelter was refurbished, and new benches, trash bins, and an electronic lift for disabled persons were installed near the stairs.

== Bibliography ==
- Bielecki, Piotr (2009). 150 lat Dworca Kolejowego w Sosnowcu (in Polish). Regionalne Stowarzyszenie Forum dla Zagłębia Dąbrowskiego.
- Biernat, Marcin, ed. (2012). Katalog zabytków techniki przemysłowej Zagłębia Dąbrowskiego (in Polish). Sosnowiec: Zagłębiowska Oficyna Wydawnicza. ISBN 978-83-928381-1-1.
- Liszaj, Tomasz (2011). Zabytkowe dworce w Polsce (in Polish). Bielsko-Biała: Wydawnictwo Dragon. ISBN 978-83-62521-25-8.
- Soida, Krzysztof (1997). Dzieje Katowickiego Okręgu Kolejowego (in Polish) (1 ed.). Katowice: Śląska Dyrekcja Okręgowa Kolei Państwowych. ISBN 83-908518-0-6.
