= Battle of Opatów (1863) =

Coordinates: 50°48′18″N 21°25′29″E

First Battle of Opatów
- Part of January Uprising
Date	November 25, 1863
Location	Opatów, Congress Poland
Result	Polish victory • Russians withdraw from Opatów
Territorial changes	Polish rebels manage to occupy Opatów

Belligerents
Polish National Government	Russian Empire

Units involved
Polish rebels	Imperial Russian Army

Strength
210	180

The First Battle of Opatów, one of many clashes of the January Uprising, took place on November 25, 1863, in the town of Opatów, which at that time belonged to Russian-controlled Congress Poland. A party of 210 Polish rebels, commanded by Józef Hauke-Bosak, managed to temporarily capture the town, which was defended by a 180-strong garrison of the Imperial Russian Army.

Polish rebels took advantage of the fact that main Russian forces had left Opatów, to chase rebel units operating near the town of Ilza. Hauke-Bossak ordered an attack from three sides. Weak Russian garrison was unable to defend the town, and was pushed out of Opatów. Poles captured the town and withdrew with seized Russian guns and ammunition towards Suchedniów.

== Sources ==
- Stefan Kieniewicz: Powstanie styczniowe. Warszawa: Państwowe Wydawnictwo Naukowe, 1983. ISBN 83-01-03652-4.
