= Battle of Opatów (1864) =

Coordinates: 50°48′18″N 21°25′29″E

The Second Battle of Opatów, one of many clashes of the January Uprising, took place on 21 February 1864 near the town of Opatów, which at that time belonged to Russian-controlled Congress Poland. A party of some 1,000 Polish insurgents, commanded by Ludwik Zwierzdowski and Apolinary Kurowski, tried to capture the town, which was defended by an 800-strong garrison of the Imperial Russian Army. The battle ended in Russian victory; Russian losses were estimated at app. 50 killed, while Poles lost 50 killed and 62 wounded.

In February 1864, Russian general Ksawery Czengiery concentrated some 4,500 soldiers in the area of Sandomierz, Opatów, Stopnica and Staszow. Polish insurgents in the region had app. 1,000 armed men. Since Polish general Józef Hauke-Bosak was in other location, these forces were commanded by Apolinary Kurowski and Ludwik Topór-Zwierzdowski. Both decided to attack the Russians in their weakest point, and then capture Opatów. They underestimated Russian forces, which defended the town.

Polish attack on Opatów began in the evening of 21 February. The rebels managed to seize 75% of the town, including Russian barracks with a number of rifles kept there. Due to desperate Russian resistance, their advance was checked after several hours. At midnight, Kurowski ordered his men to leave the town, as he feared Russian reinforcements, marching from Sandomierz. On the next day, Russians captured Ludwik Zwierzdowski, and hanged him at Opatów's market square on 23 February.

== Sources ==
- Stefan Kieniewicz: Powstanie styczniowe. Warszawa: Państwowe Wydawnictwo Naukowe, 1983. ISBN 83-01-03652-4.
