= Będzin Miasto railway station =

Railway station in Będzin, Poland

Będzin Miasto Będzin Miasto
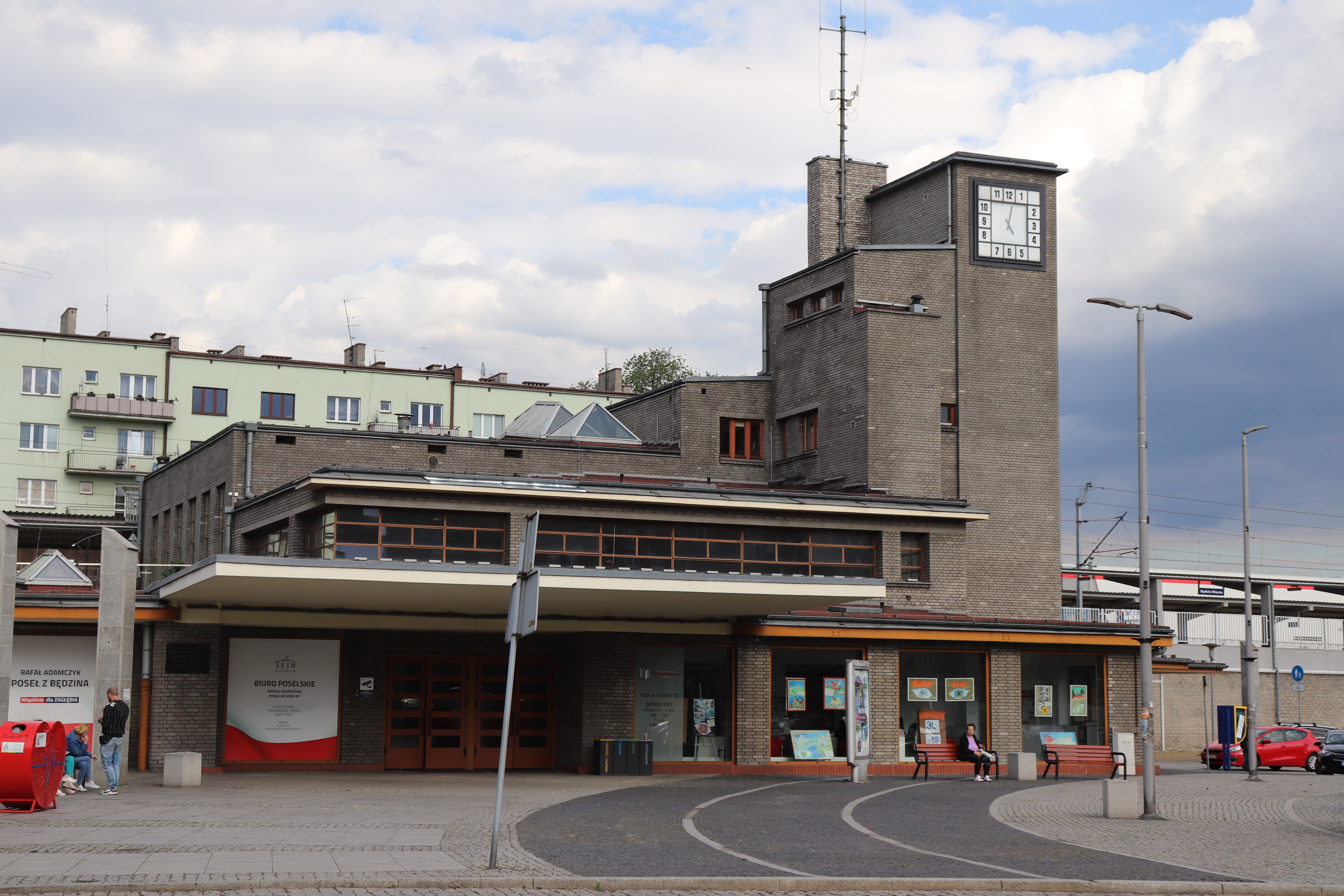
- The Będzin Miasto train station

General information
- Other names: Stary Będzin (1859-1914); Bedzin Stadt (1914-1919); Staro-Będzin (1918-1924); Będzin Miasto (1924-1939); Bendzin Stadt (1939-1941); Bendsburg Stadt (1941-1945)
- Location: Poland
- Coordinates: 50.32000°N 19.13556°E
- Operator: PKP PLK
- Line: Line 1 Warsaw West – Katowice
- Platforms: 2
- Tracks: 2
- Train operators: Silesian Railways; PKP InterCity

History
- Opened: 1859
Location

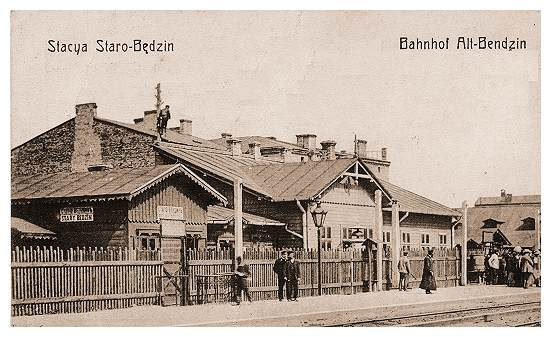
The Będzin Miasto station during World War I

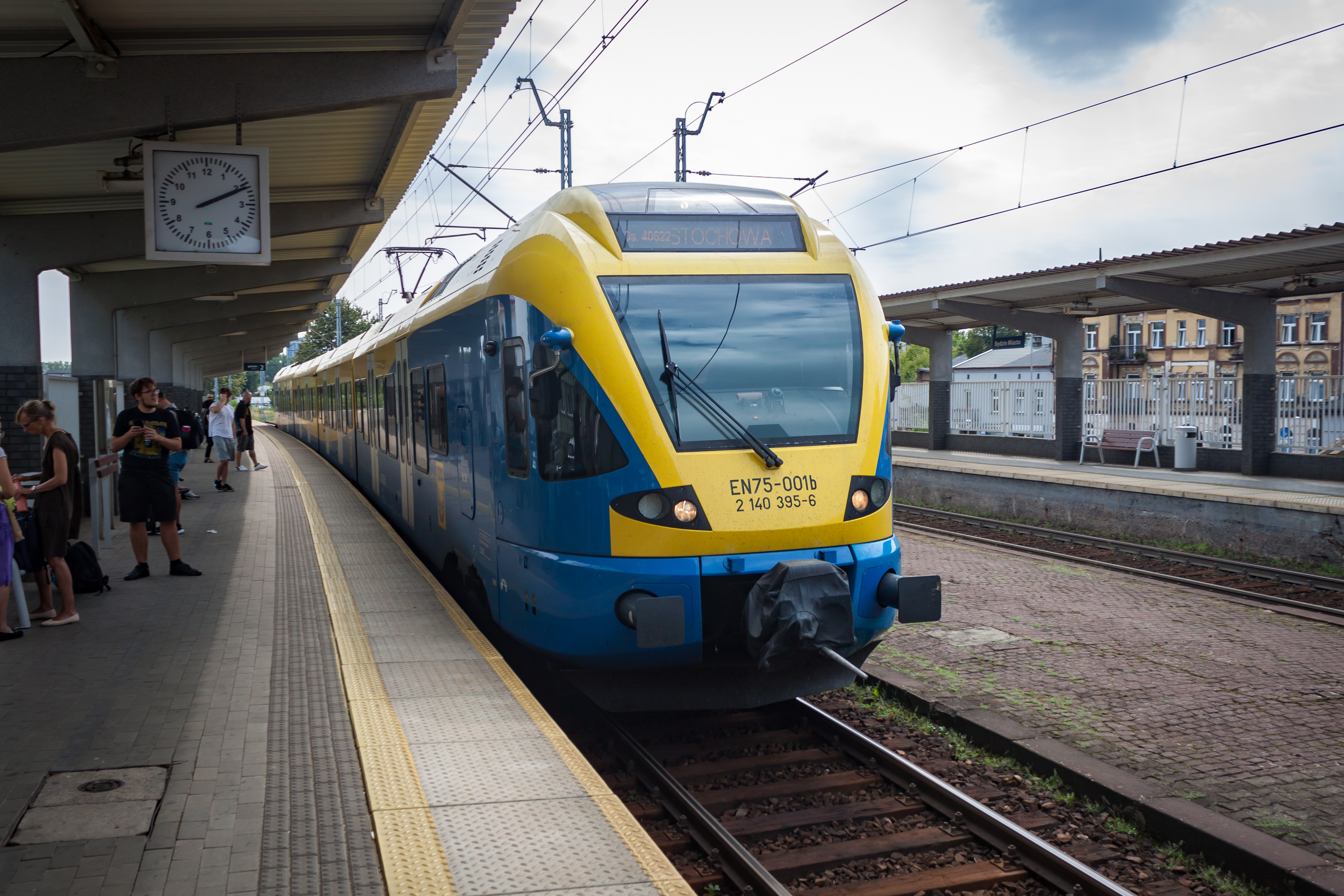
The platform of the station

Będzin Miasto is a railway stop in Będzin, Silesian Voivodeship, Poland. The station primarily serves local connections within the Upper Silesian metropolitan area and the voivodeship. It also handles several interregional connections to cities in other Polish voivodeships, such as Białystok, Gdynia, Lublin, Olsztyn, and Warsaw. Trains operated by Silesian Railways, Polregio, PKP Intercity: Twoje Linie Kolejowe (TLK), and InterCity stop at this station.

== Station building ==
The original station building, constructed around 1859, quickly became inadequate for the needs of the city due to its partly wooden construction and small size. A modern station in the modernist style was designed on an area of 4,800 m² in 1927 by the renowned architect Edgar Aleksander Norwerth, with Stanisław Hempel as the structural engineer. The station building, constructed by the company Pronaszko i Sobieszek, was opened in the spring of 1931, two years behind schedule. Although the design for the station was ready in 1927, a lack of funds and difficulties associated with purchasing private land meant that the building was not opened until 1931.

For many years, the modernist station building was one of the most representative landmarks of the city. However, later it fell into disrepair. Before 2006, the station was in very poor condition due to many years of neglect and lack of repairs. In the summer of 2006, renovation work began. In the first stage, the roof was repaired, the top of the chimney on the tower was dismantled and rebuilt, and windows and doors were replaced. In the second stage, the installations were replaced. The final stage (2010-2012) included the installation of an elevator, opening the building onto the Warsaw-Vienna Railway Square by enlarging window openings in the west wall, and adapting the ground floor space for rental premises.

== Passenger traffic ==
Year	Daily passenger exchange
2017	700-199
2022	1,100

== Infrastructure ==
The station has two covered platforms with facilities for people with disabilities, each with one platform edge. The platforms are connected to the station building by an underpass. The station building includes a waiting room, a ticket office, a Silesian Railways ticket vending machine, toilets, and retail and service premises. After the renovation (2006-2012), the "Będzin Miasto" station building became home to the city guard headquarters, a library branch, a cafe, and a ticket office.

== Connections ==
In front of the main entrance to the station building, there is a Metrorower city bike system station number 27796 and bicycle racks. There is also a taxi rank and a bus stop, Będzin Poczta (30m) near the main entrance and Będzin Brata Alberta (200m) on the east side of the station. One of the city's most important transport hubs, Będzin Stadion, which offers bus and tram connections to other cities in the Metropolis, is located 900m away.
