= Battle of Sosnowiec =

Battle in the January Uprising

- Part of the January Uprising
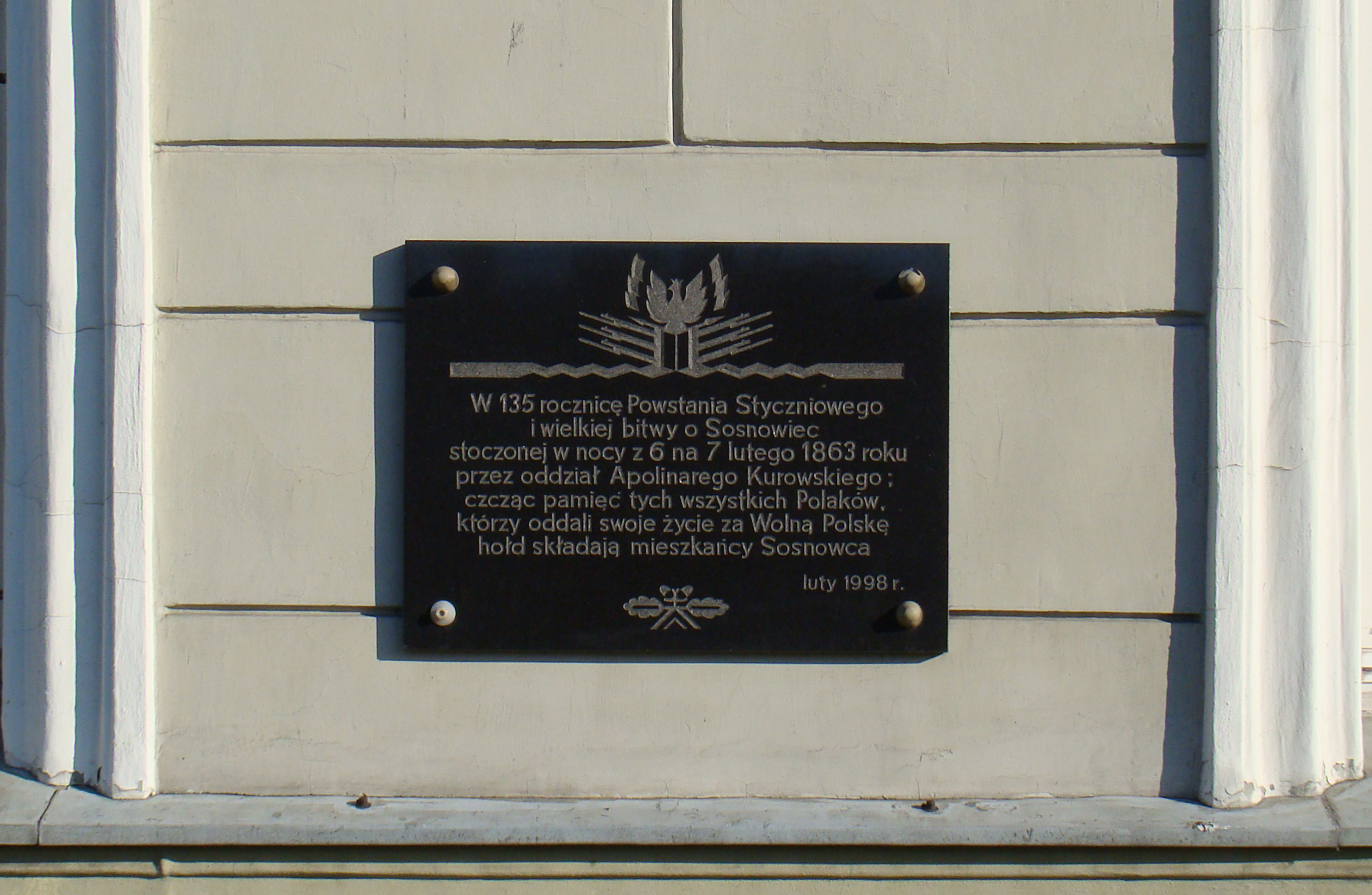
- Memorial plaque at the main train station in Sosnowiec
Date	6–7 February 1863
Location	Sosnowiec 50°17′N 19°08′E
Result	Polish victory

Belligerents
(Poland) Polish insurgents	Russian Empire

Commanders and leaders
Apolinary Kurowski	

Strength
150–250	300

Casualties and losses
3 dead and 17 wounded	Sizeable, incl. 30 POWs
- Location within Poland

The Battle of Sosnowiec was one of battles of the January Uprising. It took place in the night of 6–7 February 1863, between Polish insurgents under Colonel Apolinary Kurowski, and the Imperial Russian Army garrison stationed in the town of Sosnowiec, in the Russian-ruled territory known officially as the ‘Kingdom of Poland’, otherwise Congress Poland.

On 5 February 1863 Kurowski and his men left Ojców, and marched towards Olkusz. He had some 150 men, who were joined by additional 100, including cavalry, riflemen and kosynierzy. The unit spent the night at Olkusz, and in the morning of 6 February they marched westwards, to Sławków and then Maczki (now a district of Sosnowiec). At that time Maczki was a very important railroad station, located at the border of the Russian Empire and the Kingdom of Prussia.

The insurgents captured a train with the assistance of rail workers and coal miners from the Zagłębie Dąbrowskie region, and at 9 p.m. left Maczki, heading to Sosnowiec via Dąbrowa Górnicza. At 2 a.m. on 7 February, insurgent infantry left the train near Sielec, marching to the Sosnowiec Main Station. Then they attacked Russian garrison, which manned the station and nearby custom house. After some time, the Russians fled either to Modrzejów, or towards the nearby Prussian border. The Poles then released 30 captured prisoners of war, but several joined the insurgents.

The insurgents seized 40 horses, weapons, and 97,000 roubles, sharing the money with Polish National Government. For the next two weeks, Poles controlled Sosnowiec and other areas of Zagłębie Dąbrowskie, with Polish banners hanging from administration buildings.

== Sources ==
- Stefan Kieniewicz: Powstanie styczniowe. Warszawa: Polish Scientific Publishers PWN, 1983. ISBN 83-01-03652-4.
