= Katowice railway station =

Railway station in Katowice, Poland

Coordinates: 50°15′30″N 19°01′03″E

Katowice
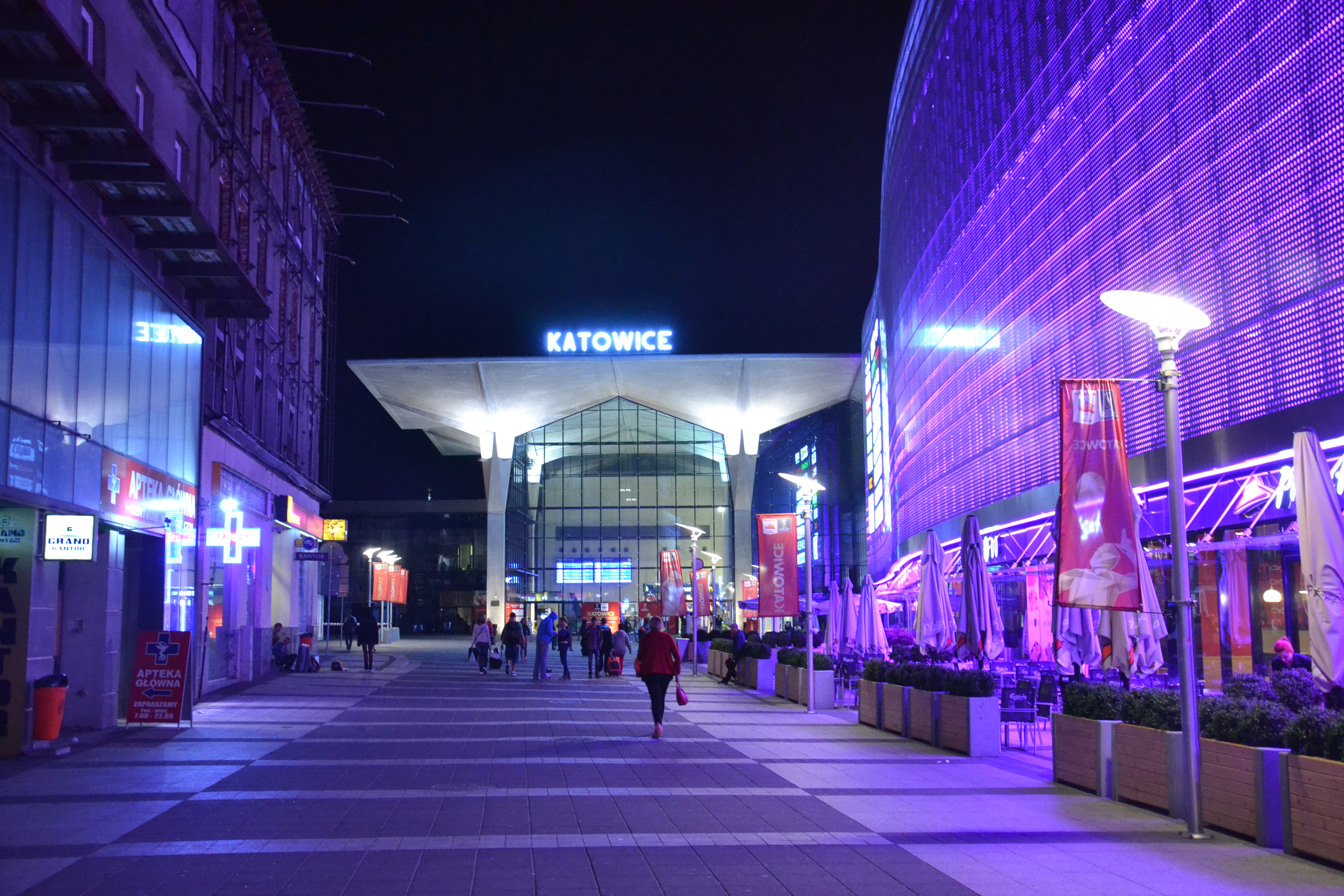

General information
- Location: 40-098 Katowice, Plac Marii i Lecha Kaczyńskich 2, city centre, Katowice, Silesian Voivodeship; Poland
- System: A
- Owner: PKP Polskie Linie Kolejowe
- Platforms: 8+2

History
- Opened: 1972
Location
- Location within Poland Location within Silesian Voivodeship

Katowice railway station is a railway station in Katowice, Silesia, Poland, and the largest railway station in the Upper Silesian Industrial Region. Domestic and international trains connect at the station to most major cities in Europe; these are operated primarily by Polskie Koleje Państwowe.

During 1972, Katowice railway station was officially completed, having been built as a replacement station for the city's old terminus, Katowice historic train station. It is located in the centre of Katowice city, and forms one of the biggest transport interchanges anywhere in Poland. As built, the railway station was located only a few minutes walk away from the city's main bus station. By the twenty-first century, Katowice railway station was reportedly being used by around 12 million passengers per year. The condition of the building had degraded over the course of 30 years, creating to an impetus for its replacement.

During July 2009, it was announced that the Polish government had signed an agreement with the Spanish construction firm Neinver for the latter to build a new integrated transportation hub and commercial center in the middle of Katowice, including the redevelopment of the existing railway station. During May 2010, ground was broken at the site, marking the official commencement of phase one of construction, which was focused on the main station building itself; a temporary building was used to host train services while the original hall was demolished and its replacement built. During phase two of the redevelopment programme, the station's platforms were progressively closed for reconstruction. Later phases of the work involved the construction of the retail, hotel, and other on-site facilities. By late 2012, the new main hall of the railway station and its integrated underground bus station had become operational; during the summer of 2013, the entire complex, including the adjoining Galeria Katowicka mall on Szewczyk Square, was officially completed.

== History ==
=== 1970s incarnation ===
During the 1960s, work began on the construction of a replacement station for the city's old terminus, Katowice historic train station, which dated back to the nineteenth century. The new complex was designed to serve as a high-profile example of modern architecture; the main railway hall of the building was designed as a collaborative effort between the Polish architects Wacław Kłyszewski, Jerzy Mokrzyński and Eugeniusz Wierzbicki, while the construction of the station was supervised by the noted civil engineer and designer Wacław Zalewski. Beyond its aesthetic qualities, the hall's design took into account the troublesome ground conditions present at the site, as the region has been previously used for coal mining and is known to remain susceptible to tectonic movement to the present day.

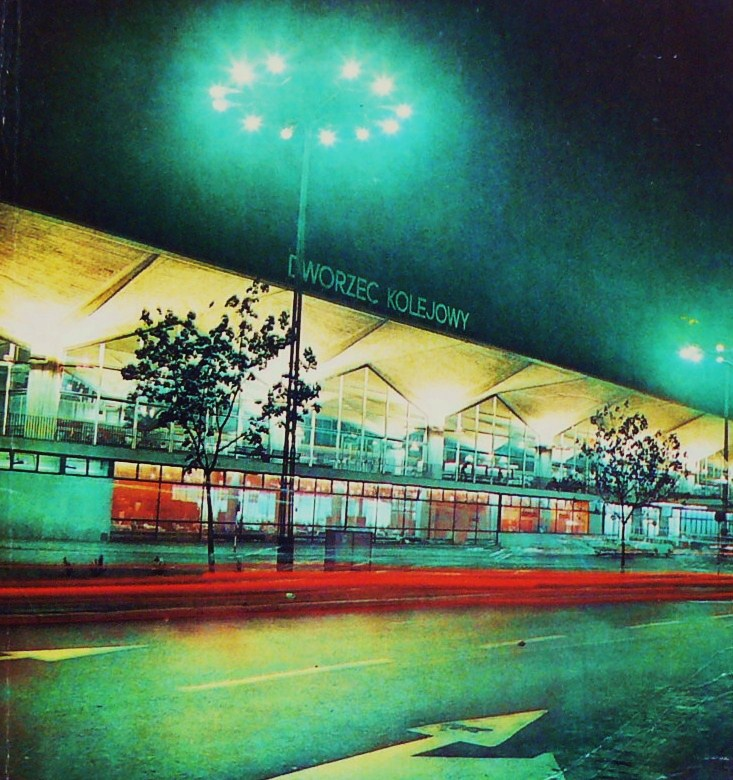
Station in 1973

During 1972, Katowice railway station was officially completed and passenger services commenced that year. It is located in the centre of Katowice city, and forms of the biggest transport interchanges anywhere in Poland. Since opening, the station has accommodated connecting services through to various major cities across Poland, as well as to many international destinations across Europe. Around the start of the twenty-first century, it is believed that, on average, around 520 trains per day were stopping at Katowice Railway Station, while the facility was also being used by roughly 12 million passengers annually.

Through the station, Katowice is connected to major cities including Vienna, Budapest, Kiev, Berlin, Ostrava, Prague, Bratislava, Zilina, Hamburg, Moscow and Minsk. The railway station is located only a few minutes walk away from the city's main bus station; this closeness serves to ease passenger movements between the two transit networks.

However, by the twenty-first century, the condition of Katowice railway station was visibly deteriorating in places. Specifically, inspections of the building's cup-shaped pillar structures discovered that many has fallen into a poor condition and that correcting this weakness required considerable remedial action to guarantee long-term structural integrity, or would necessitate the building's demolition. Following an analysis of the possible options, it was determined that the facility's wholesale replacement via the site's redevelopment was the preferred option. During June 2009, PKP SA (Polish State Railways SA) unveiled its plans for the modernisation and commercialisation of various railway stations across the country in the near-future, including Katowice railway station. During this announcement, it was revealed that considerable planning activity had already been conducted on the initiative, including the scheduling of investments and securing of finance, as well as detailed modernisation plans, in conjunction with the public revealing of the strategy.

=== 2010s redevelopment ===
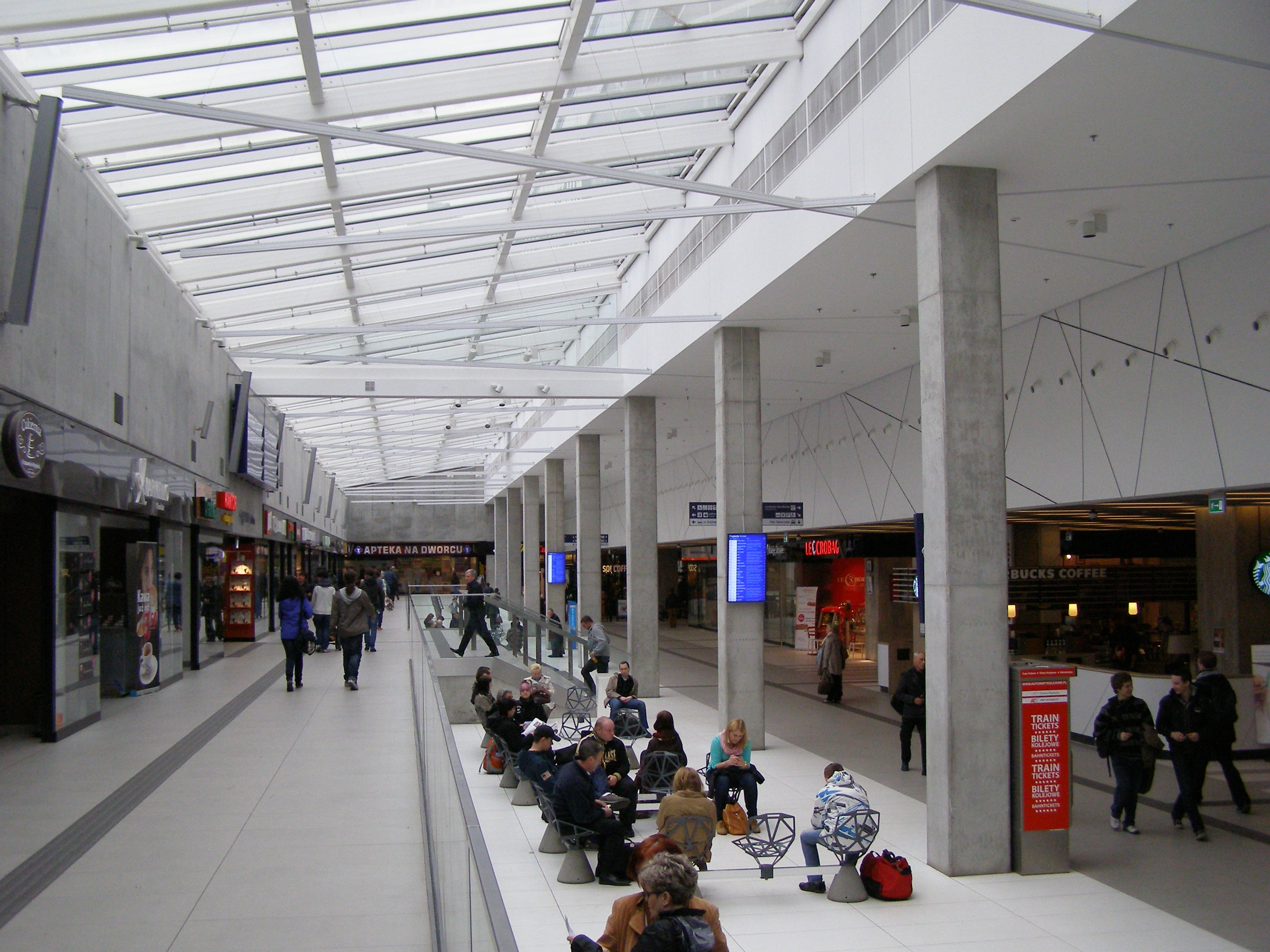
Interior of the redeveloped railway station, 2013

During July 2009, it was announced that the Polish government had signed a construction agreement with the Spanish construction firm Neinver, under which the latter would perform the construction of a new integrated transportation hub and commercial center in the middle of Katowice. This programme involved the reconstruction of the existing railway station, along with the construction of an underground bus station, an adjacent shopping center (Galeria Katowicka) and an office tower; other changes included the reconfiguring of various streets, sidewalks and public space located around the railway station. The underground part of the complex will feature new multi-storey car parking facilities. Reportedly, the overall investment was estimated in 2009 to come to around 240 million euros.

As planned, the redeveloped railway station is not to be entirely newly built; instead, it is intended to retain several existing elements of the building, albeit renovated and modernised where deemed to be suitable or necessary. The problematic cup-shaped pillars are one such element, being reinforced rather than removed; a grand new entrance into the main hall of the station is to be developed between the two cups. A glazed structure which connects between the railway station and the new retail and office facilities shall be constructed; the shopping and office complex are to be located upon a newly built elevation, composed primarily of perforated steel structures, these are reportedly intended to provide an aesthetically pleasing lighting effect via their highly reflective characteristics. will make the building resemble a lighted city centre at night. The existing terrace, leading to a footbridge over the square on Szewczyk Fashion Avenue, is to be demolished.

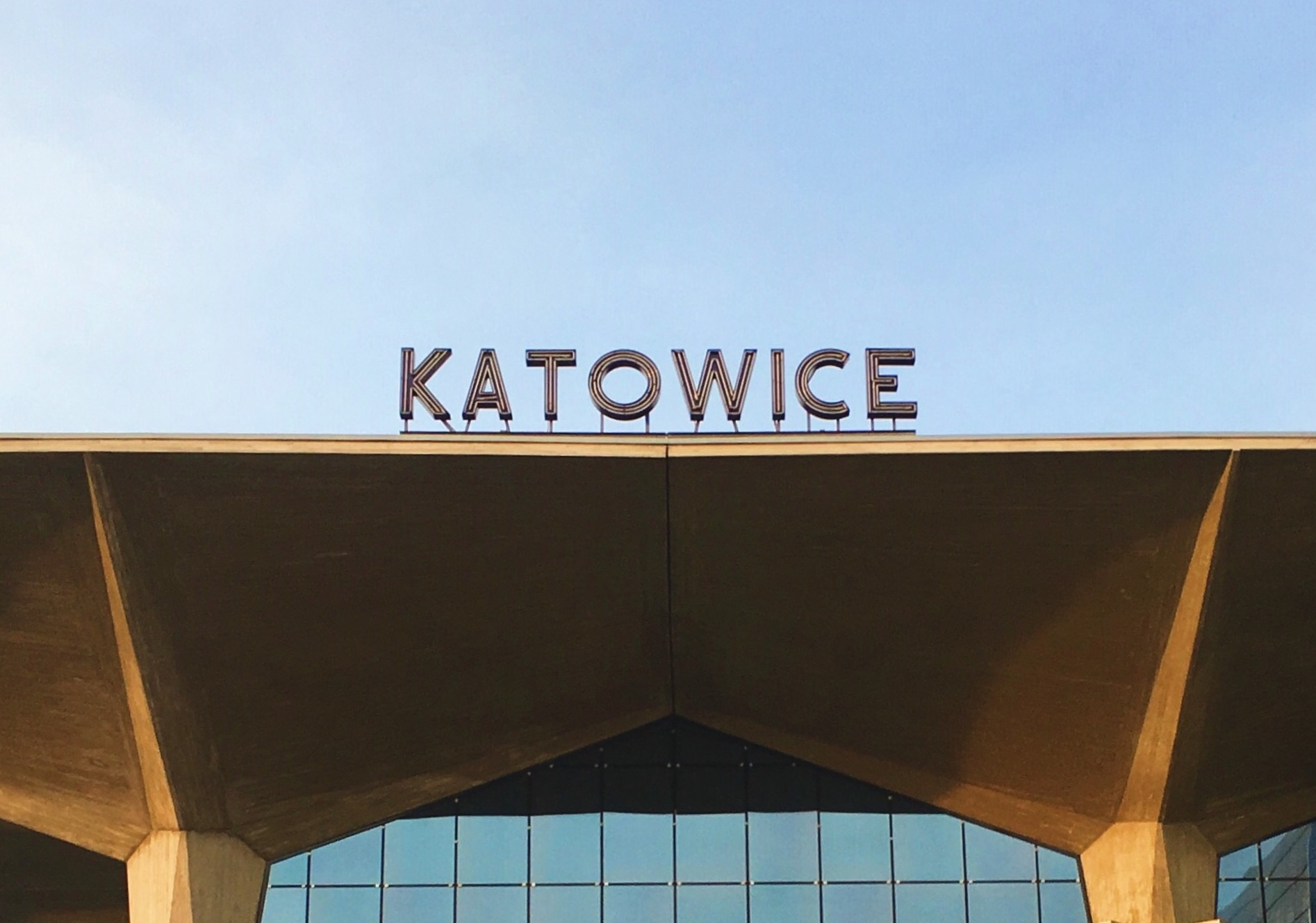
Neon sign of the station

During May 2010, ground was broken at the site, marking the official commencement of the construction phase of the new project. By the end of September 2010, a temporary train station had been opened to accommodate the diversion of passenger services; the old station concourse was closed on 1 October 2010. The first phase of construction was focused on the main station building itself, which is features a one-story hall featuring multiple ticketing counters and information desks, along with 31 retail outlets and trade points, a spacious waiting area for passengers, and compressive closed-circuit television coverage across the complex. As designed, it is to be suited for being simultaneously used by up to 5,000 passengers at any one time, and serve an estimated 12 million visitors per year. The demolition of the old main hall was performed between 22 December 2010 and 11 January 2011. The main station hall was originally scheduled for completion by May 2012; however, the new one-level station hall was eventually opened during October 2012, several months behind schedule.

During the ensuring months, a number of the station's platforms were shut off and services redirected so that work could be performed on them, which was undertaken as series of staggered platform reconstructions, performed during phase two of the redevelopment programme. The entire complex, including the adjoining Galeria Katowicka mall on Szewczyk Square, was completed by the summer of 2013, with the new main hall and its integrated (underground) bus station having entered operation by late 2012. The main hall is connected through to the platforms through a series of fixed and removable ramps. The redevelopment programme entailed a total development area of around 136,000 m^{2}, of which 17,350 m^{2} of the gross building area (GBA) was the railway station itself, while 8,100 m^{2} GBA was used for offices and 4,800 m^{2} for an on-site hotel. During March 2018, the newly built mall was sold to Malaysian investment fund Kwasa Europe.

== Train services ==
The station is served by the following service(s):

- EuroCity services (EC) (EC 95 by DB) (IC by PKP) Berlin - Frankfurt (Oder) - Rzepin - Wrocław – Katowice – Kraków – Rzeszów – Przemyśl
- Express Intercity Premium services (EIP) Warsaw - Katowice - Bielsko-Biała
- Express Intercity Premium services (EIP) Gdynia - Warsaw - Katowice - Gliwice/Bielsko-Biała
- Intercity services (IC) Kraków Główny — Świnoujście
- Intercity services (IC) Warszawa - Częstochowa - Katowice - Bielsko-Biała
- Intercity services (IC) Białystok - Warszawa - Częstochowa - Katowice - Bielsko-Biała
- Intercity services (IC) Szczecin - Białogard - Szczecinek - Piła - Poznań - Ostrów Wielkopolski - Katowice - Zakopane
- Intercity services (IC) Olsztyn - Warszawa - Skierniewice - Częstochowa - Katowice - Bielsko-Biała
- Intercity services (IC) Olsztyn - Warszawa - Skierniewice - Częstochowa - Katowice - Gliwice - Racibórz
- Intercity services (TLK) Warszawa - Częstochowa - Katowice - Opole - Wrocław - Szklarska Poręba Górna
- Intercity services (TLK) Katowice - Częstochowa - Piotrków Trybunalski - Łódź - Płock
- Regional services along PKP rail line 133 Dąbrowa Górnicza Ząbkowice - Kraków Główny
  - Regional services (R) Katowice — Kraków
  - Regional services (R) Katowice — Kraków — Dębica
- Regional services along Linia Hutnicza Szerokotorowa
  - Regional services (R) Katowice — Kozłów
  - Regional services (R) Katowice — Kozłów — Sędziszów
  - Regional services (R) Katowice — Kozłów — Sędziszów — Kielce
  - Regional services (R) Katowice — Kozłów — Sędziszów — Kielce — Busko-Zdrój

Preceding station	PKP Intercity	Following station
Zabrze towards Berlin Hbf	EuroCity EC 95; IC	Kraków Główny towards Przemyśl Główny
Sosnowiec Główny towards Gdynia Główna	EIP	Zabrze towards Gliwice
Sosnowiec Główny towards Gdynia Główna	EIP	Tychy towards Bielsko-Biała Główna
Sosnowiec Główny towards Warszawa Wschodnia	EIP	Tychy towards Bielsko-Biała Główna
Sosnowiec Główny towards Warszawa Wschodnia or Białystok	IC	Tychy towards Bielsko-Biała Główna
Zabrze towards Szczecin Główny	IC	Kalwaria Zebrzydowska Lanckorona towards Zakopane
Tychy towards Bielsko-Biała Główna	IC	Sosnowiec Główny towards Olsztyn Główny
Chorzów-Batory towards Racibórz	IC	Sosnowiec Główny towards Olsztyn Główny
Chorzów-Batory towards Szklarska Poręba Górna	TLK via Katowice	Zawiercie towards Warszawa Wschodnia or Płock
Preceding station	Polregio	Following station
Terminus	PR	Katowice Zawodzie towards Kraków Główny or Dębica
Terminus	PR	Katowice Zawodzie towards Kozłów, Sędziszów, Kielce or Busko-Zdrój
Preceding station	KŚ	Following station
Katowice Załęże towards Gliwice	S1	Katowice Zawodzie towards Częstochowa
Terminus	S3	Katowice Zawodzie towards Kraków Płaszów
Terminus	S31	Katowice Zawodzie towards Oświęcim (Auschwitz)
Katowice Brynów towards Tychy Lodowisko	S4	Terminus
Katowice Brynów towards Tychy Lodowisko	S41	Katowice Zawodzie towards Częstochowa
Terminus	S5	Katowice Brynów towards Zwardoń
Terminus	S51	Katowice Brynów towards Zakopane
Terminus	S6	Katowice Ligota towards Wisła Głębce
Terminus	S7	Katowice Brynów towards Racibórz
Terminus	S71	Katowice Brynów towards Chałupki
Chorzów Miasto towards Lubliniec	S8	Terminus

== See also ==
- Rail transport in Poland
- List of busiest railway stations in Poland
