= Katowice historic railway station =

Coordinates: 50°15′26″N 19°01′25″E

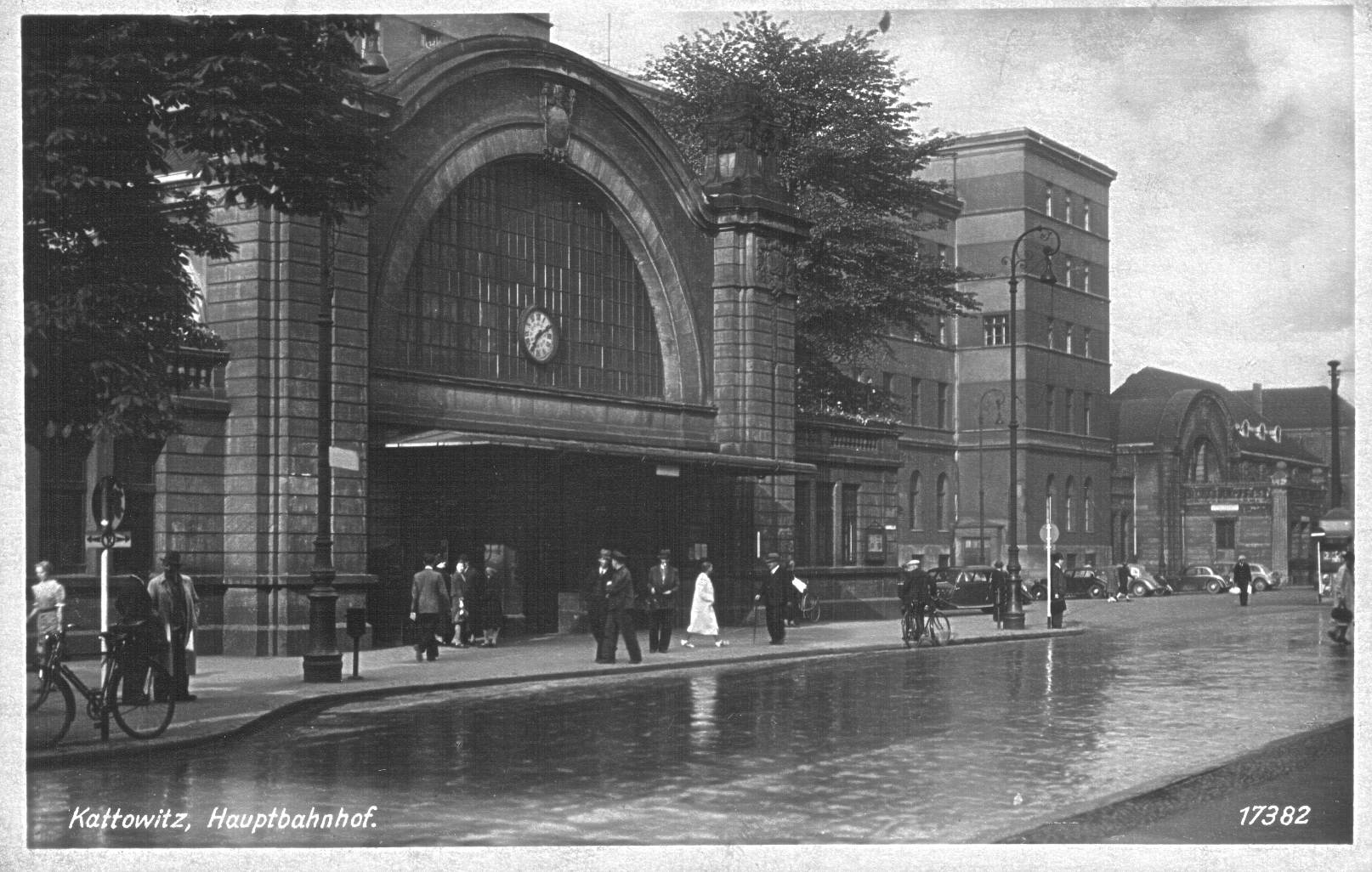
Old postcard of Katowice railway station

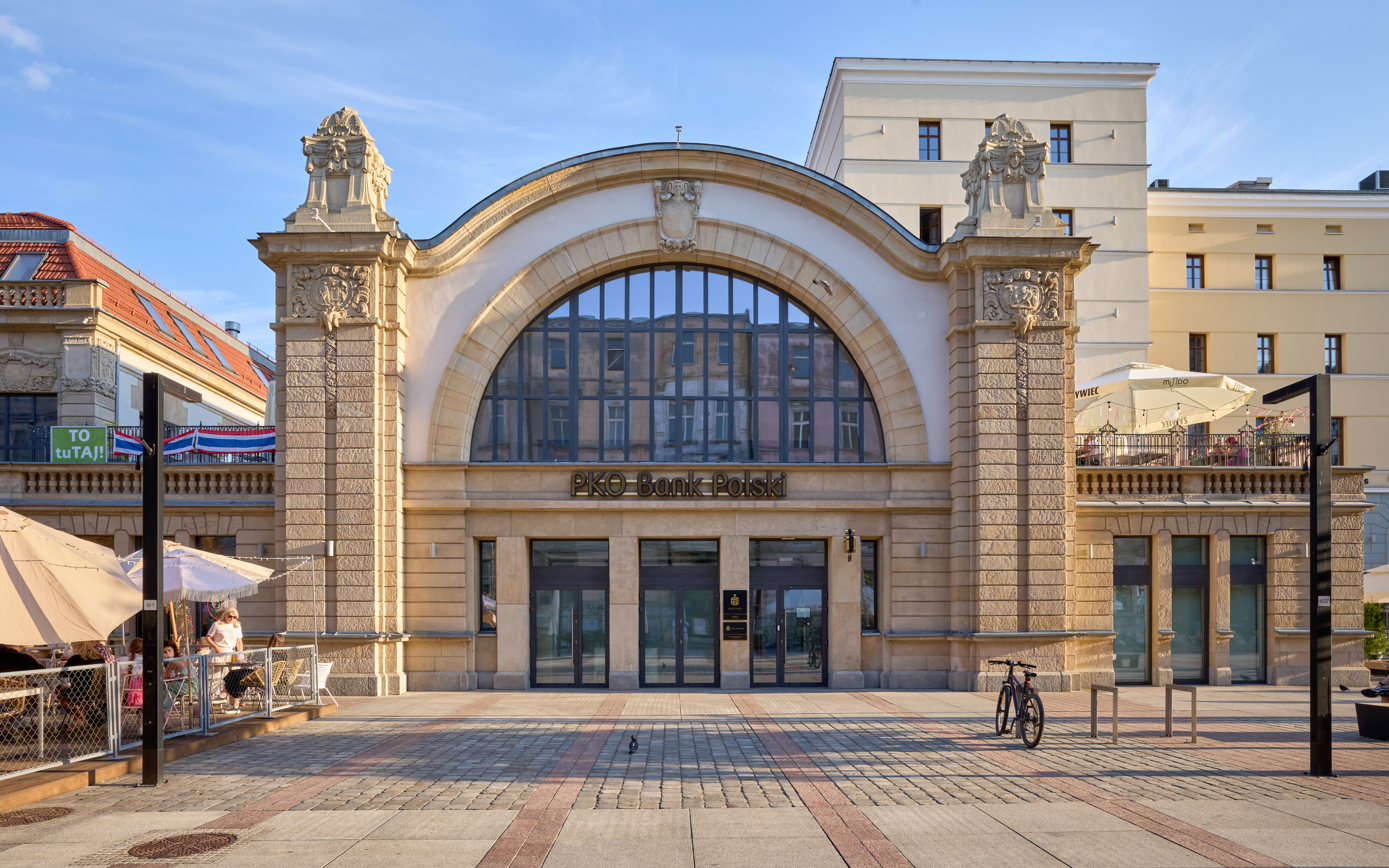
Old railway station in Katowice, 2024

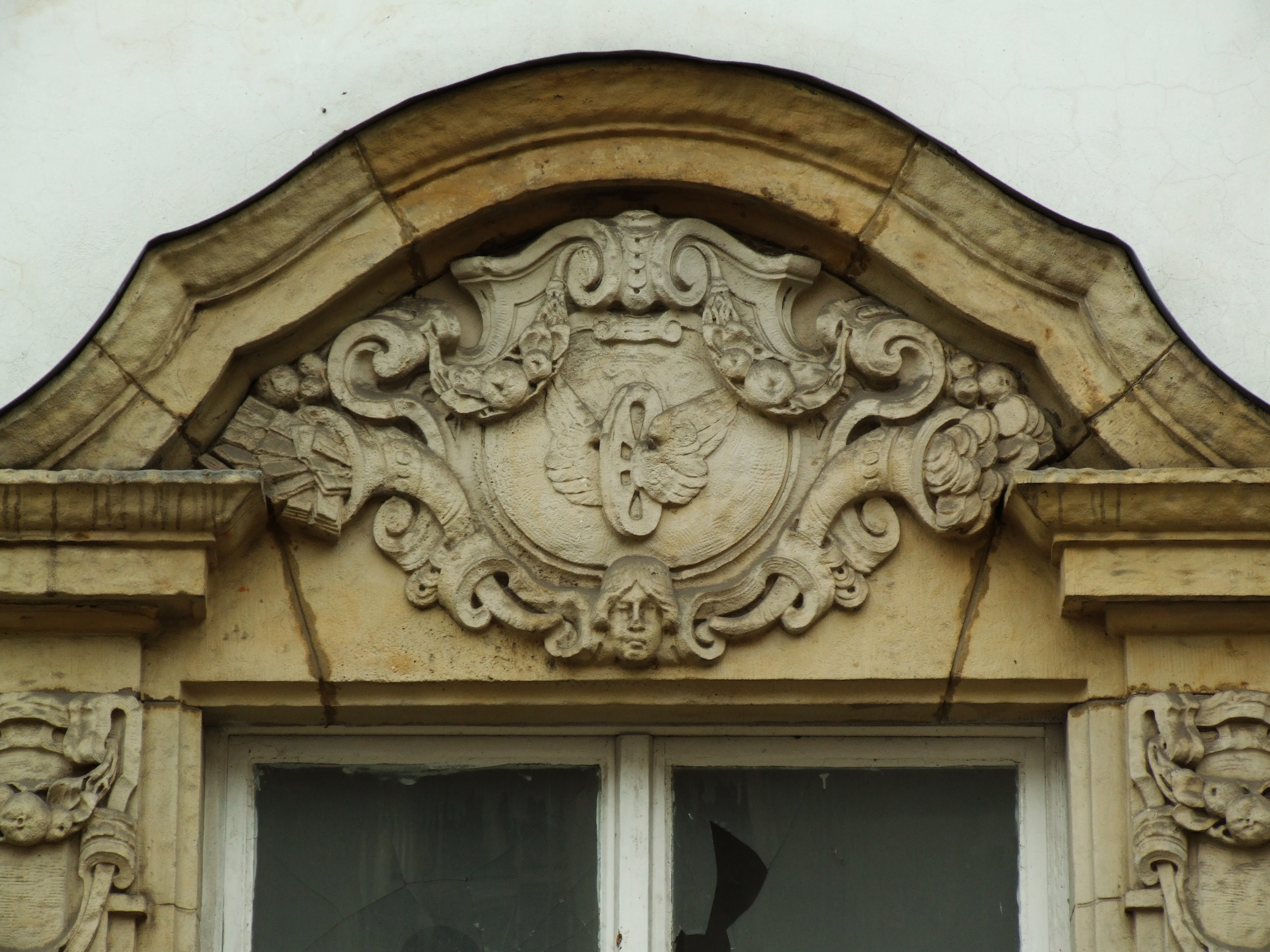
Facade detail

Katowice historic railway station was the main railway station of Katowice, in the Silesia region of what is now Poland. Built in 1859 and reconstructed and expanded several times, it was judged obsolete after World War II, and in 1972 decommissioned and replaced by the newly built Katowice railway station. Three years later it was declared a National Monument. It is partially ruined and owned by a private developer who plans to renovate the station buildings and develop the complex into a multifunctional center.

The station mixes neoclassical and modernist historical architecture styles and has been described as "one of the most interesting European railway stations from the architectural perspective".

== History ==
The Upper Silesian Railway (Oberschlesische Eisenbahn, OSE) line, operated by the Upper Silesian Railway Company, was the first railway line in today's Poland. In 1842 it extended from Wrocław via Oława to Brzeg. In the years thereafter it was steadily expanded until it reached Katowice and Mysłowice in 1846. Shortly afterward, in 1848, OSE was connected to the Austrian Kraków and Upper Silesian Railway and the international Warsaw–Vienna railway.

The railway station at Katowice opened on 7 October 1846. At its inception the station was intended primarily as a maintenance and resupply stop for passing trains; Katowice was simply a convenient location en route to Mysłowice and the other railway lines to connect to. But Katowice soon grew in importance due to the railway station's existence. With Baildon Steelworks and several coal mines expanding and taking advantage of the train station, Katowice quickly became one of the most important cities of Upper Silesia, receiving city rights in 1865. The city kept growing, becoming the capital of the Autonomous Silesian Voivodeship in the Second Polish Republic in the aftermath of World War I. The representative neoclassical station, completed in 1859, grew together with the city, quickly expanding beyond its original smaller purpose, and consequently, size.

Near the end of the 19th century the station was split into the passenger terminal, located at the historical site, and a new cargo terminal at the site of the modern Katowice railway station. A major expansion and reconstruction in the historic modernist style was completed in 1906, which is the year often given as the year the station was finished. The Polish monument listing also dates the station to that year, but other sources give 1908 as the year of reconstruction.

The passenger station, originally one story with two-story avant-corps, was heightened to three stories. Two side terminal buildings were constructed, which received another expansion and reconstruction in the 1920s. The main building was used by administration, while the side terminals, incorporating the train platforms, were for passenger use. The terminals were large enough to provide additional services, from hosting commercial shops to sport facilities. By 1912 the station had seven platforms.

After World War II the train station was judged obsolete, primarily because of the inefficient layout of the platforms. The construction of the new station began in the 1950s, and the old station was closed in 1972, the year the new station opened. It was classified as a monument in 1975, listed in the National Register of Monuments with the number "A - 1218/75". Since then, the old train station has fallen into disrepair. Partially ruined, it has been owned since 2007 by a private developer who plans to renovate the station buildings and develop the complex into a multifunctional center. The reconstruction has been subject to repeated delays, much to the annoyance of the Katowice inhabitants. The ruined state of this historic building is one of the most controversial issues in the modern history of Katowice, leading to repeated news coverage of occasional demonstrations by concerned citizens.
