= Bolewice, Greater Poland Voivodeship =

Bolewice
- Village
- Location within Poland
- Coordinates: 52°23′49″N 16°7′8″E
- Country: Poland
- Voivodeship: Greater Poland
- County: Nowy Tomyśl
- Gmina: Miedzichowo
- Population: 1,900

Bolewice [bɔlɛˈvit͡sɛ] is a village in the administrative district of Gmina Miedzichowo, within Nowy Tomyśl County, Greater Poland Voivodeship, in west-central Poland.
