= Edgar Norwerth =

Polish architect

- Born: 7 April 1884; Coppet, Switzerland
- Died: 19 September 1950 (aged 66); Warsaw, Poland
- Occupation: Architect

Edgar Norwerth (7 April 1884 – 19 September 1950) was a Polish architect. His work was part of the art competitions at the 1928 Summer Olympics and the 1932 Summer Olympics.
