= Józef Hauke-Bosak =

Polish general (1834–1871)

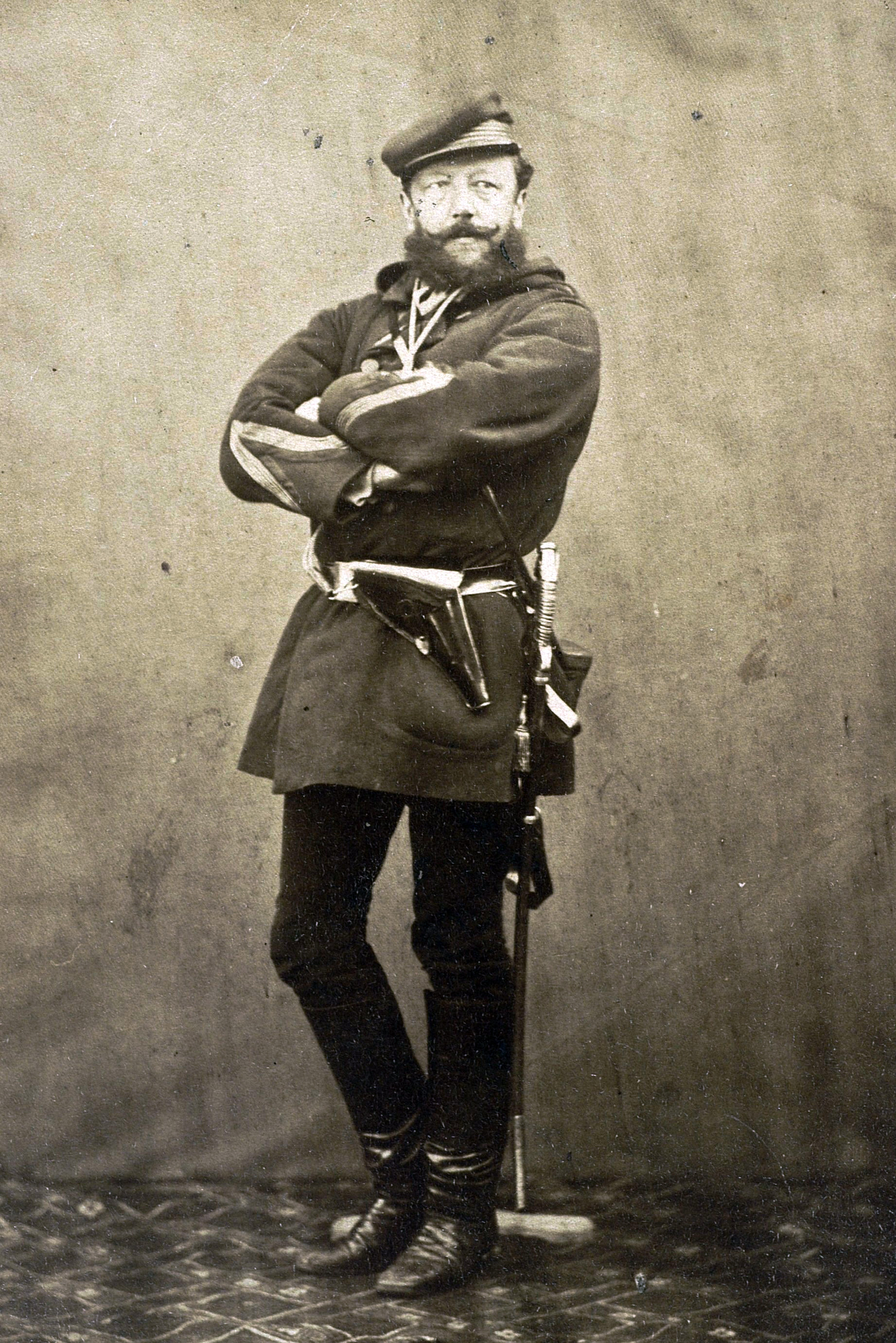
Portrait in the National Library of Poland

Józef Hauke-Bosak (19 March 1834 – 21 January 1871) was a Polish military leader of the January Uprising. A close ally of rebel leader Romuald Traugutt, Hauke-Bosak commanded the Polish Army in Lesser Poland, where he fought many successful battles against the Russians. He left Poland after the uprising collapsed in 1864. Hauke-Bosak was killed in battle while serving in the French Army during the Franco-Prussian War.

== Biography ==
Hauke-Bosak was born in Saint Petersburg on 19 March 1834, the son of Józef Hauke, an aide-de-camp to Tsar Nicholas I and former officer in the Army of the Duchy of Warsaw, and Karolina Steinkeller. He was a nephew of Piotr Antoni Steinkeller, a prominent industrialist, and a cousin to Countess Julia von Hauke, Princess von Battenberg. After his military education in Saint Petersburg, Hauke-Bosak began a brilliant career in the Russian Imperial Army. He served in the Caucasus War and reached the rank of colonel.

In 1863, Hauke-Bosak left the Russian Army and took up arms for the January Uprising in Poland. He was appointed general by the Polish National Government and took command of troops in Lesser Poland, becoming a close ally of rebel leader Romuald Traugutt. Hauke-Bosak emigrated to Dresden in April 1864, following the uprising's defeat, then moved to Geneva and Italy, where he joined Giuseppe Garibaldi. He settled in Geneva in 1867, where he was active in the Polish émigré community as a member of the committee of the Union de l'émigration polonaise and the Foyer polonais.

Hauke-Bosak adhered to the League of Peace and Freedom and notably authored La Grève (1869) and Manuel d'organisation et de combat for the workers of Le Creusot. On the outbreak of the Franco-Prussian War, he joined the Army of the Vosges, a volunteer unit in the French Army led by Garibaldi, and was given command of its 1st Brigade. Hauke-Bosak was killed in action at the Third Battle of Dijon on 21 January 1871, aged 36. He was buried in Carouge in the canton of Geneva.
