= Polish National Government (January Uprising) =

Revolutionary government during the January Uprising in Poland

National Government Rząd Narodowy
- 1863–1864
- Flag Coat of arms
- Motto: Latin: Si Deus Nobiscum quis contra nos (If God is with us, then who is against us); Latin: Pro Fide, Lege et Rege (For Faith, Law and King)
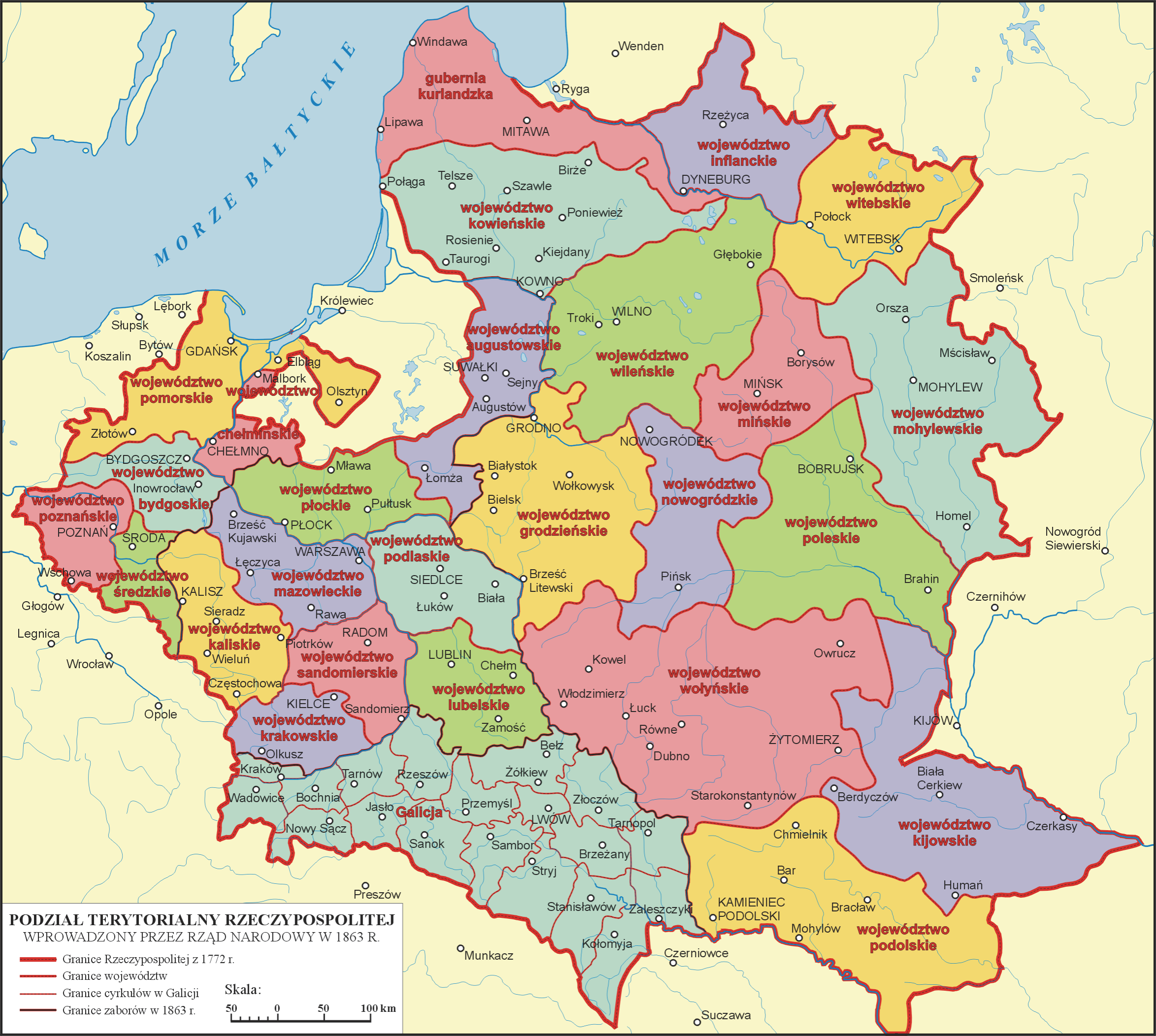
- Claimed borders of the Polish–Lithuanian–Ruthenian Commonwealth during the January Uprising
- Capital: Warsaw; Vilnius; Kyiv
- Common languages: Polish; Belarusian; Ukrainian; Lithuanian
- Religion: Roman Catholic Church; Belarusian Greek Catholic Church; Ukrainian Catholic Church Eastern Orthodoxy
- Government: Shadow government
- Dictator of the Uprising
- Reds
- Legislature: Sejm
- History
  - January Uprising: January 22 1863
  - Disestablished: 1864
Preceded by	Succeeded by
Russian Empire	Russian Empire
- Today part of: Poland Lithuania Belarus Ukraine Russia Latvia

The Polish National Government of 1863–64 was an underground Polish supreme authority during the January Uprising, a large scale insurrection during the Russian partition of the former territories of the Polish–Lithuanian Commonwealth. It had a collegial form, resided in Warsaw and was headed by Karol Majewski. It was intended as a temporary government, and functioned as an administrative institution with many ministries and departments.

During 1863–1864 it was a real shadow government supported by the majority of Poles who even paid taxes for it, and a significant problem for the Russian secret police (Third Section). "It organized one of the world's earliest campaigns of urban guerrilla warfare", according to Norman Davies. It became the prototype for the Polish Secret State during World War II.

It was designed to be able to unite Poland in a national struggle, and claimed all of the pre-partition Polish-Lithuanian Commonwealth lands.

The last "dictator" of the National Government was Romuald Traugutt, who was arrested from the night of the 10th to 11 April 1864 by Russian authorities. With his execution, the uprising had its symbolic end.

== Legacy ==
The National Government was an inspiration for many Poles throughout the rest of the 19th and early 20th century, including Józef Piłsudski, who was inspired by it to create his Polish Legions. In official documents of the time, Piłsudski uses the name of the Rząd Narodowy with the coat of arms of the 1863 January Uprising.

All the fallen veterans and participants of the government were awarded posthumously with the Cross of Independence by Polish President Ignacy Mościcki on 21 January 1931, in the already-independent Poland.

== Biography ==
- Aleksander Waszkowski (1841-1865) President of the Polish National Government (April 1864 - Arrested Dec 1864), executed 1865
- Davies, Norman (2005). God's playground: a history of Poland. Vol. 2. Oxford [u.a.]: Oxford University Press. ISBN 9780199253401.
