= Leon Przanowski =

Polish army officer and statesman (1844-1923)

Major General Leon Przanowski KVM SVM
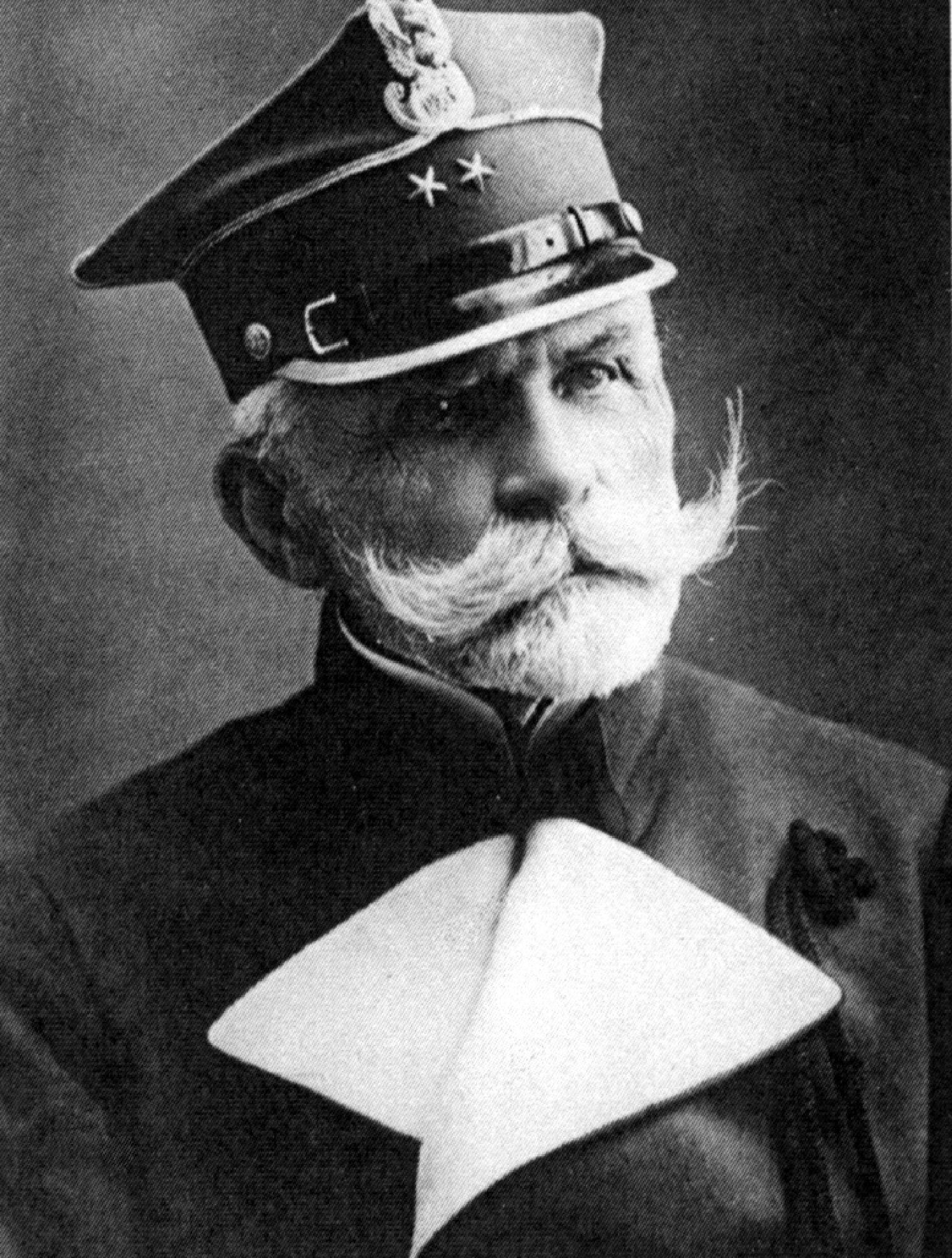
- Przanowski, 1900

3rd Commander-in-Chief of the Polish Voluntary Division of the French Expeditionary Force
- In office 10 February 1866 – 1 March 1867

Adjutant General of the Polish National Government
- In office 6 September 1863 – 14 April 1864
- Preceded by: Marcin Borelowski
- Succeeded by: Office Abolished

Personal details
- Born: 6 November 1844 Celejów, Congress Poland, Russian Empire
- Died: 5 March 1924 (aged 79) Lublin, Second Republic of Poland
- Resting place: Lipowa Street Cemeteries, Lublin, Poland; 53.759°N 23.914°E
- Parent: Wojciech Józef Przanowski
- Awards: Commander of the War Order of Virtuti Militari; Knight of the War Order of Virtuti Militari

Military service
- Allegiance: Polish National Government; Second Polish Republic
- Branch/service: Army
- Rank: Adjutant General
- Battles/wars: See battles: January Uprising; Battle of Panasówka; Battle of Sowia Góra; Battle of Staszów; Battle of Małogoszcz; Battle of Grochowiska
- Selected battles

Leon Józef Przanowski (6 November 1844 - 5 March 1924) was a Polish military official, landowner and statesman who served as adjutant general of the Polish Armed Forces during the January Uprising and commander-in-chief of the Polish Voluntary Division of the French Expeditionary Force.

== Early life (1844-1863) ==
Leon Przanowski was born on 6 November 1844 at the ancestral summer residence of his family, Celejów, Lublin. He was a son of Wojciech Józef Przanowski (b. 1790), a Napoleonic legionnaire and captain in the Polish Army during the Duchy of Warsaw, who had been awarded the Gold Cross of Virtuti Militari by Prince Józef Poniatowski. His mother was Maria Przanowska (née Wessel) from the prominent clerical and scholarly Wessel herbu Rogala family. He attended secondary school in Lublin and later moved to Warsaw to study at the Institute of Rural and Forestry Management in Marymont. After the Russian authorities closed the institute in 1862, he continued his studies at the Polytechnic and Agricultural Institute in Puławy.

== January Uprising (1863-1864) ==
In January 1863, Perzanowski swore allegiance to the Polish National Government and fought commanded by Gustaw Zakrzewski. On 3 September 1863, at the Battle of Panasówka, he served as commander of the 1st Cavalry Division. He distinguished himself with exceptional bravery by leading a heroic charge and breaking through the enemy lines This earned him a promotion to lieutenant commander of the forces.

Perzanowski also participated in the Battle of Batorz, where Marcin Borelowski was killed. Przanowski then joined the forces led by general Dionizy Czachowski, serving as the adjutant general of the central military command of the national government.

== Second Franco-Mexican War (1864-1867) ==
After the uprising, he traveled to Belgium, enrolling at the Polytechnic and Agricultural Institute of Ghent University. During this period, he became involved in various royalist movements and co-founded the Polish Youth Society of Belgium. In 1866, he traveled to Mexico where his father was stationed. Upon his arrival, Perzanowski succeeded his father as commander-in-chief of the Polish Voluntary Division of the French Expeditionary Forces. In 1867, after defeated by the Mexican Republican Forces, he returned Belgium.

== Civilian life (1869-1923) ==
=== Return to Poland (1869-1873) ===
In 1869, he returned to Poland, where, as a former insurgent, he was imprisoned. Released under an amnesty, he remained under police supervision for many years. In 1873, he acquired a modest estate in the village of Krasne. Contemporary documentation from the village notes that it took several years of hard work before the farm began to turn a profit, with his horse breeding later earning a strong reputation.

=== Civilian Career (1873-1923) ===
After acquiring the estate, Przanowski became increasingly active in social causes. He participated in landowner assemblies and worked within the Land Credit Society, becoming president of its Lublin branch in 1902. From 1913, he served as general counsel of the Lublin Mutual Credit Society and was also the president of the executive committee of the Lublin branch of the Nobles' Land Bank.

He supported local industry, helped organize the Cooperative Sugar Factory Society of Lublin, and was president of the Milejów Sugar Factory. On May 31, 2022, a 120 square meter mural was created in Ostrowiec Świętokrzyski on the wall of the Sugar Industry Memory Chamber, featuring Leon Przanowski, Henryk Łubieński, and the Izabelin Sugar Factory in Glinojeck. The artwork highlights the contribution of sugar industry figures to Poland's fight for independence. He also founded the Lublin Agricultural Society, promoting the use of artificial fertilizers, catch crops, and fodder.

On August 11, 1905, Przanowski, his brother-in-law Tadeusz Rojowski, and several other citizens of Lublin established a humanistic school known as the Eight-Year Private Philological School of Lublin, popularly called the Lublin School. It later became known as the Stefan Batory Private Boys’ High School, a landmark in Lublin's educational history. His influence also led to the establishment of the H. Łopaciński Public Library on April 26, 1908. Around this time, he became involved with the Lublin Charitable Society and during World War I, he organized aid for those in need, including veterans of the January Uprising.

== Late life (1923-1924) ==
In September 1923, he was the representative of the January Uprising veterans during the president of the Republic of Poland, Stanisław Wojciechowski, visit to Lublin. Przanowski had previously served with Feliks Wojciechowski, the father of Stanisław. A year before his death, he was honored with the War Order of Virtuti Militari. He was buried in Lublin at the Lipowa Street Cemeteries.

== Family ==
On his paternal side, Perzanowski was from the princely House of Perzanowo. He was the grandson of Wojciech-Jerzy Przanowski and great-grandson of Józef Przanowski who was the of Łubowice. His cousin Edward Przanowski was also a prominent figure in the January Uprising and his nephews are noted as ministers, military officials and scholars.

== Sources ==
=== Prints ===
- Słownik biograficzny adwokatów polskich, tom II, zeszyt 3/4: M–Ż. Warszawa, 2007 (author biogramu: Marek Wasiak)
- P. Majewski, Posłowie i senatorowie Rzeczypospolitej Polskiej 1919–1939: słownik biograficzny. Tom 4: M–P. Warszawa: Wydawnictwo Sejmowe, 2009.
- Przanowski Stefan (1874–1938), [w:] Polski Słownik Biograficzny. Wrocław: Ossolineum, 1985 tom XXVIII/4, s. 640–642 (author biogramu: Ryszard Szwoch).
- Ministrowie Polski Niepodległej 1918–1945, pod red. Marka Baumgarta, Henryka Walczaka i Adama Wątora. Szczecin: Wyd. Naukowe Uniwersytetu Szczecińskiego, 2001, s. 327–329, ISBN 83-7241-146-8.
- Encyklopedia historii gospodarczej Polski do 1945 roku.
- Encyklopedia Warszawy (supplement).
- Słownik biograficzny techników polskich, tom 10 (author biogramu: Józef Piłatowicz).
