= Battle of Święty Krzyż =

1863 battle

- Part of January Uprising
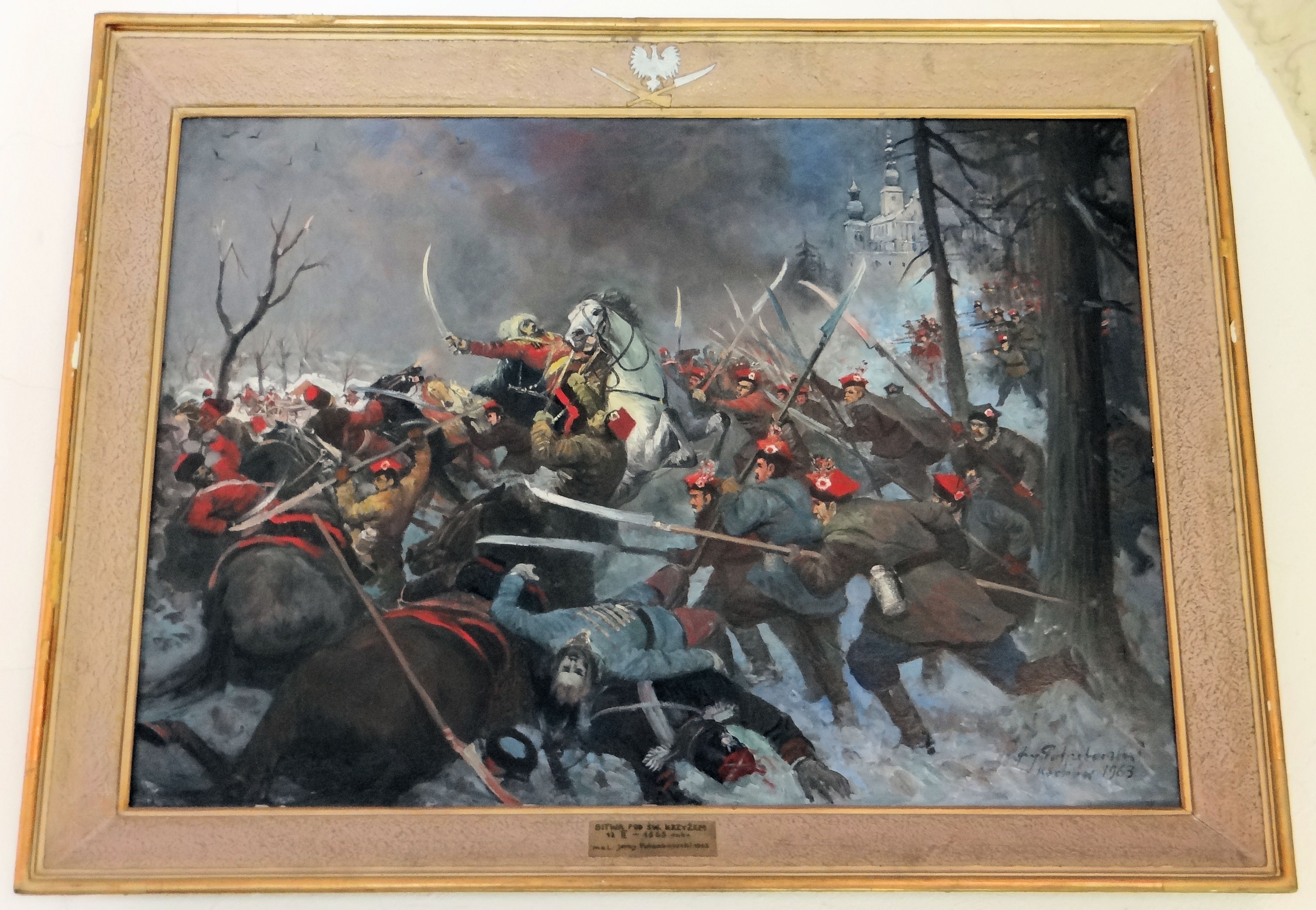
- The Battle of Święty Krzyż in a painting from the collection of the Cistercian Abbey Museum in Wąchock
Date	12 February 1863
Location	Łysa Góra, Congress Poland (Now modern day Poland) 50°51′37″N 21°02′49″E
Status	Polish insurgent victory

Belligerents
(Poland) Polish insurgents	Russian Empire

Commanders and leaders
gen. Marian Langiewicz; col. Dionizy Czachowski	gen. Xaverius Chengeri

Units involved
~1000	~1200

Casualties and losses
18 dead	~60
- Location within Poland

Battle of Święty Krzyż – was one of the battles in the January Uprising. It took place on the 12 February 1863 between Polish Insurgents and the Russian Army.

== Background ==
After the battles in Wąchock, Marian Langiewicz set up two camps – one under the command of Dionizy Czachowski at the foot of the mountain, in Nowa Słupia, and the other in a former Benedictine monastery on Łysa Góra. He stayed there for several days, wanting to gather the insurgents scattered after the battles in Wąchock (his unit then numbered about 1,000 people).

== The Battle ==
Russian troops consisting of six infantry companies and 60 Cossacks set out against the Poles. Xaverius Chengeri also set off with five companies, half a squadron of dragoons and several dozen Cossacks. At around 9 a.m., he divided his forces and attacked the insurgents stationed in Słupia and on the hill. The insurgents took up favorable positions near the forest near Słupia Nowa. On the hill, the Russians were fired upon from behind the walls and windows of the monastery, forcing them to retreat. During the battle wooden cannons were used. The battle ended after four hours. The next day Langiewicz left Święty Krzyż and made his way to Staszowa.

The use of wooden cannons during the battle was described in the memoirs of Władysław Zapałowski:

On the Słupia side – as this was the only place from which an attack was possible, a battery was set up and two wooden cannons were placed, similar to those used by General Bem during the Hungarian Revolution of 1848. These cannons were laughed at, but as will soon become apparent, they rendered great service. [...] Our men, scattered throughout the forest and bushes in skirmish formation, bravely faced the enemy, and when the enemy drew closer and closer, Langiewicz ordered the wooden cannons to fire. The enemy, astonished and not expecting to find cannons, was pelted with a hail of bullets and the persistence of the scythemen, and began to retreat.

Jan K. Janowski, a veteran of the Uprising, writes in his memoirs about the victory as follows:

Our riflemen in the battle of Słupia were hidden in the forest, while the Muscovites were in completely open terrain [...] in the battle near the monastery, our riflemen fired from behind walls and windows, and they were the best riflemen.

== Aftermath ==
The exposed Russians suffered heavy losses (according to Jan K. Janowski's Memoirs of the January Uprising, the Russians must have had at least 60 killed). The insurgents' losses were minor – historian Stanisław Zieliński gives the number of 18 insurgents killed.

Jan K. Janowski also writes his memoirs about the aftermath:

The enemy retreated. The Russians must have had at least 60 dead and many wounded. This estimate is not exaggerated, as we later learned that the Muscovites buried their dead in three pits in Huta Stara and needed several dozen carts for their wounded.

== Monuments and commemoration ==
- Commemorative plaque on the wall of the monastery building, which now houses the Świętokrzyski National Park Museum.
- On 15 September 2013, a ceremony commemorating the 150th anniversary of the January Uprising was held at the monastery in Święty Krzyż. On the same day, a commemorative plaque dedicated to the January Uprising was unveiled, located in the porch of the Basilica in Święty Krzyż.

== In popular culture ==
- In 1963 Jerzy Pietrzakowski painted Walki na Świętym Krzyżu (English: Battles on Swięty Kryż) and it is displayed at the Wąchock Abbey).
- Stanisław Prauss painted Partia Powstańcza na Św. Krzyżu rok 1863 (English: The Insurgent Party at Swięty Kryż in 1863).
