= Panasówka =

- Village
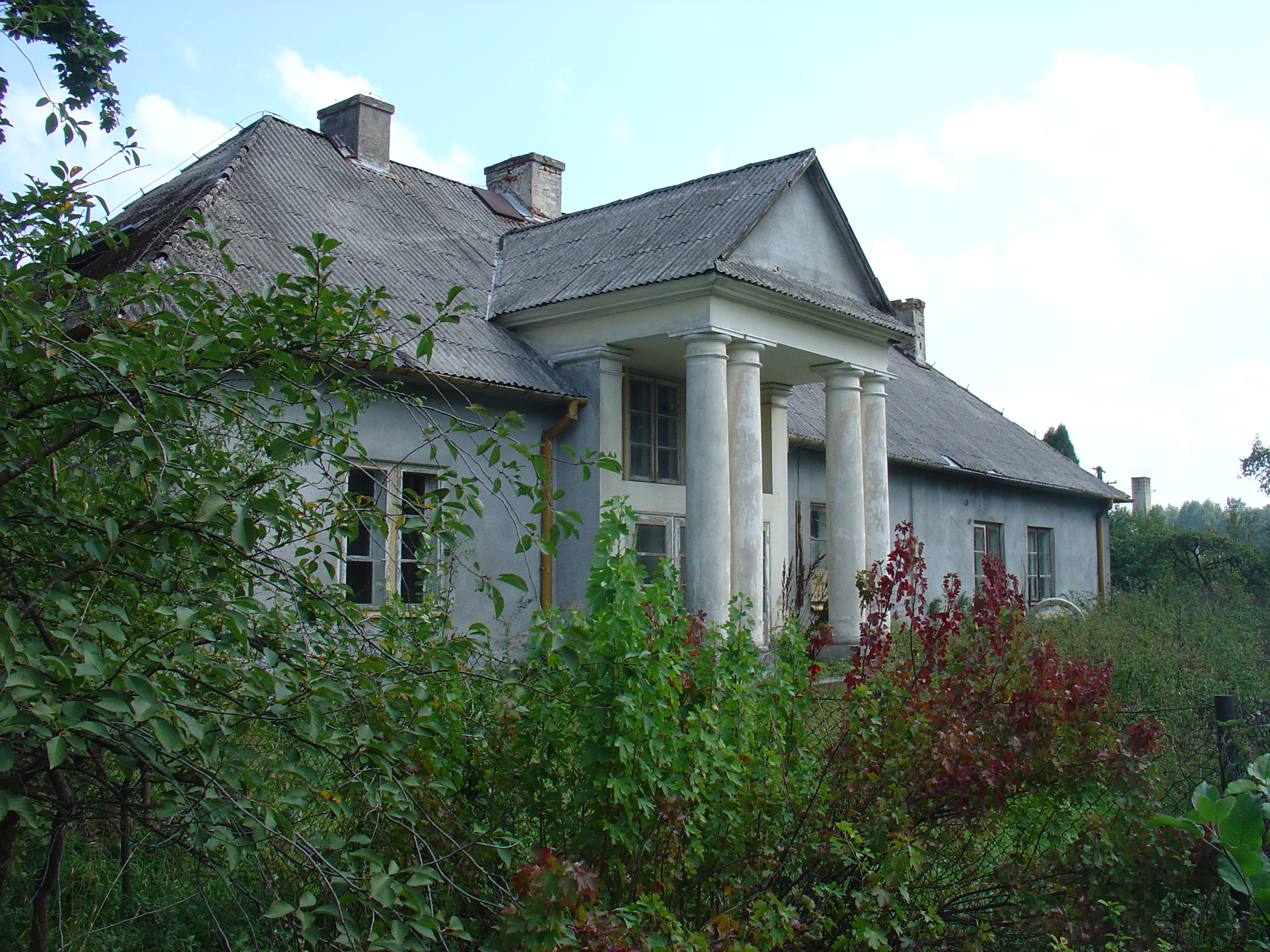
- Traditional Polish manor house

- Location within Poland
- Coordinates: 50°36′11″N 22°52′43″E
- Country: Poland
- Voivodeship: Lublin
- County: Biłgoraj
- Gmina: Tereszpol

Population
  - Total: 266
- Time zone: UTC+1 (CET)
  - Summer (DST): UTC+2 (CEST)
- Vehicle registration: LBL

Panasówka [panaˈsufka] is a village in the administrative district of Gmina Tereszpol, within Biłgoraj County, Lublin Voivodeship, in eastern Poland.

On 3 September 1863, the Battle of Panasówka, one of the largest battles of the January Uprising, was fought near the village. In the battle, Polish insurgents supported by Hungarian volunteers defeated much more numerous Russian troops.
