= Stanisław Brzóska =

Polish general and priest (1832–1865)

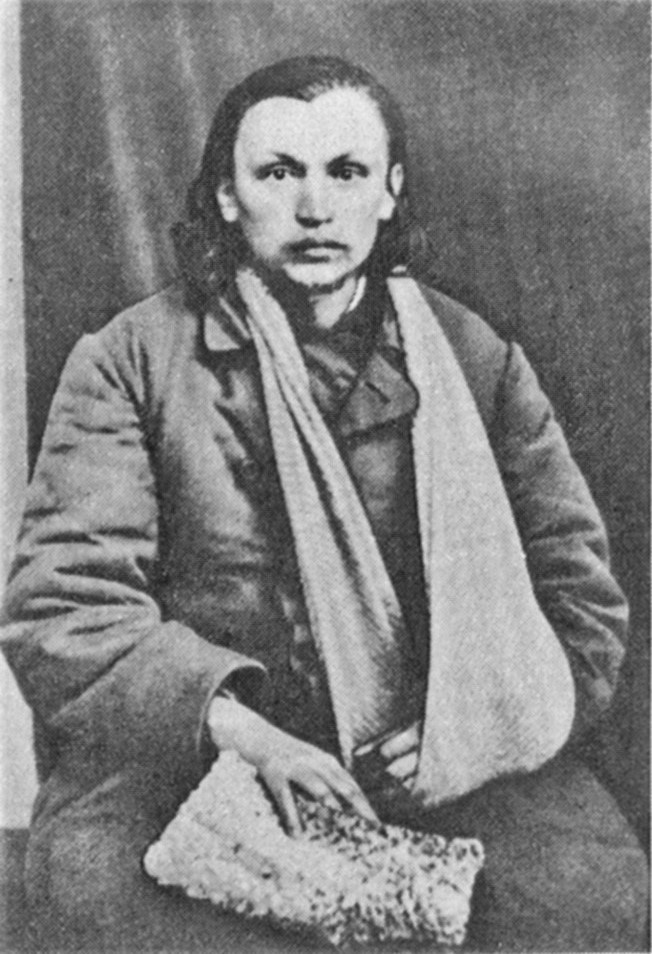

Stanisław Brzóska (December 30, 1832, Dokudów Pierwszy – May 23, 1865, Sokołów Podlaski) was a Polish priest, general, one of leaders of the Polish insurgency and the last partisan of the January Uprising. He commanded the Polish detachment in South Podlasie and northern Lesser Poland, defeating the Russians in many skirmishes. He was captured eventually in April 1865, sentenced to death by the Russians and hanged publicly in Sokołów Podlaski in the presence of a crowd of 10,000 people.

Stanislaw was the son of Marceli Brzoska and Karolina née Enskajt. He was born into South Podlasie branch of an ancient Mazovian noble family, which came from the Land of Różan. His coat of arms was the Nowina.

At the age of seventeen, Brzoska entered Kiev University, where he studied for three years. Brzoska then moved to Janów Podlaski, joining the local Roman – Catholic seminar. On July 25, 1858, he officially became a priest, and soon afterwards, was named a vicar in Sokolow Podlaski, where he remained for three years. In early 1861, Brzoska was transferred to Łuków, where on March 10, 1861, he was arrested by Tsarist authorities for patriotic, pro-Polish sermons. The young priest was sentenced by Russian military court for two years at Zamość Fortress, but was eventually released after three months.

In January 1863, the January Uprising began in Congress Poland and other territories of former Polish–Lithuanian Commonwealth. Brzoska was appointed leader of the anti-Russian rebellion in Łuków County, and on January 23, he formed a unit which attacked Russian garrison at Łuków. After this raid, the priest was named military chaplain of the uprising, and promoted to the rank of general. Brzoska participated in several skirmishes and battles: at Siemiatycze, Woskrzenice, Grezowka, Włodawa, Slawatycze and Fajslawice. In the spring of 1864 he organized a 40-men strong mounted unit, which operated in the region until late December.

In early 1865, Brzoska, together with his adiutant Franciszek Wilczynski, hid in the house of Ksawery Bielinski, soltys of the village of Krasnodeby-Sypytki, near Sokolow Podlaski. The Russians found out about this from Antonina Konarzewska, a courier of the Polish National Government, who had been captured and tortured by them.

In April 1865, the village was surrounded by the Russians. During an exchange of fire, Brzoska and Wilczynski were wounded and captured. The priest was sentenced to death, and the sentence was approved by Count Friedrich Wilhelm Rembert von Berg, the Namestnik of the Kingdom of Poland. The public execution took place on May 23, 1865, in the Sokolow Podlaski market square.

== Commemoration ==
On May 23, 1925, Brzoska's monument was unveiled in Sokolow Podlaski. A monument with a commemorative plaque is also located in the village of Krasnodeby-Sypytki; furthermore, another monument stands in a forest near the village of Dabrowka, Łuków County, where Brzoska hid for some time.

On May 23, 2008, Brzoska was posthumously awarded the Order of the White Eagle, by President Lech Kaczyński.
