= Stefan Brykczyński =

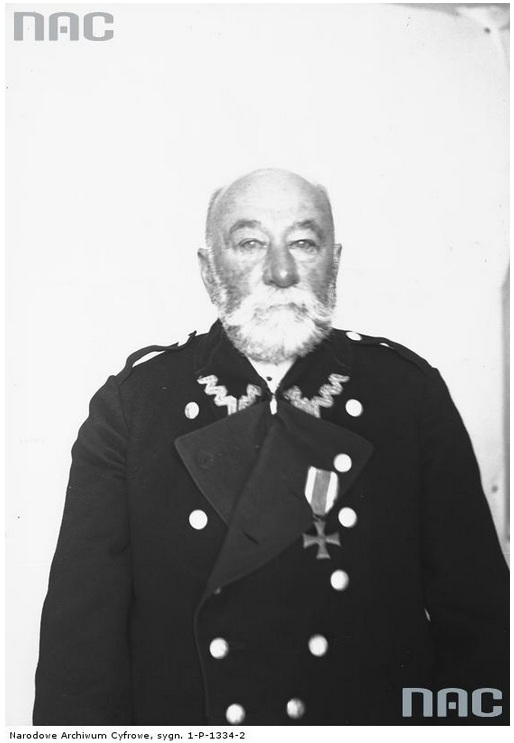
- Stefan Brykczyński
- Born: 1847; Ossa
- Died: May 1934 (aged 86–87); Kraków

Stefan Brykczyński (1847 – May 1934) was one of the members of 19th-century January Uprising in Poland. Today, he is mainly known as an author of his memories from uprising, which were the basis for the para-documentary movie Rok 1863 (Year 1863) released on the 150th anniversary of the uprising.

== Biography ==
Brykczyński was born 1847 in Ossa to Stanislaus Brykczyński, landowner, and his mother Countess Wanda Zamoyski. His brothers were Antoni and Stanislaw. He was educated first at the Institute of Nobles in Warsaw. In 1861, due to the demonstration of patriotism, he was removed from school and moved to the Lyceum in Lublin.

As a student he fought in the January uprising. In 1863, he joined the Krzeminski squad, and then John Żalplachty Zapałowicz. Wounded at the Battle of Mołożowem, he escaped to Lviv. He was aide of Kajetan Cieszkowski-Ćwiek. He fought in/near of Tyszowice, Tuczapy, Kowale, Wir i Puławu. Again wounded, was released from the squad and he restarted his education in Kielce. After the uprising, he graduated from high school in Lublin. His brothers Stanislaw, Anthony and Joseph Brykczyńscy, also took part in the uprising.

For his activity he was sentenced for the exile to Siberia. Pardoned for saving the life of a Russian soldier, he studied at the Faculty of Mathematics and Physics Main School in Warsaw. Active in Warsaw Christian workers in organizations as an educational speaker(something probably similar to teacher), gave about a hundred talks. In St. Petersburg, graduated from the Institute of Technology. Due to the ban on residence in the Kingdom of Poland worked as the director of a sugar factory in Podolia. After the Russian-Japanese War he settled in Warsaw, where he worked as a lecturer in educational organizations. Forced to leave the country, he went to Galicia and worked there in agriculture.

He published several pamphlets : "The cholera" (1906), "The benefits of learning to read good books" (1911). The culmination of his literary work was published in print in 1908: "My memories from 1863 ," which saw three editions. In 1923 he was awarded the Cross of Valour, and in 1930, the Cross of Independence with Swords. The last period of his life spent in Przytulisku Weteranów 1863r(something like Veteran Shelter of 1863) in Kraków.

He died on 27 May 1934 in Kraków and burial took place on Rakowice Cemetery in Kraków, in the tomb of Veterans, at the Ra part. At a chapel of Ossa is memory in honor of insurgents from 1863: Stanislaus, Anthony, Stephen and Joseph Brykczyńskich.
