= Celejów, Lublin Voivodeship =

Celejów
- Village
- Location within Poland
- Coordinates: 51°20′N 22°3′E
- Country: Poland
- Voivodeship: Lublin
- County: Puławy
- Gmina: Wąwolnica

Celejów [t͡sɛˈlɛjuf] is a village in the administrative district of Gmina Wąwolnica, within Puławy County, Lublin Voivodeship, in eastern Poland.
