= Dionizy Czachowski =

Polish general

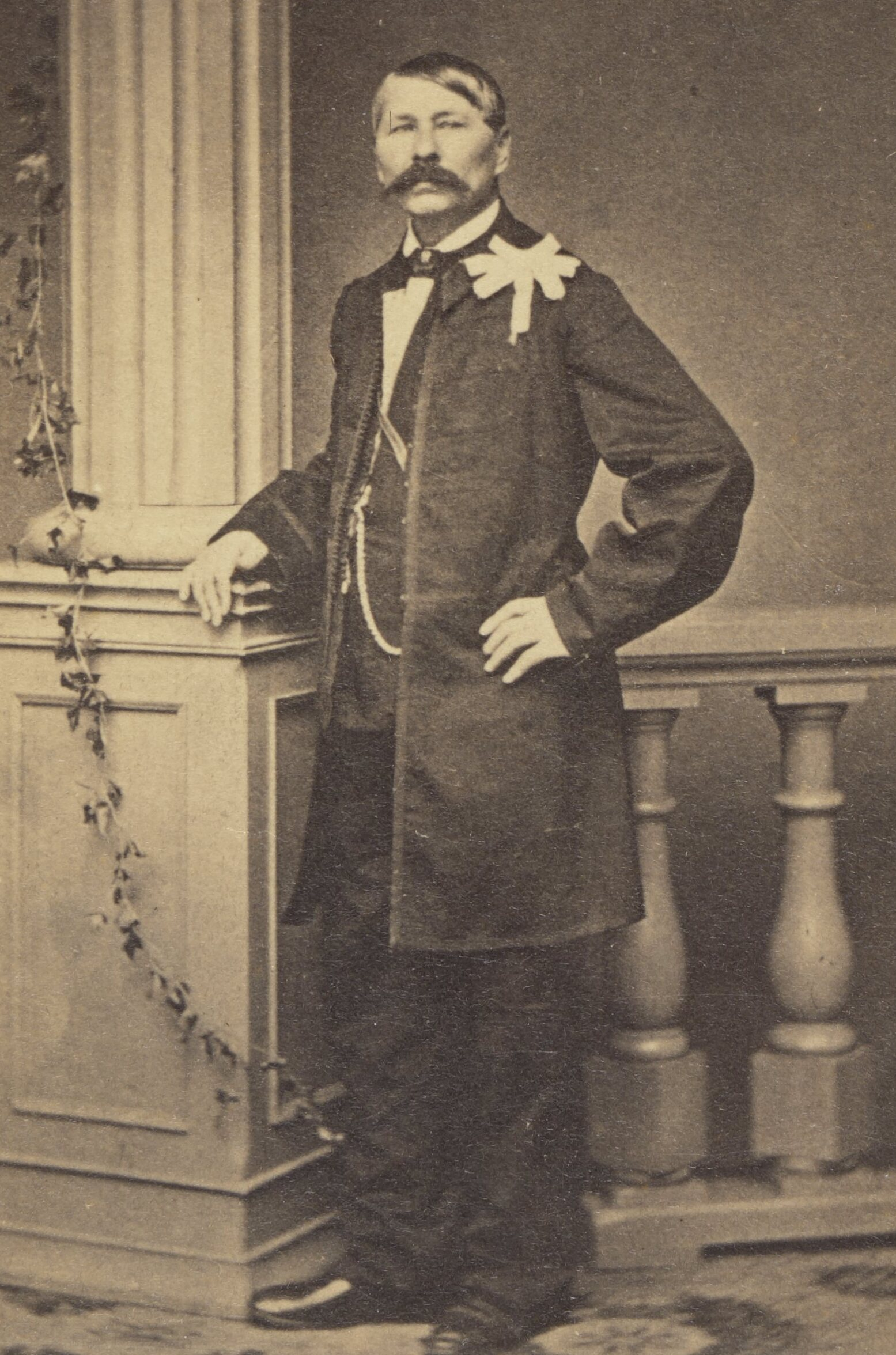
- Born: 6 April 1810
- Died: 6 November 1863 (aged 53)
- Military career
- Rank: General
- Conflicts: January Uprising

Dionizy Feliks Czachowski z Czachowa h. Korab (5 April 1810 in Niedabyl – 6 November 1863 in Jawor Solecki, Mazowieckie) was a Polish general and commander of the Sandomierz Voivodeship during the 1863 January Uprising in Congress Poland.

Dionizy, through his mother, was a sixth cousin of the Polish composer Frédéric Chopin; the two shared a great-grandfather.

He played a role in the preparations for the uprising by, among other endeavors, using his personal fortune to purchase a large number of horses from the Russian army in 1862. In 1863 he joined the uprising and reported himself at an insurrectionists' concentration point at Łysa Góra. He originally was given the rank of colonel.

Under General Marian Langiewicz Czachowski, he fought in various battles and skirmishes, including at the battles of Staszów, Małogoszcz and Grochowiska. After the latter battle, following Langiewicz's orders he crossed over into the Sandomierz Voivodeship, where on 14 April 1863 he was named the overall commander of the region and given an independent command.

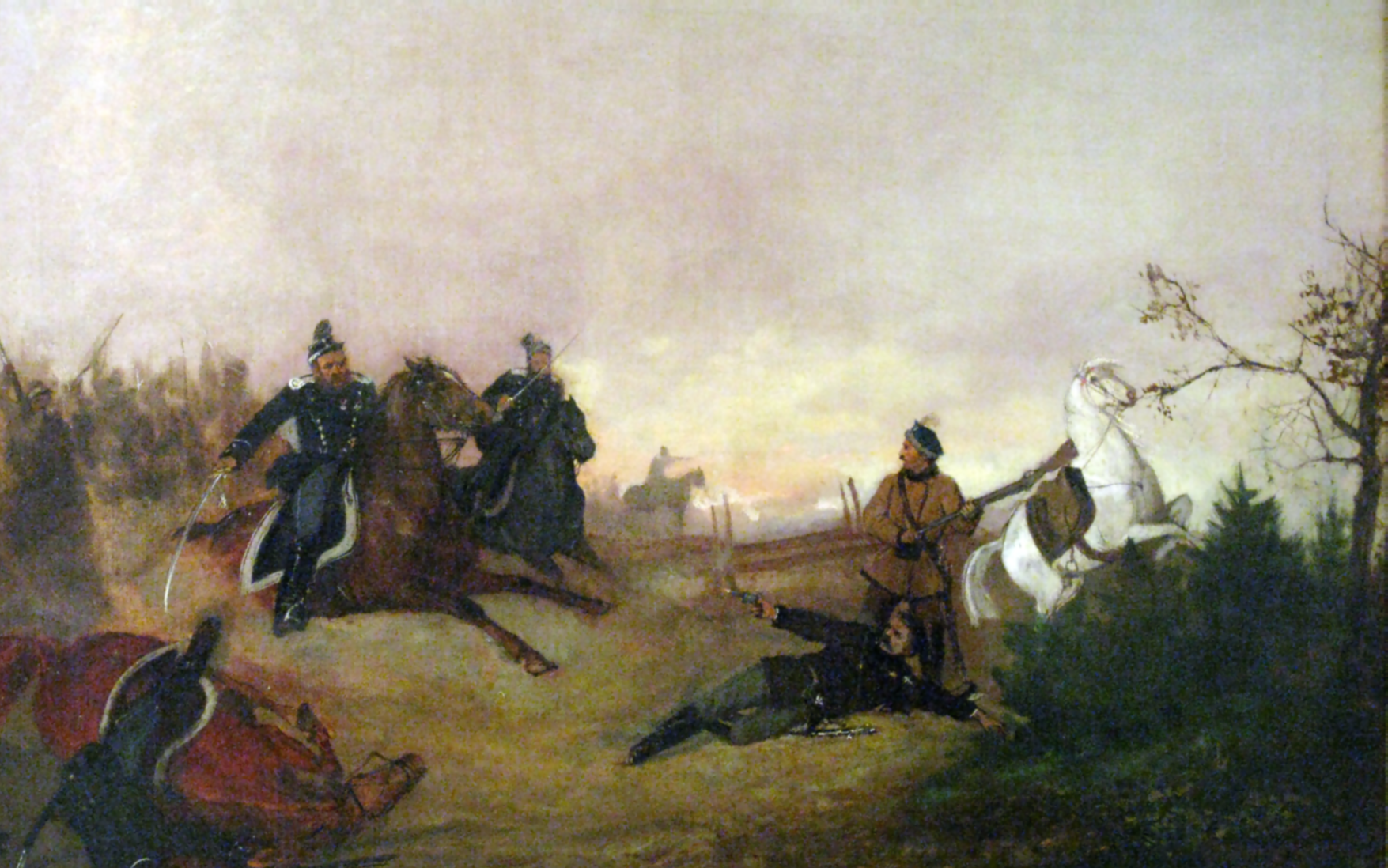
"Death of Dinonizy Czachowski" by Antoni Piotrowski

He was promoted to the rank of general in October 1863. In November of that year his unit, stationed in the forest near Zwoleń, was tracked down by Russian forces. While trying to retreat Czachowski was cornered near the village of Jawor Solecki, Mazowieckie, and there he died.
