= Battle of Staszów =

Coordinates: 50°33′51″N 21°10′01″E

- Part of January Uprising
- Polish partisan 1863 by Maksymilian Gierymski
Date	17 February 1863
Location	Staszów
Result	Indecisive • Town plundered

Belligerents
Poland	Russian Empire

Commanders and leaders
General Marian Langiewicz	Colonel Zagriashko

Strength
600	Unknown

Casualties and losses
Unknown	Unknown

The Battle of Staszów was part of the Polish January Uprising of 1863. When the uprising erupted Staszów became a gathering place for Russian infantry and artillery in the area, on the belief that Commander Marian Langiewicz was headquartered in the town.

On February 12, 1863, Langiewicz's unit of 600 men departed in the direction of Raków from Święty Krzyż, as Langiewicz was unable to hold his troops against a Russian assault. While trying to outmanoeuvre the Russians Langiewicz entered Staszów on 14 February. The Polish revolutionaries waited for a Russian attack, it came on February 17. The Russian armies were under the command of Colonel Zagriashko, on February 18 the Polish revolutionaries finally withdrew their forces from Staszów and left towards Małgoszcz, although the battle is considered one of Poland's victories of the uprising.

The town was plundered by the Russians after the Polish forces left, although the Russians only plundered Polish homes, the Jews of Staszów in turn bought the looted goods from the Russians for 500 rubles, and when the Russians left the town, the Jews returned the robbed goods to their Polish owners, without demanding any payment.
