= January Uprising =

1863 Polish–Lithuanian revolt in the Russian Empire

- Part of the Polish-Russian wars
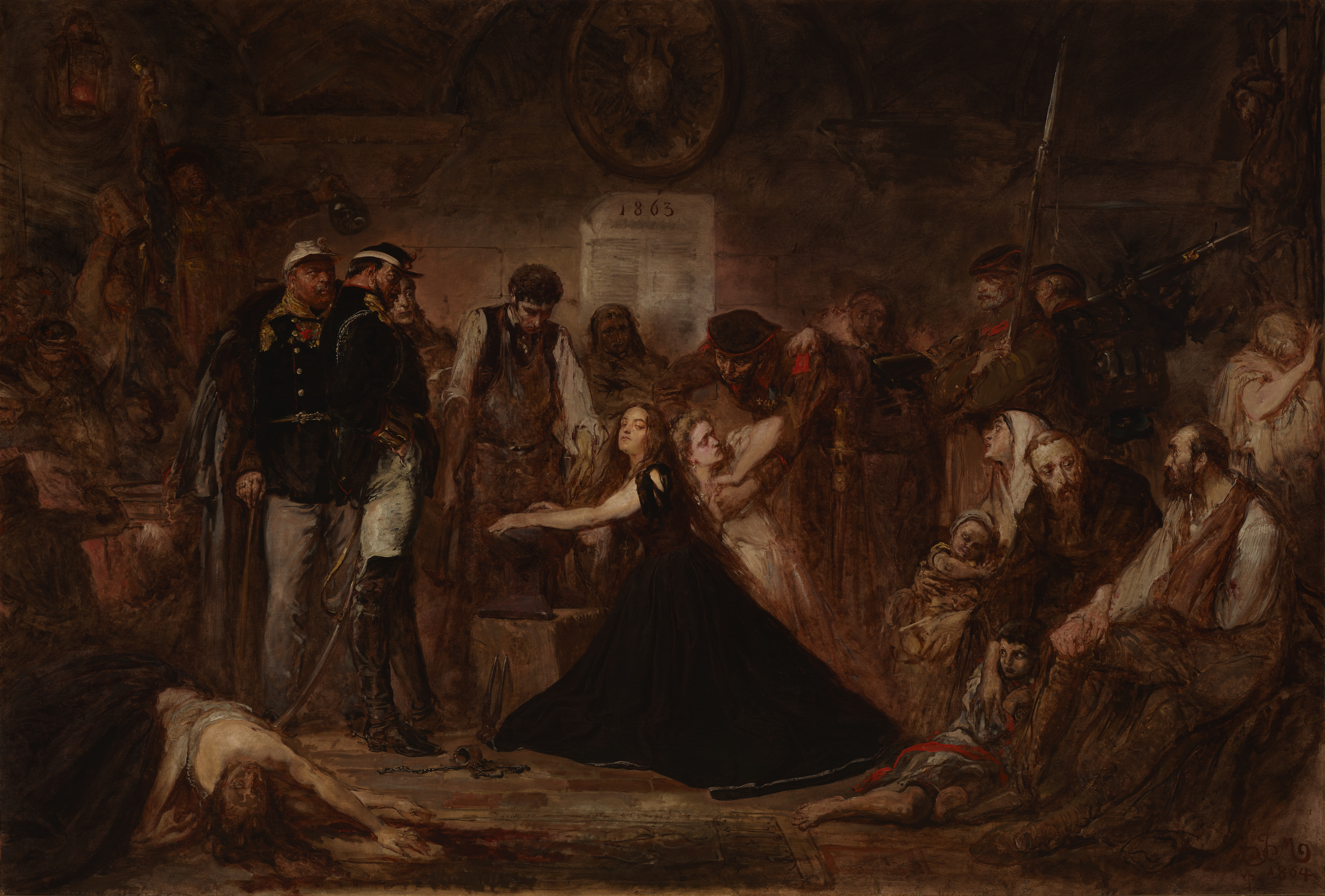
- Poland - The Year 1863, by Jan Matejko, 1864, oil on canvas, 156 × 232 cm, National Museum, Kraków. Pictured is the aftermath of the failed January 1863 Uprising. Captives await transportation to Siberia. Russian officers and soldiers supervise a blacksmith placing shackles on a woman (Polonia). The blonde girl next to her represents Ruthenia. The partially naked, bleeding girl lying on the floor represents Lithuania.
Date	22 January 1863 – 18 June 1864 (1 year, 148 days) (though the last insurgent, Stanisław Brzóska, fought into 1865)
Location	Poland, Lithuania, Belarus, Latvia and Ukraine, then part of the Russian Empire
Result	Russian victory

Belligerents
Russian Empire: Warsaw; Vilna; Kiev; Supported by: Kingdom of Prussia	Polish National Government: Rebels from the pre-partition lands of the Polish-Lithuanian Commonwealth; Garibaldi Legion; Foreign volunteers: (France) French volunteers; (United Kingdom) British volunteers; Hungarian volunteers

Commanders and leaders
Alexander II; Friedrich von Berg; Mikhail Muravyov	Stefan Bobrowski †; Romuald Traugutt (executed); Konstanty Kalinowski (executed); Ludwik Mierosławski; Marian Langiewicz

Strength
At least 220,000 by June 1864.	Around 200,000 over the course of the uprising. Around 20 men of the Garibaldi Legion.

Casualties and losses
Russian estimates: 4,500 killed, wounded and missing Polish estimates: 10,000 killed, wounded and missing	Polish estimates: 10,000 to 20,000; Russian estimates: 30,000 (22,000 killed and wounded, 7,000 captured)

The January Uprising (Note: Polish: powstanie styczniowe; Lithuanian: 1863 metų sukilimas; Ukrainian: Січневе повстання, romanized: Sichneve povstannya; Russian: Польское восстание, romanized: Pol'skoe vosstanie; Belarusian: Паўстанне 1863–1864 гадоў, romanized: Pawstannie 1863-1864 hadow) was an insurrection against Russian imperial rule in the Congress Kingdom of Poland and adjacent lands of the former Polish–Lithuanian Commonwealth. Sparked by nationalist aspirations, political repressions, religious differences and opposition to conscription, it was organized by the clandestine Central National Committee and subsequently by the revolutionary Polish National Government. It began on 22 January 1863 and continued until the last insurgents were captured in 1864.

A confluence of factors rendered the uprising inevitable in early 1863. The Polish nobility and urban bourgeois circles longed for the relative sovereignty they had enjoyed in Congress Poland before the previous 1830 November insurgency. The youth, encouraged by the success of the Italian independence movement, urgently desired the same outcome. The Russian Empire had been weakened by the Crimean War and had introduced a more liberal attitude in its internal politics which encouraged Poland's underground National Government to plan an organised strike no earlier than the spring of 1863. In an attempt to derail the Polish national movement, Aleksander Wielopolski, head of civil administration, brought forward to January the conscription of young Polish activists into the Imperial Russian Army for 20-year service. The decision sparked the January Uprising of 1863, the very outcome that Wielopolski and his subordinates had wanted to avoid.

Unlike earlier uprisings, the January Uprising relied mainly on irregular guerrilla warfare. The small partisan groups were lightly armed and avoided large-scale battles. Although the insurgents showed determination and enjoyed sympathy from parts of the population, they were deficient in weapons, training, and international military support. Leadership of the uprising changed several times, with figures such as Romuald Traugutt attempting to unify and strengthen the resistance. However, disagreements between conservative landowners (the "Whites") and radical reformers (the "Reds") weakened coordination. The rebellion by young Polish conscripts was, nonetheless, aided by high-ranking Polish-Lithuanian officers and members of the political class. Tsar Alexander II curtailed wider support for the insurrection by abolishing serfdom in Poland in 1864, thus depriving Polish gentry and political leaders from their workforce and freeing the peasants from feudal obligation.

The aftermath of the January Uprising was severe; the Russian authorities imposed harsh reprisals including executions, mass deportations to Siberia, and confiscation of property. The remaining autonomy of the Kingdom of Poland was abolished, and the official use of the Polish language was restricted. Although the uprising failed militarily, it became a symbol of continuous resistance and shaped future independence movements. The ensuing breakup of estates and destitution of many peasants also convinced the population to turn to "organic work" and self-improvement, laying the foundations for modern social and economic development.

== Background ==
During the previous November Uprising, insurgents adopted white and red tinctures (colours) for the national cockade of Poland. The cockade was subsequently worn by Polish insurgents during the January Uprising.

Despite the Russian Empire's loss of the Crimean War and weakened economic and political state, Alexander II warned in 1856 against further concessions with the words "forget any dreams". There were two prevailing streams of thought among the population of the Kingdom of Poland. One had patriotic stirrings within liberal-conservative, usually land-owning, and intellectual circles, was centered around Andrzej Zamoyski, and hoped for an orderly return to the constitutional status before 1830; they became characterized as the Whites. The alternative tendency, characterized as the Reds, represented a democratic movement uniting peasants, workers and some clergy. Both streams considered the peasant question central to their movement. However, estate owners tended to favour the abolition of serfdom in exchange for compensation, but the democratic movement saw the overthrow of the Russian yoke as entirely dependent on an unconditional liberation of the peasantry.

Just as the democrats organized the first religious and patriotic demonstrations in 1860, covert resistance groups began to form among educated youth. Blood was first to shed in Warsaw in February 1861, when the Russian Army attacked a demonstration in Castle Square on the anniversary of the Battle of Grochów. There were five fatalities. Fearing the spread of spontaneous unrest, Alexander II reluctantly agreed to accept a petition for a change in the system of governance. Ultimately, he agreed to the appointment of Aleksander Wielopolski to head a commission to look into Religious Observance and Public Education and announced the formation of a State Council and self-governance for towns and powiats. The concessions did not prevent further demonstrations. On 8 April, there were 200 killed and 500 wounded by Russian fire. Martial law was imposed in Warsaw, and brutal repressive measures were taken against the organisers in Warsaw and Vilna by deporting them deep into Russia.

In Vilna alone, 116 demonstrations were held in 1861. That autumn, Russians had introduced a state of emergency in Vilna Governorate, Kovno Governorate and Grodno Governorate.

The repressions led to a speedier consolidation of the resistance. Future leaders of the uprising gathered secretly in St. Petersburg, Warsaw, Vilna, Paris and London. Two bodies emerged from those consultations. By October 1861, the urban "Movement Committee" (Komitet Ruchu Miejski) had been formed, followed in June 1862, by the Central National Committee (CNC). Its leadership included Stefan Bobrowski, Jarosław Dąbrowski, Zygmunt Padlewski, Agaton Giller and Bronisław Szwarce. The body directed the creation of national structures that were intended to become a new secret Polish state. The CNC had not planned an uprising before the spring of 1863 at the earliest. However, Wielopolski's move to start conscription to the Russian Army in mid-January forced its hand to call the uprising prematurely on the night of 22–23 January 1863.

== Call to arms in the Kingdom of Poland ==
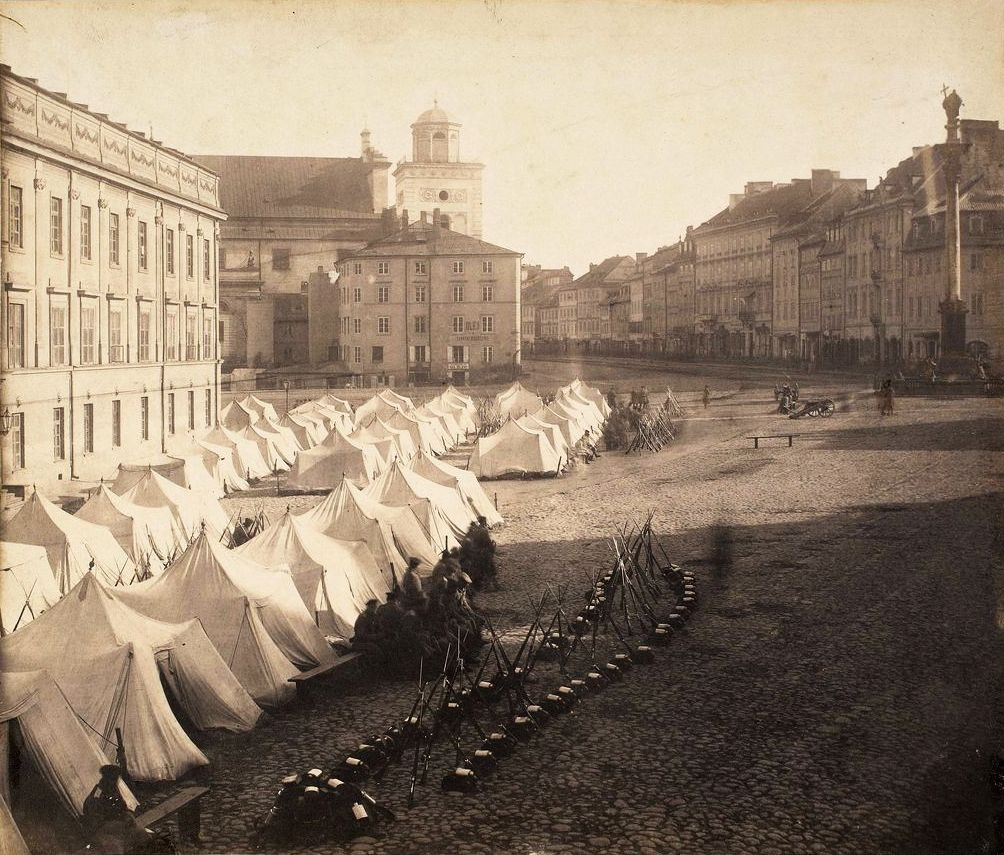
Russian army at Warsaw's Castle Square during martial law, 1861

The uprising broke out at a moment when general peace prevailed in Europe, and although there was vocal support for the Poles, powers such as France, Britain and Austria were unwilling to disturb the international calm. The revolutionary leaders did not have sufficient means to arm and equip the groups of young men hiding in forests to escape Wielopolski's order of conscription into the Russian Army. Initially, about 10,000 men rallied around the revolutionary banner. The volunteers were mostly workers in cities and minor clerks, but there was also a significant number of the younger sons of the poorer szlachta (nobility) and a number of priests of lower rank. Initially, the Russian government had at its disposal an army of 90,000 men, under Russian General Anders Edvard Ramsay, in Poland.

It looked as if the rebellion might be crushed quickly. Undeterred, the CNC's provisional government issued a manifesto in which it declared "all sons of Poland are free and equal citizens without distinction of creed, condition or rank". It decreed that land cultivated by the peasants, whether on the basis of rent or service, should become their unconditional property, and compensation for it would be given to the landlords out of State general funds. The provisional government did its best to send supplies to the unarmed and scattered volunteers, who, in February, had fought in eighty bloody skirmishes with the Russians. Meanwhile, the CNC issued an appeal for assistance to the nations of Western Europe that was received everywhere with supportive sentiments from Norway to Portugal. The Confederate States of America sympathized with the Polish-Lithuanian rebels and viewed their struggles analogous. Italian, French and Hungarian officers answered the call. Pope Pius IX was against the 1863 uprising of which he informed Władysław Czartoryski. The historian Jerzy Zdrada records that by the late spring and the early summer of 1863, there were 35,000 Poles under arms facing a Russian Army of 145,000 in the Polish Kingdom.

== Uprising spreads to Lithuania ==
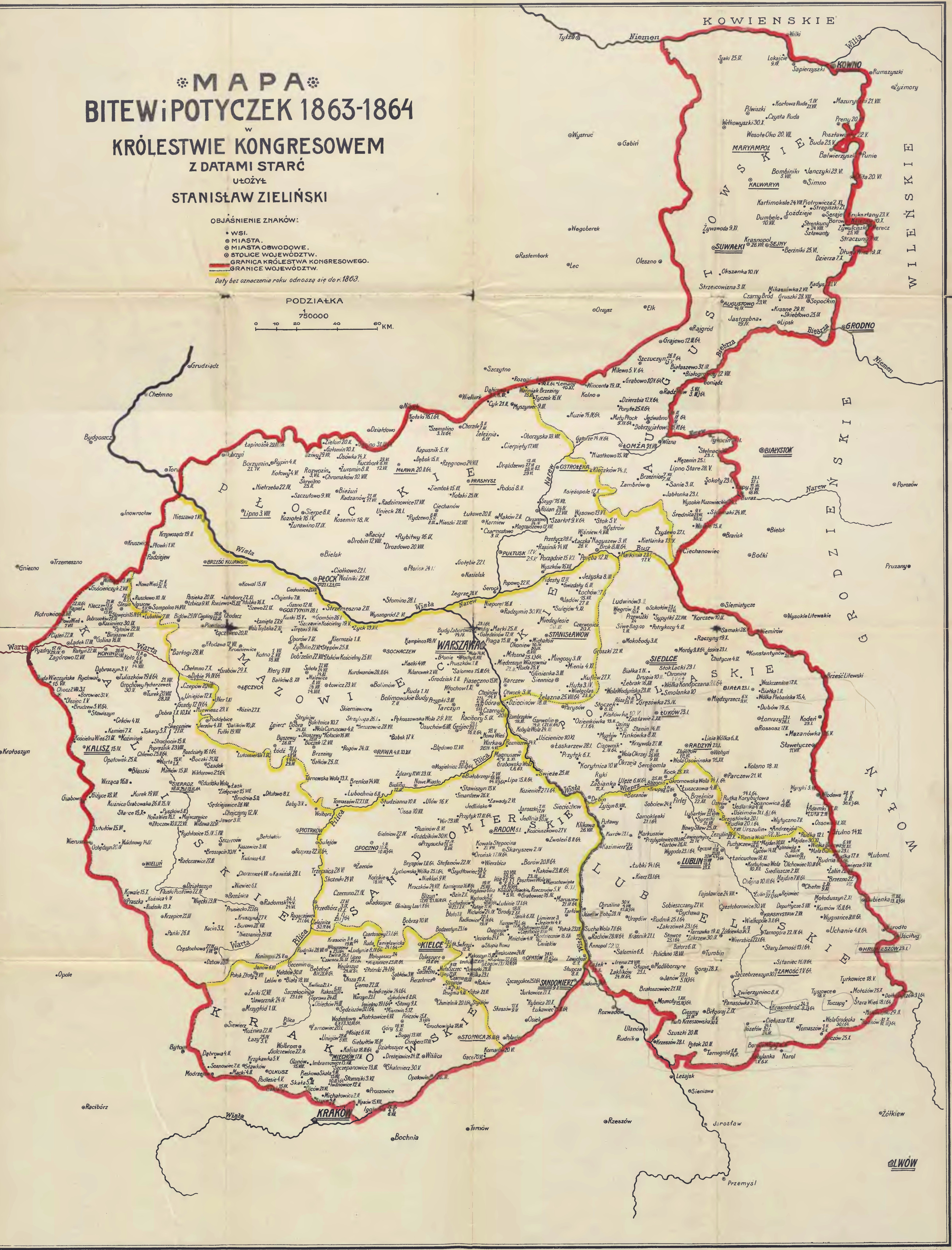
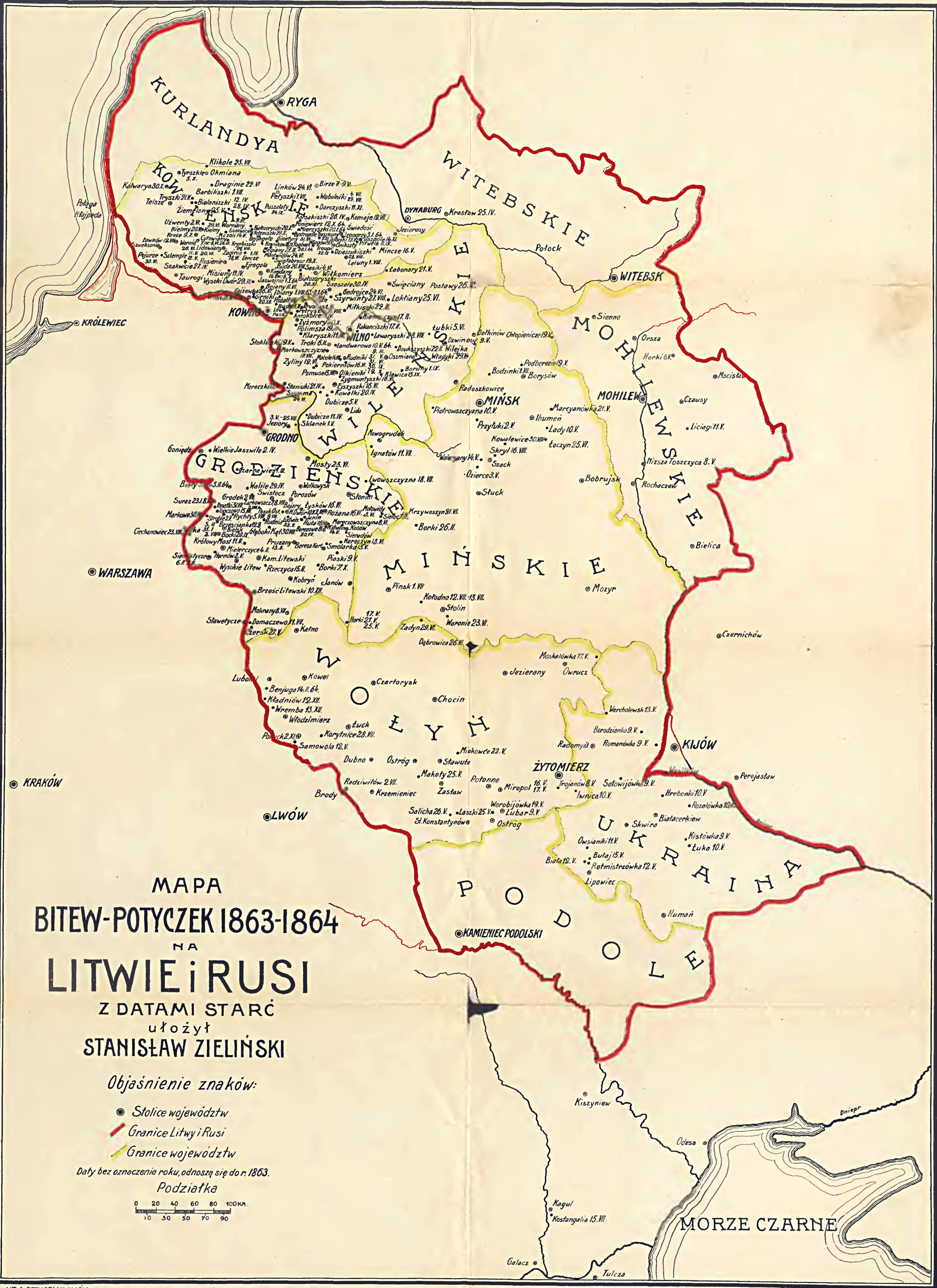
Battles of January Uprising in Congress Poland (left) and Lithuania, Latvia, Belarus and Ukraine (right)

On 1 February 1863, the uprising erupted in the former Grand Duchy of Lithuania. In April and May, it had spread to Dinaburg, Latvia and Witebsk, Belarus, to the Kiev Governorate, northern Ukraine, and to the Wolynian Voivodship. Volunteers, weapons and supplies began to flow in over the borders from Galicia, in the Austrian Partition, and from the Prussian Partition. Volunteers also arrived from Italy, Hungary, France and Russia itself. The greatest setback was that in spite of the liberation manifesto from the KCN, without prior ideological agitation, the peasantry could not be mobilized to participate in the struggle except in those regions that were dominated by Polish units, which saw a gradual enrollment into the uprising of agricultural workers.

=== Secret State ===
The secret Polish state was directed by the Rada Narodowa (RN, National Council) to which the civil and military structures on the ground were accountable. It was a "virtual coalition government" formed of the Reds and the Whites and was led by Zygmunt Sierakowski, Antanas Mackevičius and Konstanty Kalinowski. The latter two supported their counterparts in Poland and adhered to common policies.

Its diplomatic corps was centered on Paris under the direction of Władysław Czartoryski. The eruption of armed conflict in the former Commonwealth of Two Nations had surprised western European capitals, even if public opinion responded with sympathy for the rebel cause. It had dawned on Paris, London, Vienna and Saint Petersburg that the crisis could plausibly turn into an international war. For their part, Russian diplomats considered the uprising an internal matter, and European stability was generally predicated on the fate of Poland's aspiration.

=== International repercussions ===
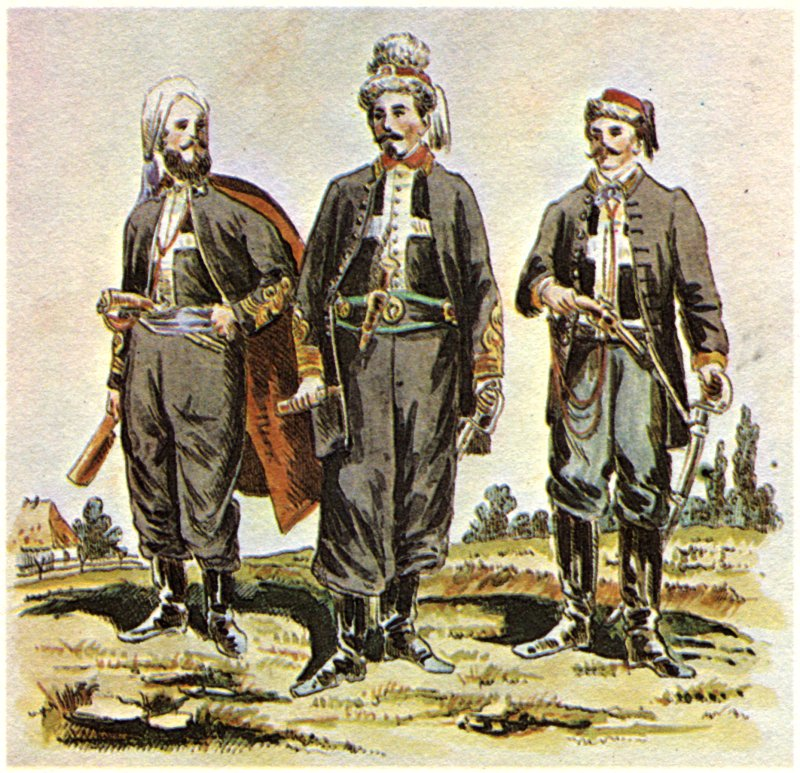
Zouaves of Death (żuawi śmierci), an 1863 Uprising unit organized by François Rochebrune. From left: Count Wojciech Komorowski, Colonel Rochebrune, and Lieutenant Tenente Bella

The uncovering of the existence of the Alvensleben Convention, signed on 8 February 1863 by Prussia and Russia in St. Petersburg, to suppress the Poles jointly, internationalized the uprising. It enabled Western powers to take the diplomatic initiative for their own ends. Napoleon III of France, already a sympathizer with Poland, was concerned to protect his border on the Rhine and turned his political guns on Prussia with a view to provoking a war with it. He was simultaneously seeking an alliance with Austria. The United Kingdom, on the other hand, sought to prevent a Franco-Prussian war and to block an Austrian alliance with France and so looked to scupper any rapprochement between France and Russia. Austria was competing with Prussia for the leadership of the German territories but rejected French approaches for an alliance and spurned any support of Napoleon III as acting against German interests. There was no discussion of military intervention on behalf of the Poles, despite Napoleon's support for the continuation of the insurgency. France, the United Kingdom and Austria agreed to a diplomatic intervention in defense of Polish rights and in April issued diplomatic notes that were intended to be no more than persuasive in tone. The Polish RN hoped that the evolution of the insurgency would ultimately push western powers to adopt an armed intervention, which was the aim of Polish diplomatic talks with those powers. The Polish line was that the establishment of continued peace in Europe was conditional on the return of an independent Polish state.

With the threat of war averted, St. Petersburg left the door open for negotiations but was adamant in its rejection of any western rights to armed conflict. In June 1863, western powers iterated the conditions: an amnesty for the insurgents, the creation of a national representative structure, the development of autonomous concessions across the Kingdom, a recall of a conference of Congress of Vienna (1815) signatories and a ceasefire for its duration. That fell well below the expectations of the leadership of the uprising. While concerned by the threat of war, Alexander II felt secure enough with the support of his people to reject the proposals. Although France and Britain were insulted, they did not proceed with further interventions, which enabled Russia to extend and finally to break off negotiations in September 1863.

== Outcome on the ground ==
Coat of arms of the Polish National Government, visually alluding to a potential Polish–Lithuanian–Ruthenian Commonwealth. The arms combine the Polish White Eagle, the Lithuanian Vytis, and the Ruthenian representation of Archangel Michael.

Apart from the efforts of Sweden, diplomatic intervention by foreign powers on behalf of Poland was on the balance unhelpful in drawing attention away from the aim of Polish national unity towards its social divisions. It alienated Austria, which had maintained friendly neutrality towards Poland and not interfered with Polish activities in Galicia. It prejudiced public opinion among radical groups in Russia that until then had been friendly because they regarded the uprising as a social, rather than a national, insurgency. It also stirred the Russian government to ever more brutal suppression of hostilities and repression against its Polish participants, who had grown in strength.

In addition to the thousands who fell in battle, 128 men were hanged under the personal supervision of Mikhail Muravyov 'Muravyov the Hangman', and 9,423 men and women were exiled to Siberia, 2,500 men according to Russia's own estimates. The historian Norman Davies gives the number as 80,000 and noted it was the single largest deportation in Russian history. Whole villages and towns were burned down. All economic and social activities were suspended, and the szlachta was ruined through the confiscation of property and exorbitant taxes. Such was the brutality of Russian troops that their actions were condemned throughout Europe. Count Fyodor Berg, the newly appointed governor, Namiestnik of Poland, and the successor to Muravyov, employed harsh measures against the population and intensified systematic Russification in an effort to eradicate Polish traditions and culture.

=== Social and ethnic divisions ===
Insurgents of landed background constituted 60% of the uprising's participants (in Lithuania and Belarus around 50%, in Ukraine some 75%). Records indicate that 95% of those punished for participation in the uprising were Catholic, which corresponded to the general proportion of participants.

Despite outreach to Rus (Ruthenian) peasants by the Polish gentry (szlachta), comparatively few partook in the January Uprising. In some cases they assisted the Russian forces in catching rebels. This has been cited as one of the primary reasons for the failure of the uprising.

== Evolution of events ==
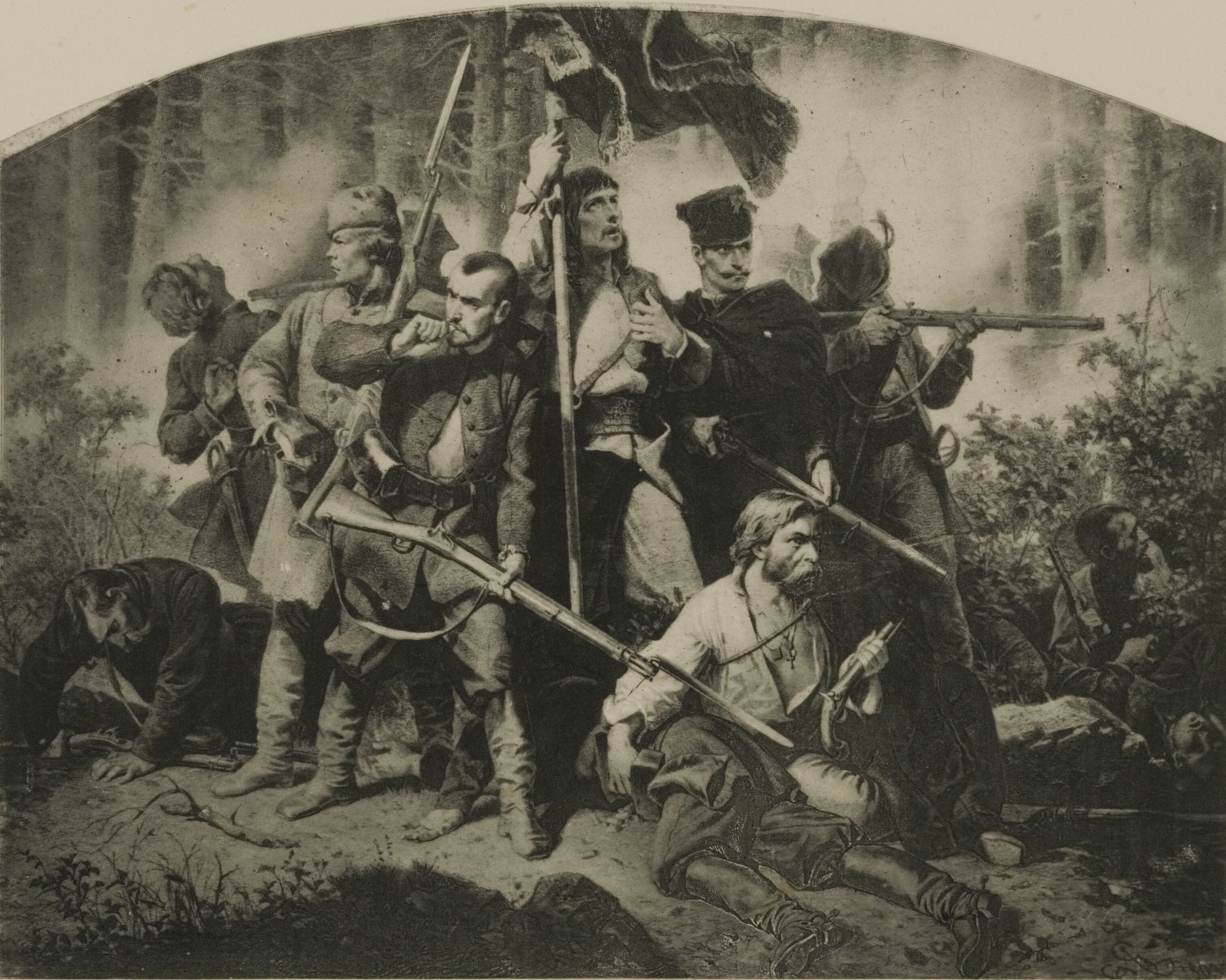
"The Battle" from the cycle of paintings "Polonia" dedicated to January Uprising of 1863 – Artur Grottger.

During the first 24 hours of the uprising, armouries across the country were looted, and many Russian officials were executed on sight. On 2 February 1863, was the start of the first major military engagement of the uprising between Lithuanian peasants armed mostly with scythes and a squadron of Russian hussars outside Čysta Būda, near Marijampolė. It ended with the massacre of the unprepared peasants. While there was still hope of a short war, insurgent groups merged into larger formations and recruited new volunteers.

The provisional government had counted on an insurgency erupting in Russia, where wide discontent with the autocratic regime then seemed to be brewing. It also counted on the active support of Napoleon III, particularly after Prussia, expecting the inevitable armed conflict with France, had made overtures to Russia sealed in the Alvensleben Convention and offered assistance in suppressing the Polish uprising. Arrangements had already been completed on 14 February and the British Ambassador to Berlin, Sir Alexander Malet, informed his government that a Prussian military envoy

has concluded a military convention with the Russian Government, according to which the two governments will reciprocally afford facilities to each other for the suppression of the insurrectionary movements which have lately taken place in Poland and Lithuania. The Prussian railways are also to be placed at the disposal of the Russian military authorities for the transportation of troops through Prussian territory from one part of the former Polish-Lithuanian commonwealth to another.

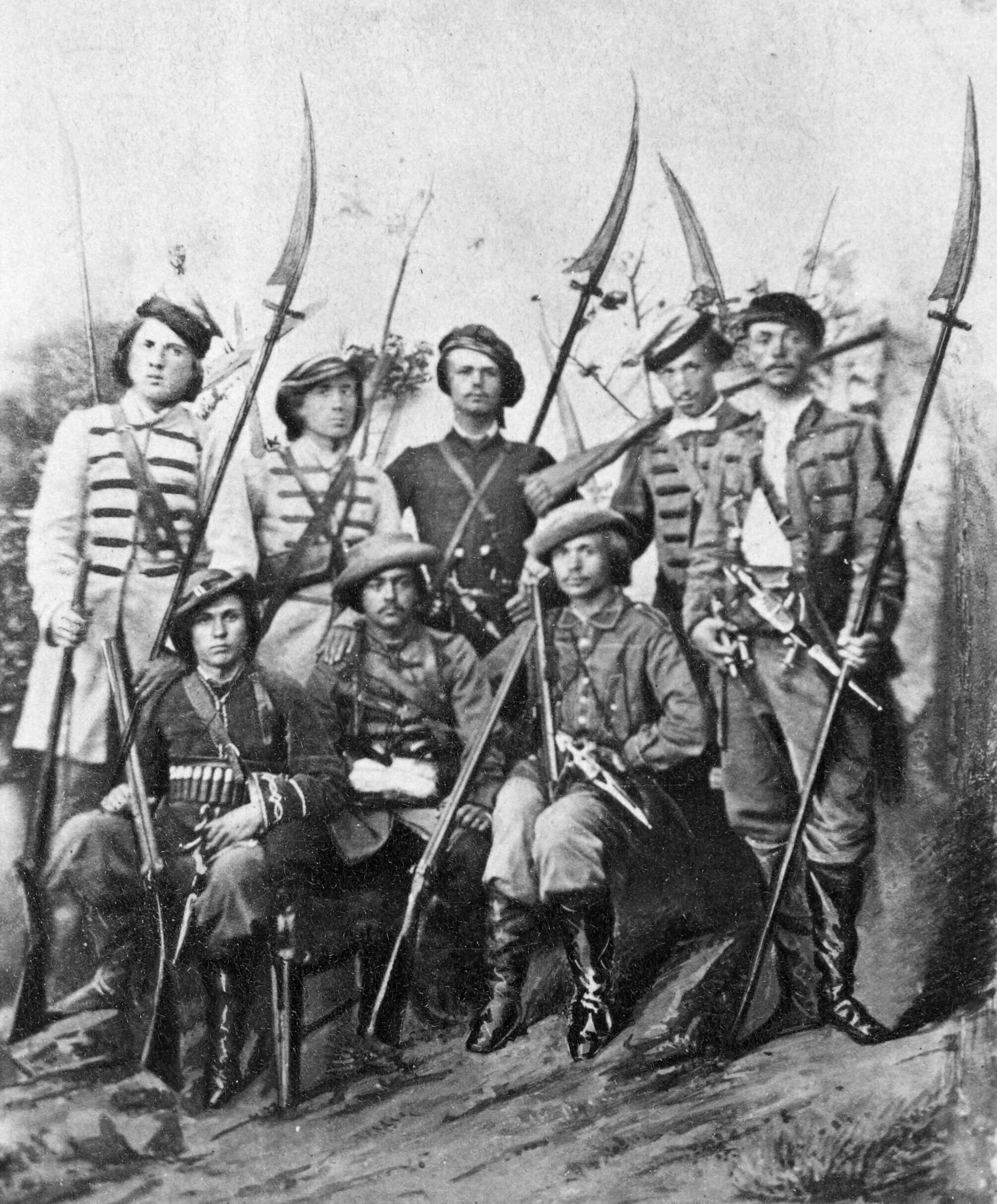
Photograph of insurgents armed with scythes and wearing rogatywka and konfederatka caps, 1863–64

That step by Otto von Bismarck led to protests from several governments and incensed the several constituent nations of the former Commonwealth. The result was the transformation of a relatively insignificant uprising into another "national war" against Russia. Encouraged by promises made by Napoleon III, all provinces of the erstwhile Commonwealth, acting on the advice of Władysław Czartoryski, had taken to arms. Moreover, to Indicate their solidarity, all Commonwealth citizens holding office under the Russian government, including the Archbishop of Warsaw, Zygmunt Feliński, resigned their positions and signed their allegiance to the newly constituted Government, which was composed of the five most prominent representatives of the Whites. The Reds, meanwhile, criticised the Polish National Government for being reactionary with its policy to incentivise Polish peasants to fight in the uprising. The government justified its inaction on the back of hopes of foreign military intervention promised by Napoleon III that never materialised.

=== Romuald Traugutt ===
It was only after Polish General Romuald Traugutt had taken matters into his own hands on 17 October 1863 to unite all classes under a single national banner that the struggle could be upheld. His restructuring in preparation for an offensive in spring 1864 was banking on a European-wide war. On 27 December 1863, he enacted a decree of the former provisional government by granting peasants the land they worked. The land was to be provided by compensating the owners through state funds after the successful conclusion of the uprising. Traugutt called upon all Polish classes to rise against Russian oppression for the creation of a new Polish state. The response was moderate since the policy came too late. The Russian government had already begun working among peasants to grant them generous parcels of land for the asking. The peasants who had been bought off did not engage with Polish revolutionaries to any extent or provide them with support.

Fighting continued intermittently during the winter of 1863–1864 on the southern edge of the Kingdom, near the Galician border, from where assistance was still forthcoming. In late December in the Lublin Voivodeship, General Michał Heydenreich's unit was overwhelmed. The most determined resistance continued in the Świętokrzyskie Mountains, where General Józef Hauke-Bosak distinguished himself by taking several cities from the vastly superior Russian forces. However, he too succumbed to a crushing defeat on 21 February 1864 which presaged the end of the armed struggle. On 29 February, Austria imposed martial law, and on 2 March, the tsarist authorities brought in the abolition of serfdom in the Polish Kingdom. Both events neutralised Traugutt's concept of developing the uprising with a general mobilisation of the population in the Russian partition and reliance on assistance from Galicia. In April 1864, Napoleon III abandoned the Polish cause. Władysław Czartoryski wrote to Traugutt: "We are alone, and alone we shall remain".

Arrests eliminated key positions in the secret Polish state, and those who felt threatened sought refuge abroad. Traugutt was taken on the night of 10 April. After he and the last four members of the National Council, Antoni Jezioranski, Rafał Krajewski, Józef Toczyski and Roman Żuliński, had been apprehended by Russian troops, they were imprisoned and executed by hanging on 5 August at the Warsaw Citadel. That marked the symbolic closure of the Uprising. Only Aleksander Waszkowski, the head of the Warsaw insurgency eluded the police till December 1864, but he too joined the list of "the lost" in February 1865. The war consisting of 650 battles and skirmishes with 25,000 Polish and other insurgents killed, had lasted 18 months. The insurgency persisted in Samogitia and Podlasie, where the Greek Catholic population, outraged and persecuted for their religious observance, "Kryaki" (those baptised into the Greek Orthodox Church), and others like the commander and priest Stanisław Brzóska, clung the longest to the revolutionary banner until the spring of 1865.

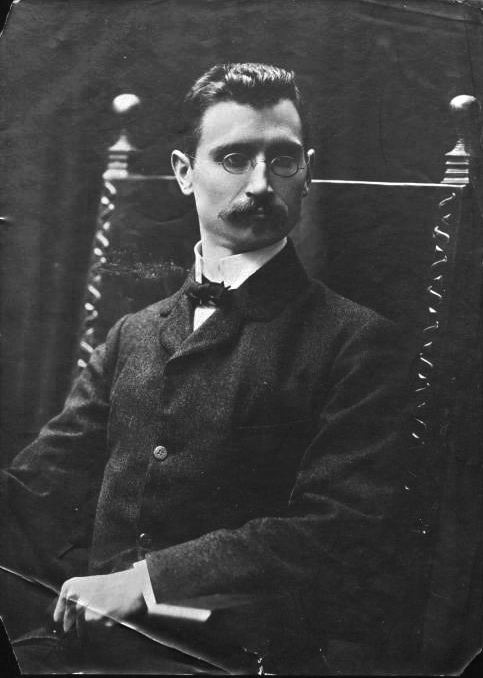
Romuald Traugutt

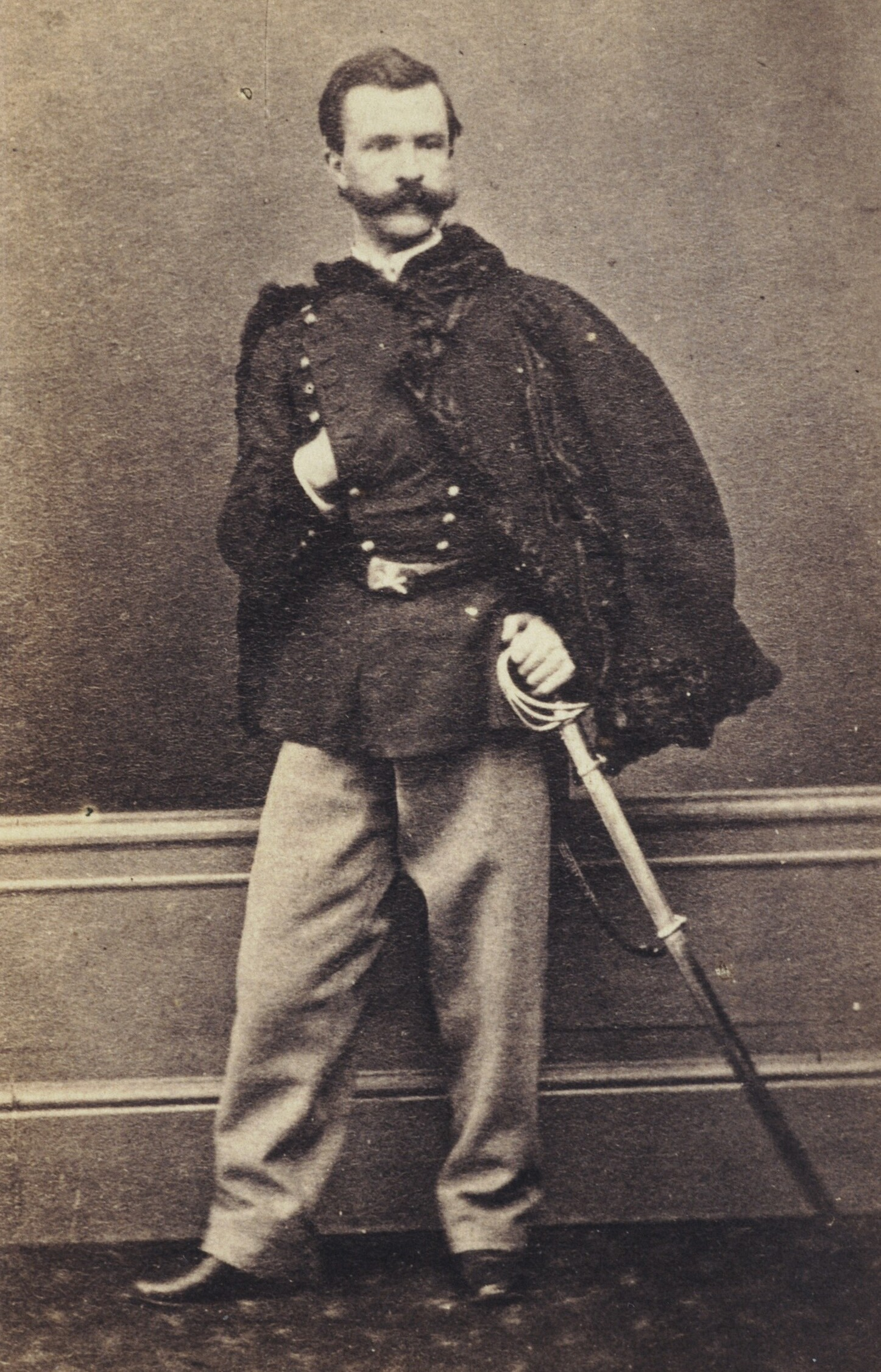
Marian Langiewicz

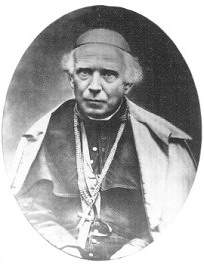
Zygmunt Feliński, Archbishop of Warsaw

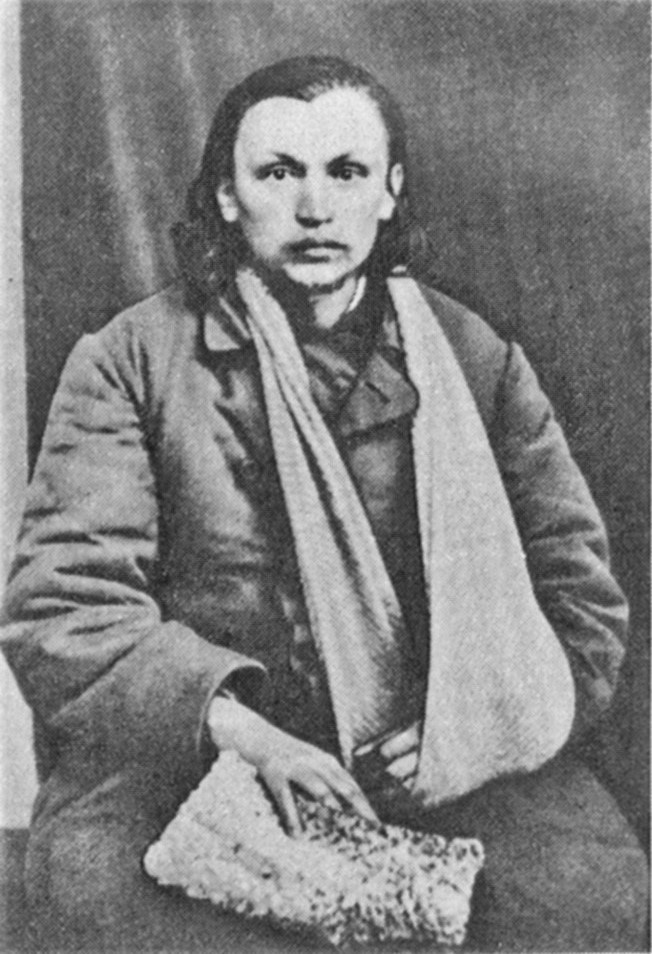
Fr. Stanisław Brzóska

== Decades of reprisals ==
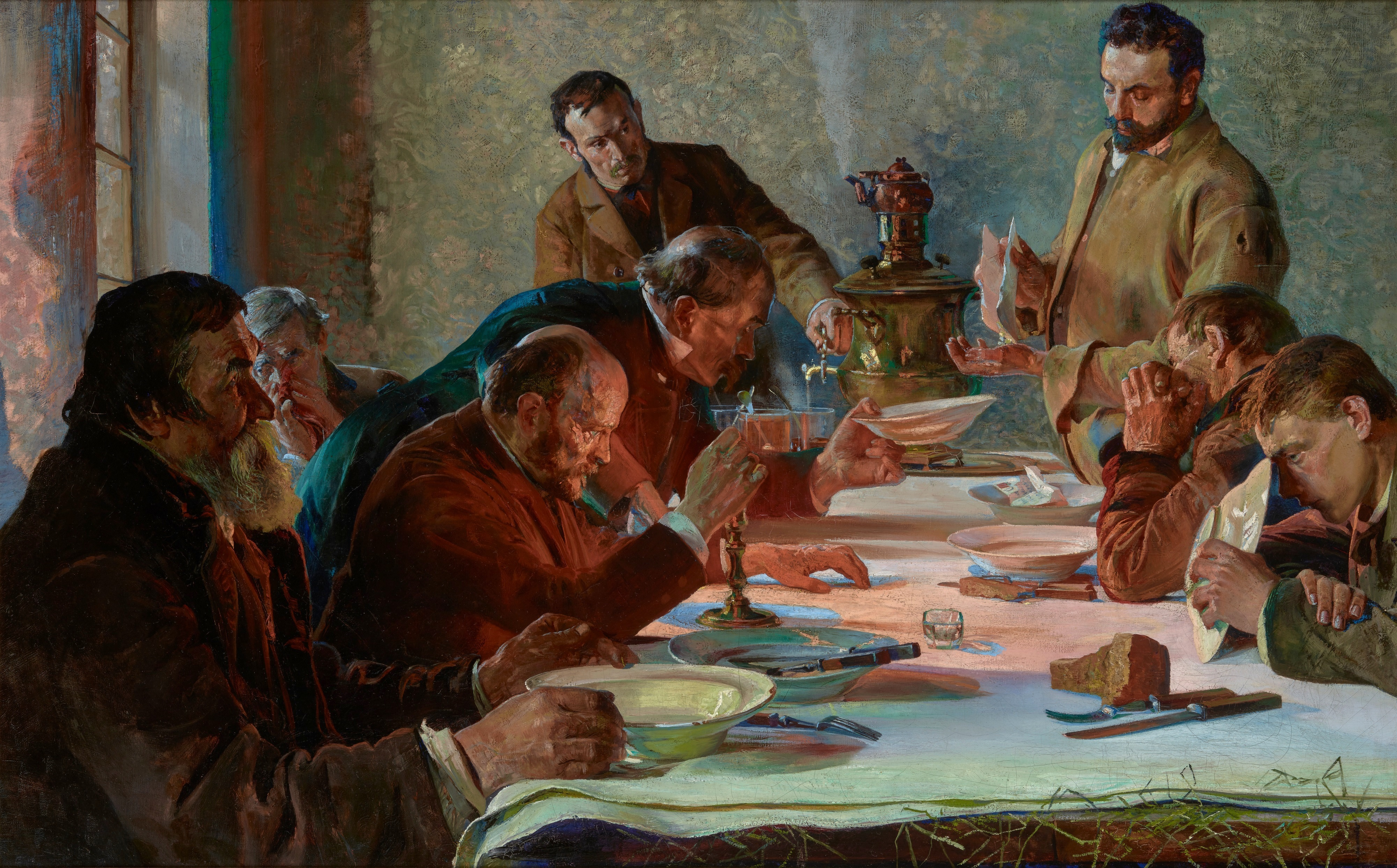
Christmas Eve in Siberia, by Jacek Malczewski

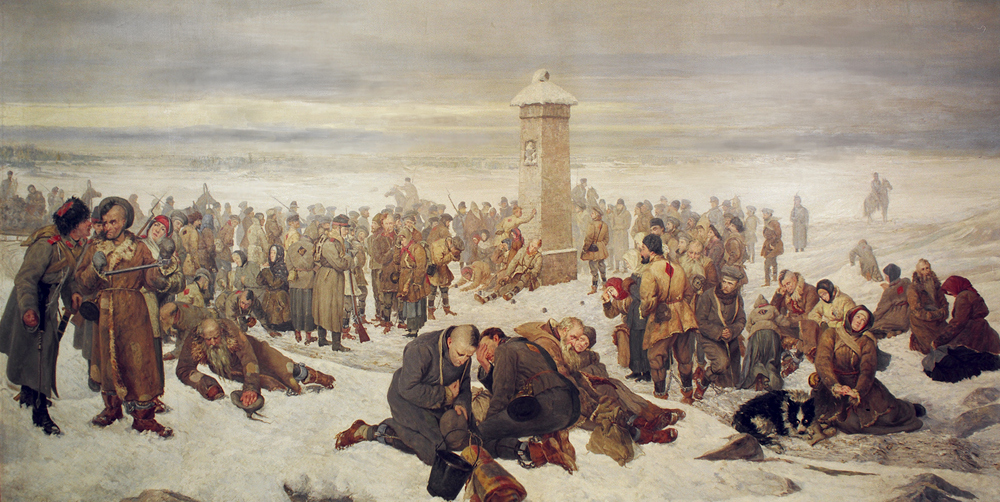
Farewell to Europe, by Aleksander Sochaczewski. The artist himself is among the exiled here, near the obelisk, on the right.

After the collapse of the uprising, harsh reprisals followed. According to official Russian information, 396 persons were executed and 18,672 were exiled to Siberia. Large numbers of men and women were sent to the interior of Russia and to the Caucasus, Urals and other remote areas. Altogether over 60,000 persons were imprisoned and subsequently exiled from Poland and consigned to distant regions of Russia.

The abolition of serfdom in early 1864 was deliberately enacted in a move designed specifically to ruin the szlachta. The Russian government confiscated 1,660 estates in Poland and 1,794 in Lithuania. A 10% income tax was imposed on all estates as a war indemnity. Only in 1869 was the tax reduced to 5% on all incomes. It was the only time that peasants paid the market price for the redemption of the land (the average for the Russian Empire was 34% above the market price). All land taken from Polish peasants since 1864 was to be returned without rights of compensation. Former serfs could sell land only to other peasants, not to szlachta. Ninety percent of the ex-serfs in the empire who actually gained land after 1861 were confined to the eight western provinces. Along with Romania, Polish landless or domestic serfs were the only people who were eligible for land grants after serfdom had been abolished.

All of that was to punish the szlachta for its role in the uprisings of 1830 and 1863. In addition to the land granted to the peasants, the Russian government gave them a forest, pasture and other privileges, known under the name of servitutes, which proved to be a source of incessant irritation between the landowners and peasants over the ensuing decades and impeded economic development. The government took over all church estates and funds and abolished monasteries and convents. With the exception of religious instruction, all teaching in schools was ordered to be in Russian. That also became the official language of the country, to be used exclusively in all offices of central and local government. All traces of former Polish autonomy were removed, and the Kingdom was divided into ten provinces, each with an appointed Russian military governor under the control of the Governor-General in Warsaw. All former Polish government functionaries were deprived of their positions and replaced by Russian officials. According to George Kennan, "thousands of Polish insurgents" were transported to the "Nerchinsk silver-mining district... after the unsuccessful insurrection of 1863".

== Legacy ==
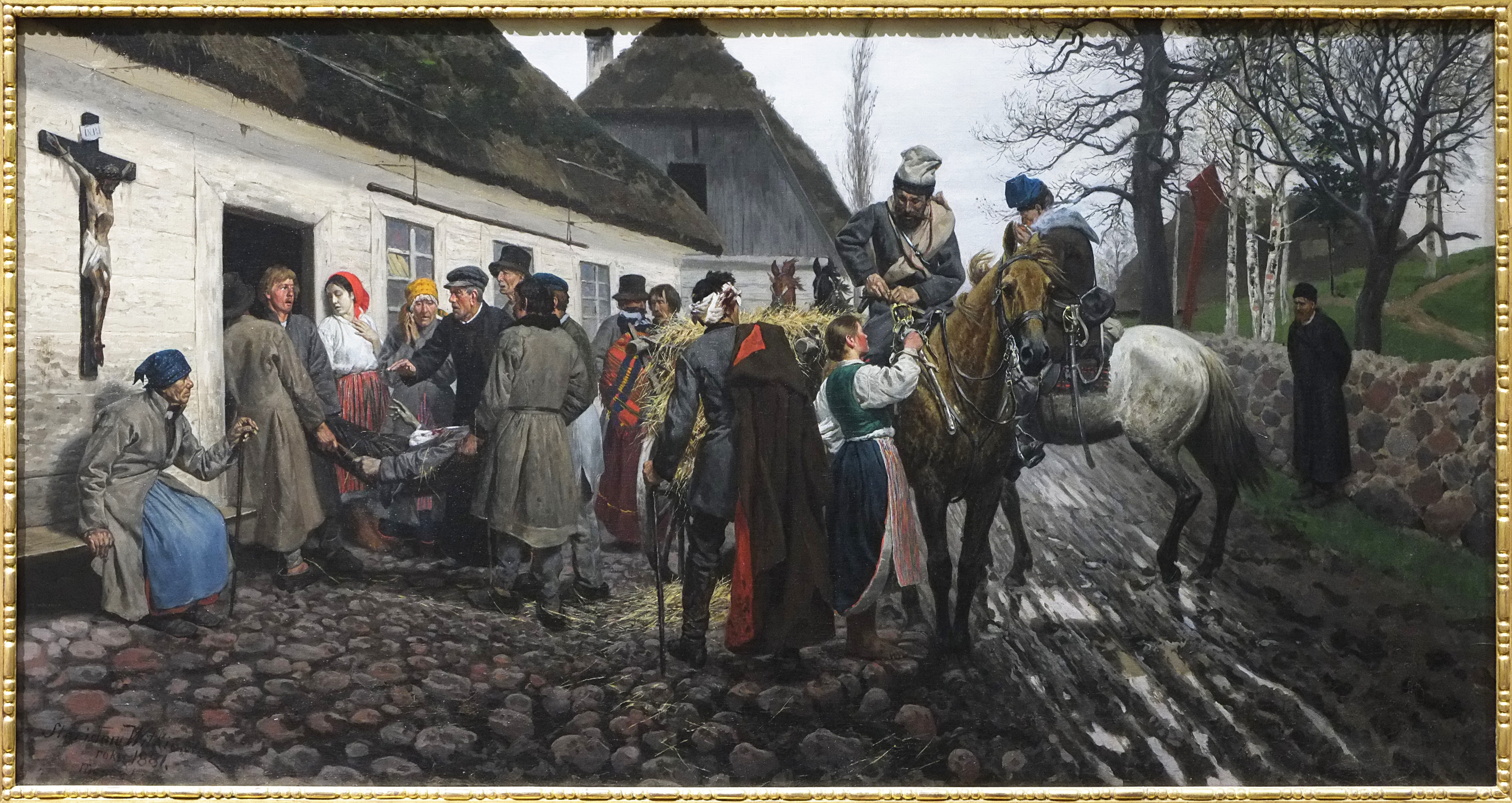
Wounded insurgent, by Stanisław Witkiewicz, 1881

These measures of cultural eradication proved to be only partially effective. In 1905, 41 years after Russia crushed the uprising, the next generation of Poles rose once again in the Łódź insurrection, which too failed.

The January Uprising was one in a centuries-long series of Polish uprisings. In its aftermath, two new movements began to evolve that set the political agenda for the next century. One, led by the descendant of Lithuanians, Józef Piłsudski emerged as the Polish Socialist Party. The other, led by Roman Dmowski, became the National Democracy movement; sometimes referred to as Endecja, its roots lay in Catholic conservatism that sought national sovereignty, along with the reversal of forced Russification and Germanisation by the Polonisation of the partitioned territories in the former Commonwealth.

== Notable insurgents ==
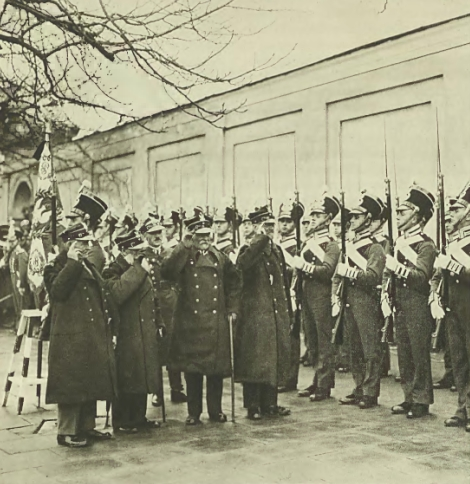
Last veterans of the January Uprising, photographed in the Second Polish Republic, c. 1930

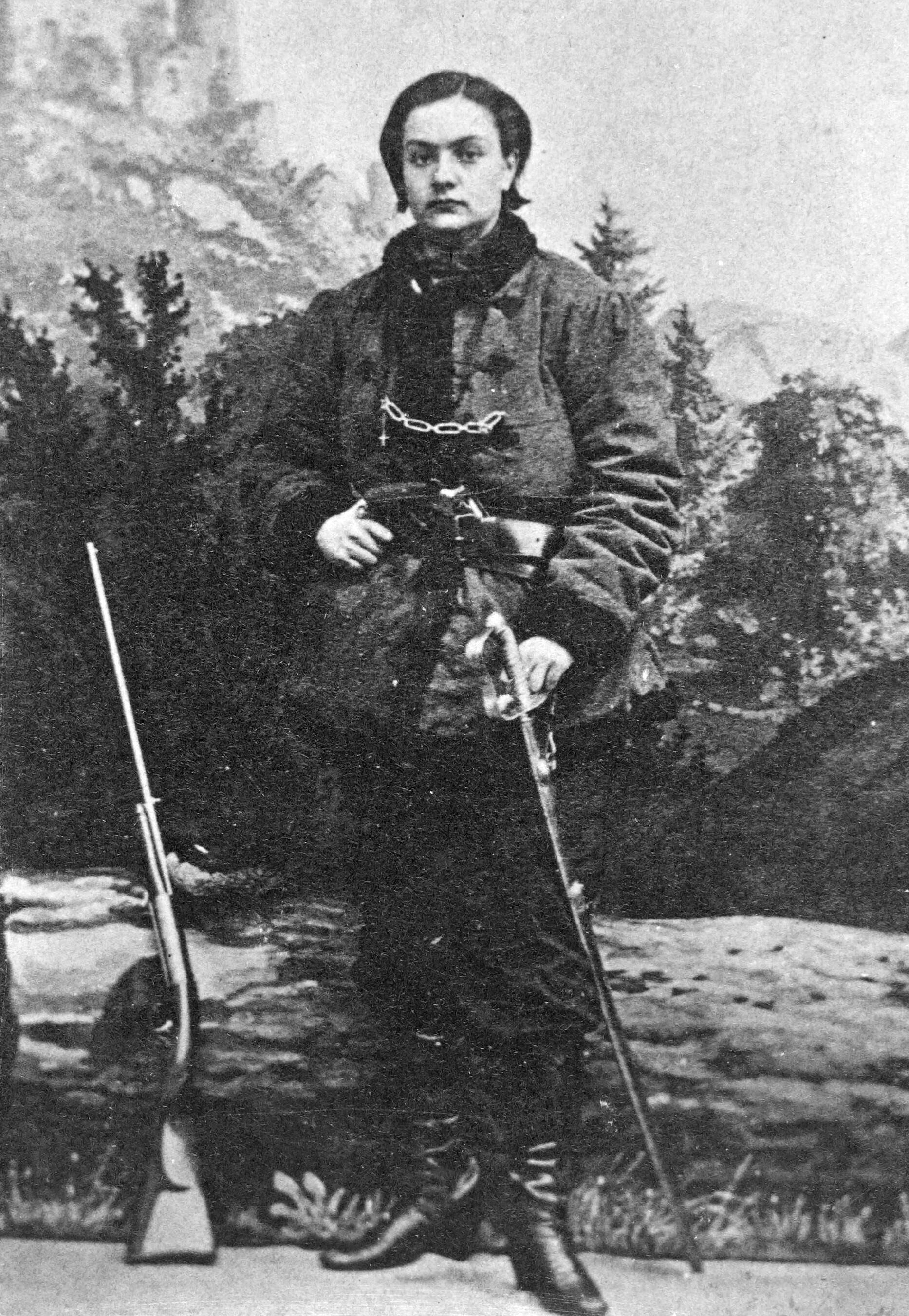
Anna Pustowojtówna, alias "Michał Smok"

- Francišak Bahuševič (1840–1900), Belarusian poet and writer, one of the founders of modern Belarusian literature
- Stanisław Brzóska (1832–1865), Polish priest and commander at the end of the insurrection.
- Saint Albert Chmielowski (1845–1916), founder of the Albertine Brothers and Sisters.
- Jarosław Dąbrowski (1836–1871), officer in the Russian Army, left-wing member of the "secret committee" of officers in St. Petersburg. He took over its leadership from Sierakowski. He died in Paris fighting for the Paris Commune.
- Maria Hempel (1834–1904), a member of the Chełm Women's Committee who supplied and helped hide insurgents during the uprising. Went on to become a noted ethnobotanist.
- Emilia Heurich (1819–1905), keeper of documents and seals of the Polish National Government
- Wincenty Kalinowski (also known as Kastus) (1838–1864), was one of the leaders of Lithuanian national revival, a founder of Belarusian nationalism, and the leader of the January Uprising in the lands of the former Grand Duchy of Lithuania.
- Saint Raphael Kalinowski (1835–1907), born Joseph Kalinowski in Lithuania, resigned as a Captain from the Russian Army to become Minister of War for the Polish insurgents. He was arrested and sentenced to death by firing squad, but the sentence was then changed to 10 years in Siberia, including a grueling nine-month overland trek to get there.
- Apollo Korzeniowski (1820–1869), Polish playwright and father of Joseph Conrad.
- Marian Langiewicz (1827–1887), Military Commander of the uprising. He had an English wife, Suzanne, next to whom he was buried in Istanbul.
- Antanas Mackevičius (1828–1863), Lithuanian priest who organized some two hundred and fifty men, armed with hunting rifles and straightened scythes. After a defeat near Vilkija, he was captured and taken to the prison in Kaunas. After Mackevičius refused to betray other leaders of the uprising, he was hanged on 28 December 1863.
- Edmund Matejko (1829–1907), teacher, older brother of the painter Jan Matejko
- Ludwik Mierosławski (1814–1878), veteran of the November Uprising and of the Greater Poland uprising (1846), general, strategist, writer and emigrant with wide foreign contacts.
- Władysław Niegolewski (1819–1885), was a liberal Polish politician and member of parliament, an insurgent in the Greater Poland Uprising of 1846 and 1848 and of the January 1863 Uprising, and a co-founder (1861) of the Central Economic Society and (1880) the People's Libraries Society.
- Francesco Nullo (1826–1863), Italian general who headed the Garibaldi Legion, and that carried huge symbolic value. Nullo died at the Battle of Krzykawka.
- Andriy Potebnia (1838–1863), revolutionary and former officer of the Russian Imperial Army of Ukrainian ethnicity.
- Bolesław Prus (1847–1912), leading Polish writer of historical novels.
- Anna Henryka Pustowójtówna (1838–1881), alias "Michał Smok", adjutant to Marian Langiewicz. She was of Russian-Polish descent and an activist from 1861. She later took part in the Paris Commune and the Franco-Prussian War. Having had four children, she later died in Paris.
- François Rochebrune, (1830–1870), one of several French officers in the Uprising, he formed and led a Polish rebel unit called the Zouaves of Death and was promoted to General.
- Leon Przanowski (1844–1924), a member of the National Government who held the equivalent office to Adjutant General during the January Uprising. He served under General Dionizy Czachowski.
- Aleksander Sochaczewski (1843–1923), Polish painter.
- Romuald Traugutt (1826–1864), a Lieutenant colonel of German descent in the Russian Army, he was promoted general in the insurrection, was its leader for a spell and held the Foreign Affairs portfolio in the underground government. He was tortured and hanged by the Russians with several of his colleagues.

== Influence on art and literature ==
Falling into the late romantic period, the events and figures of the uprising inspired many Polish painters, including Artur Grottger, Juliusz Kossak and Michał Elwiro Andriolli, and marked the delineation with the positivism that followed.

- The Polish poet Cyprian Norwid wrote a famous poem, "Chopin's Piano," describing the defenestration of the composer's piano during the January 1863 Uprising, when Russian soldiers maliciously threw the instrument out of a second-floor Warsaw apartment. Chopin had left Warsaw and Poland forever shortly before the outbreak of the November 1830 Uprising.
- Eliza Orzeszkowa, a leading Polish positivist writer and nominee for the Nobel Prize in Literature wrote Nad Niemnem a novel set in and around the city of Grodno after the 1863 January Uprising.
- Józef Jarzębowski has put together material from unknown people who lived through the uprising in his Mówią Ludzie Roku 1863: Antologia nieznanych i małoznanych Głosów Ludzi współczesnych. London: Veritas, 1963. ("Voices from 1863: An Anthology of unknown and little known contemporary Perspectives").
- In the initial draft of Twenty Thousand Leagues Under the Seas by Jules Verne but not in the published version, Captain Nemo was a Polish nobleman whose family had been brutally murdered by the Russians during the January 1863 Uprising. Since France had only recently signed an alliance with the Russian Empire, for the novel's final version, Verne's editor, Pierre-Jules Hetzel, made him obscure Nemo's motives.
- In Guy de Maupassant's novel Pierre et Jean, the protagonist Pierre has a friend, an old Polish chemist who is said to have come to France after the bloody events in his motherland. The story is believed to refer to the January Uprising.

== Gallery ==
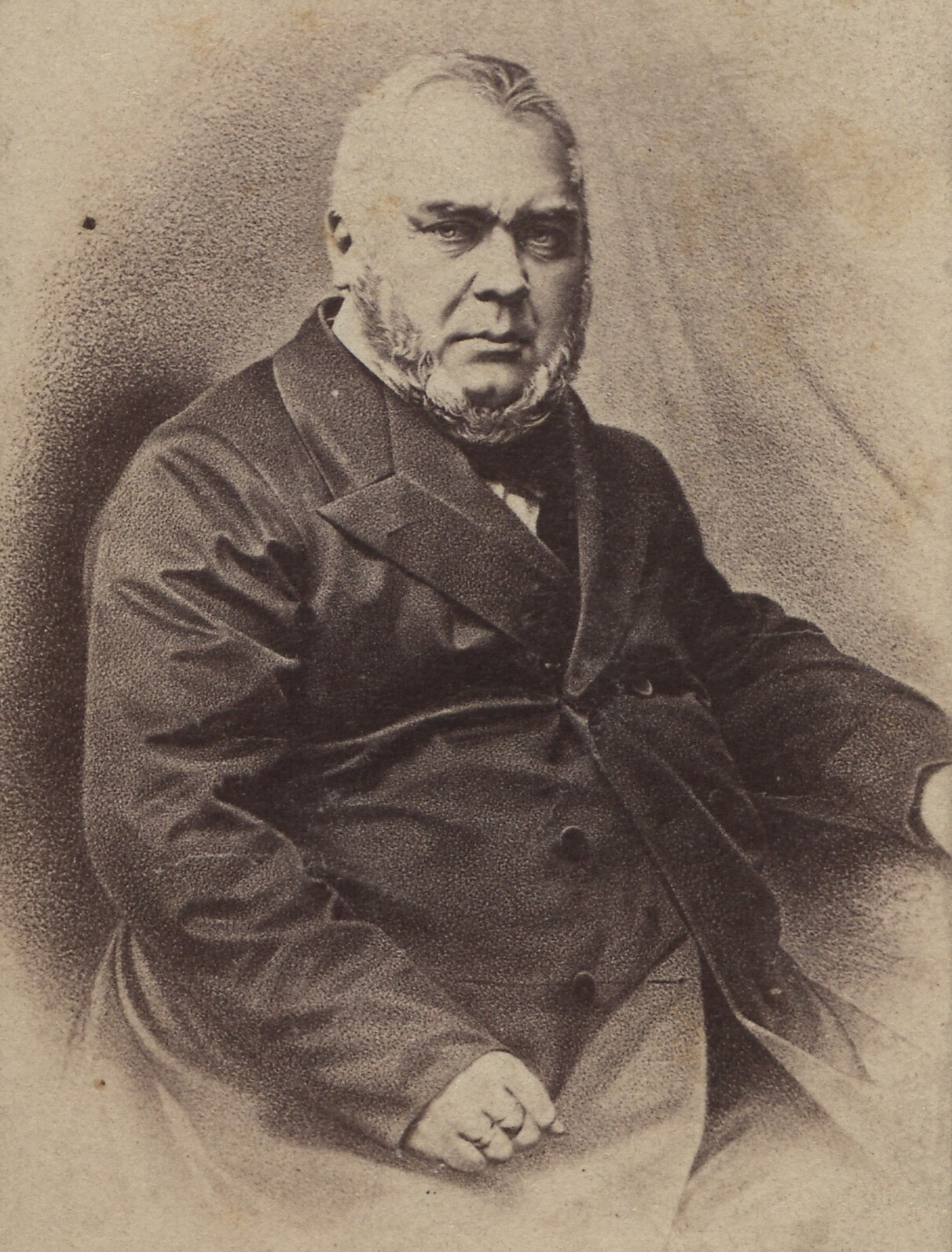
Aleksander Wielopolski

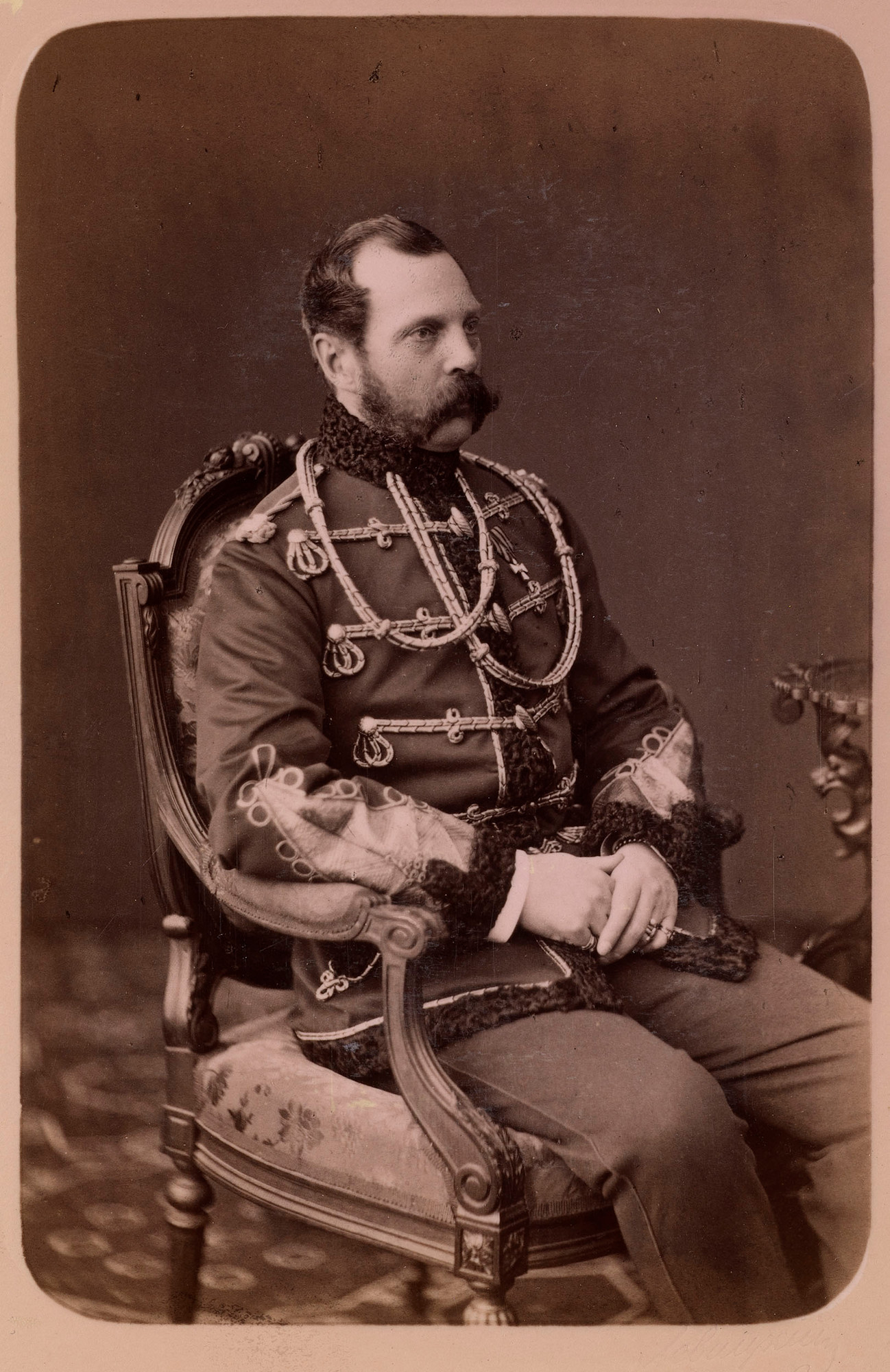
Alexander II of Russia

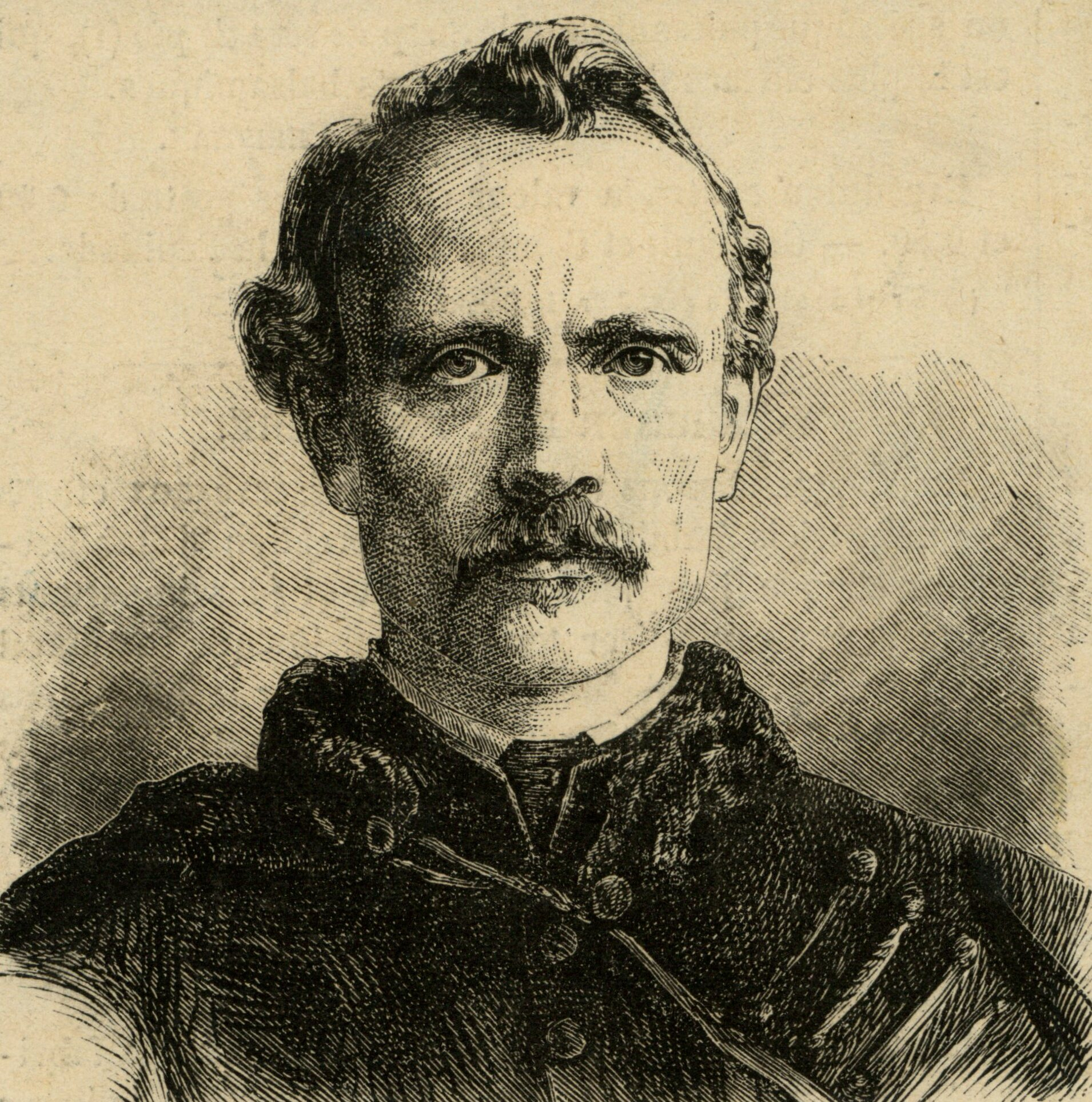
Z. Sierakowski 1863

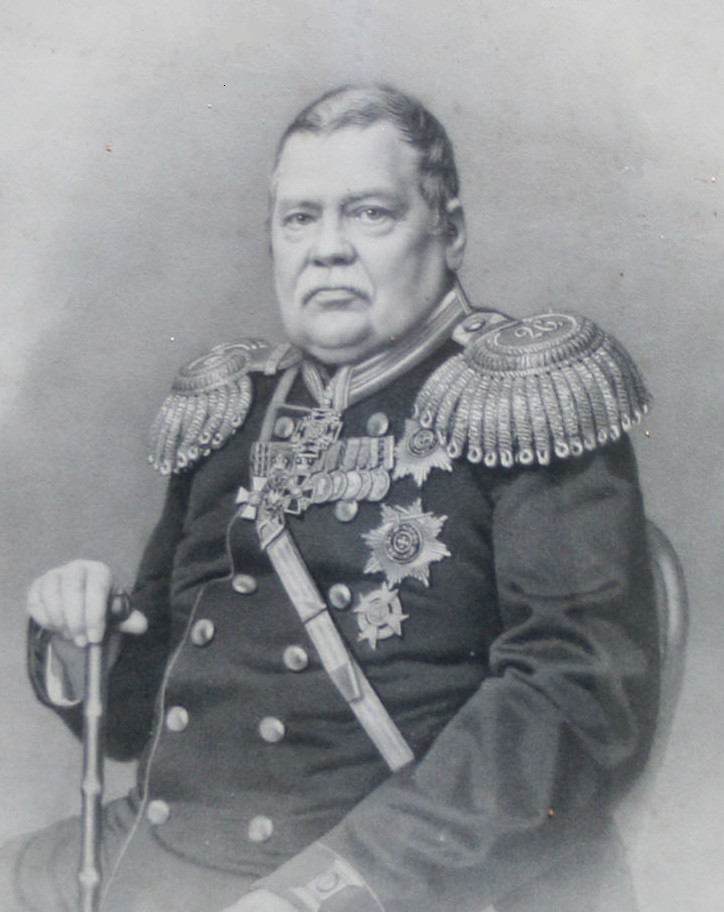
Mikhail Muravyov-Vilensky

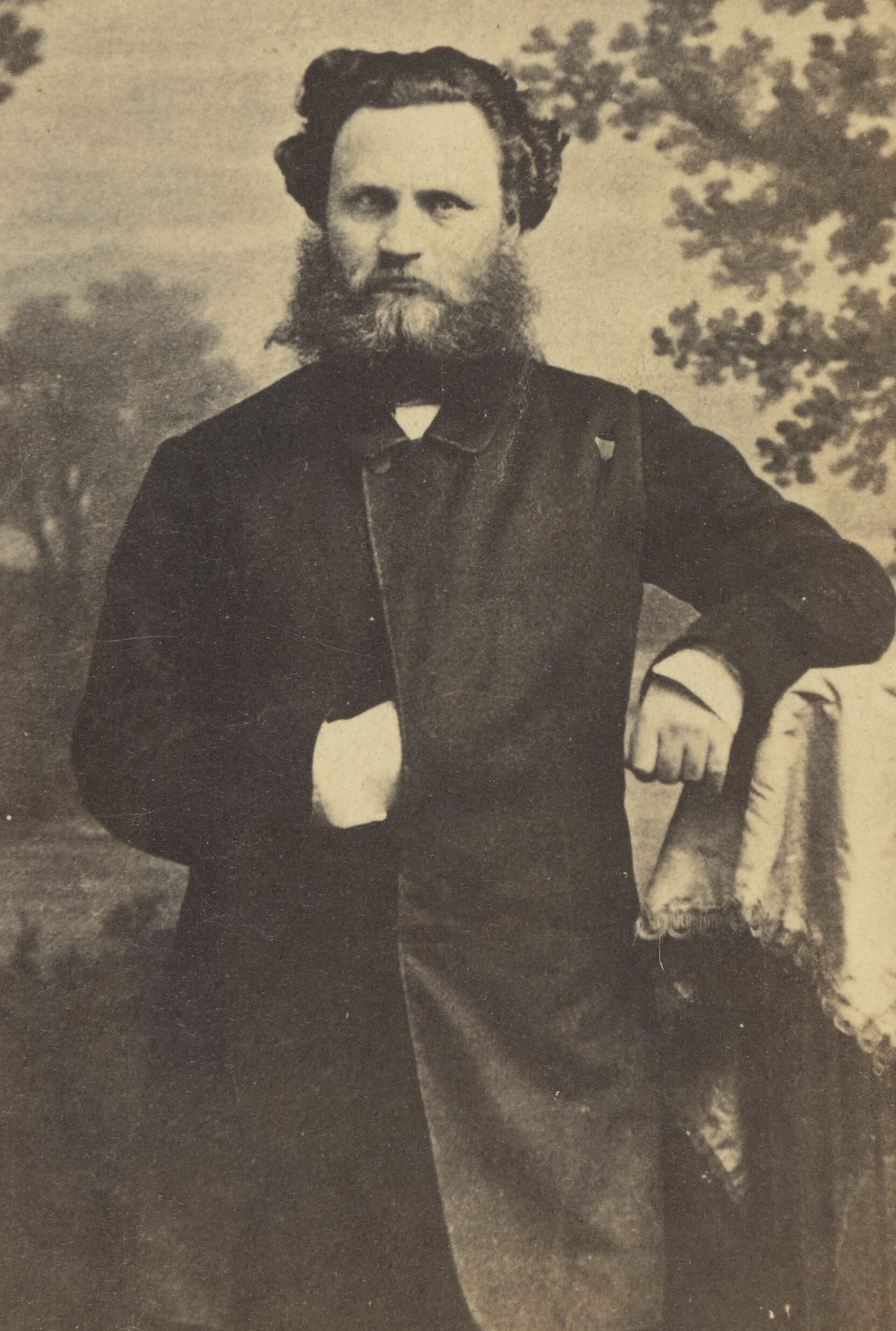
Ludwik Mierosławski

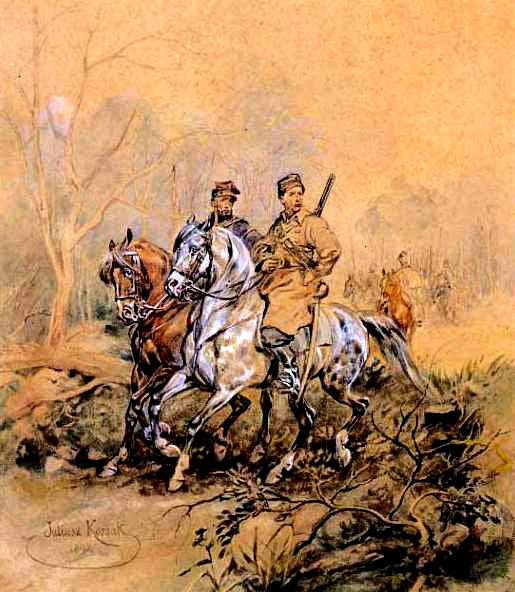
Juliusz Kossak, Polish partisans of 1863

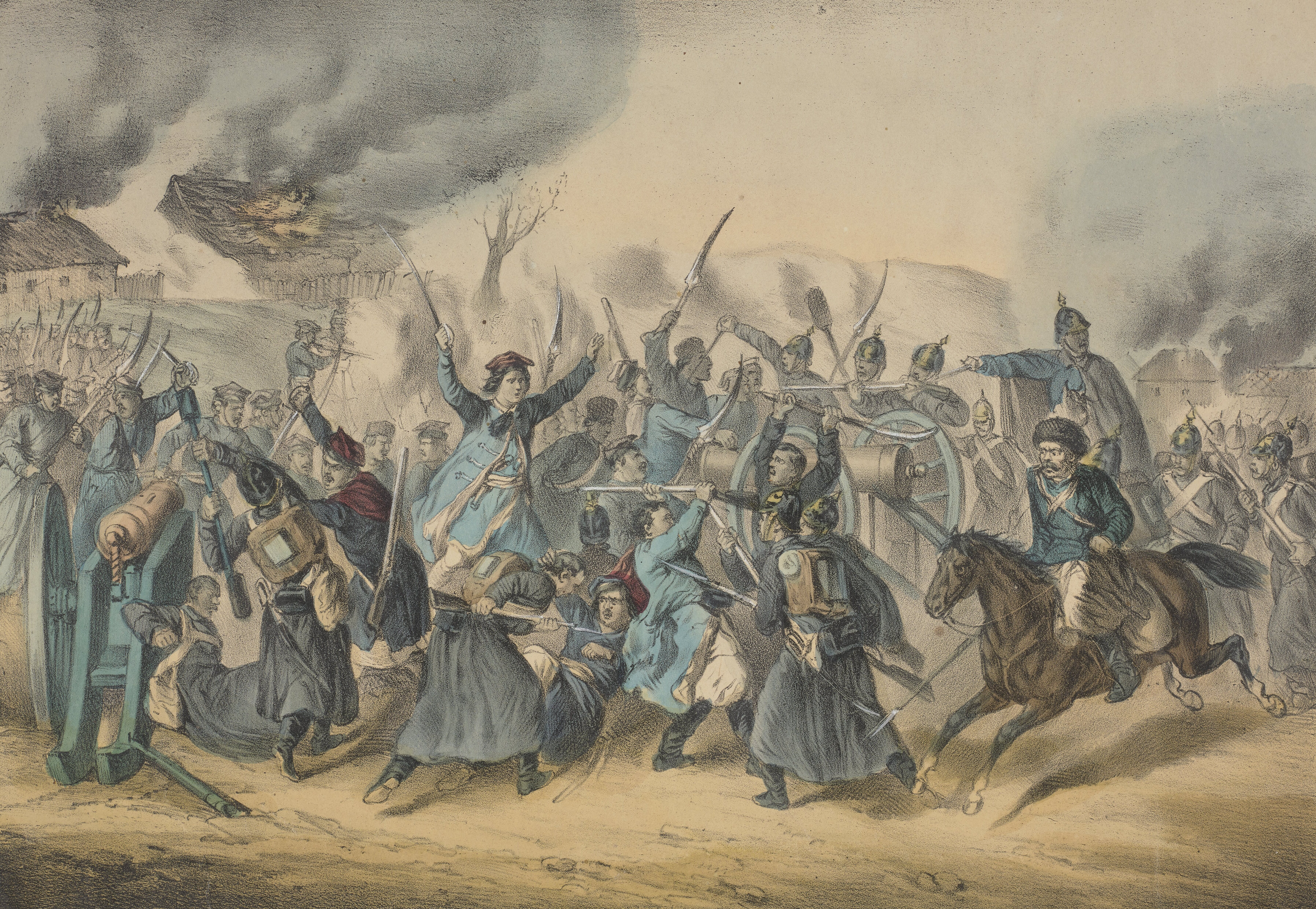
Battle of Węgrów 1863

Russian soldiers looting a Polish manor

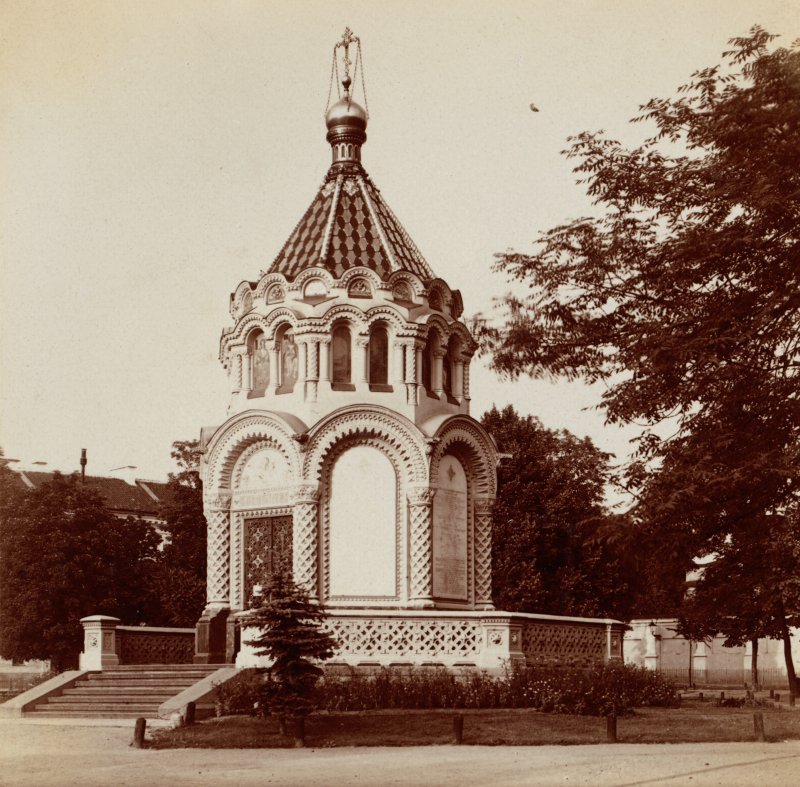
Chapel in Vilnius, erected to commemorate the crushing of the 1863 January Uprising against Russia, picture taken Sergei Mikhailovich Prokudin-Gorskii

Graves of January Uprising veterans at Warsaw's Powązki Cemetery

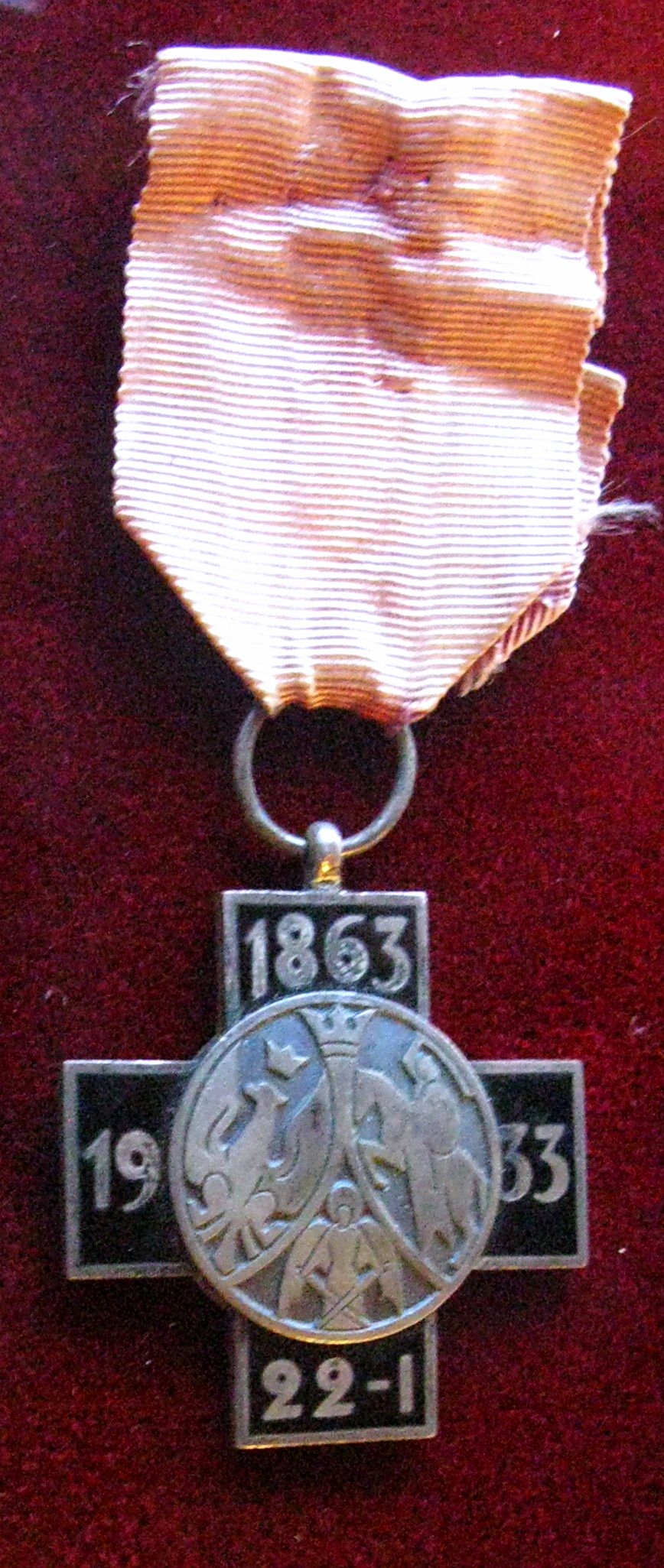
Cross commemorating 70th Anniversary of January Uprising

== See also ==
- Stefan Brykczyński
- Menotti Garibaldi
- Zouaves of Death
- Insurgence
- Polish uprisings
- Sybirak
- The Prisoners
- International Workingmen's Association
- Lapinski expedition
