= Anna Henryka Pustowójtówna =

Polish activist who fought in the January Uprising under the name "Michał Smok"

Anna Henryka Pustowójtówna, Henriette Lovenhardt, "Michał Smok"
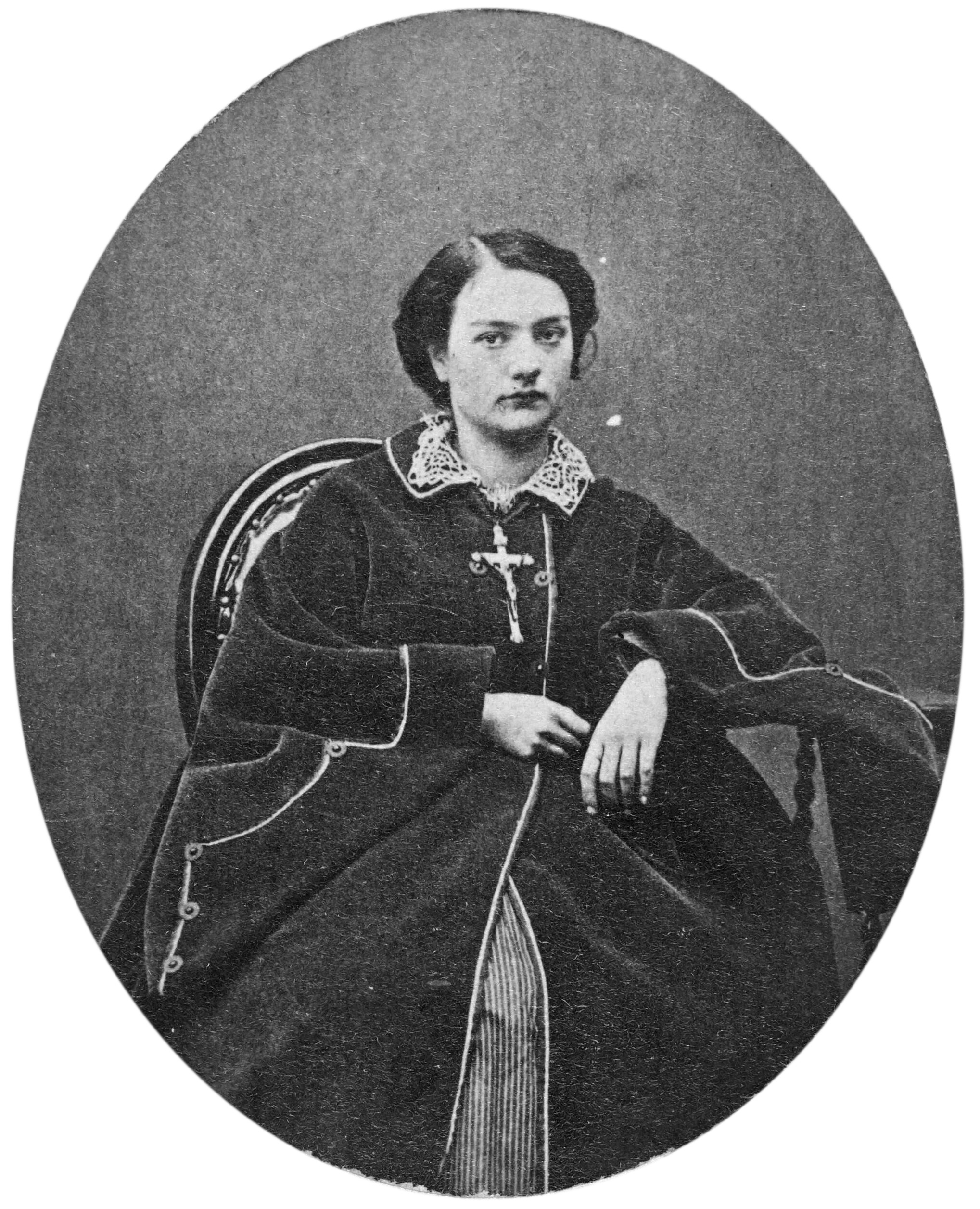
- Anna Henryka Pustowójtówna
- Born: 26 July 1838; Stare Wierzchowiska
- Died: 2 May 1881 (aged 42); Paris
- Burial place: Paris, France
- Military career
- Allegiance: Congress Poland
- Branch: Polish Partisan Army
- Service years: 1861 – 1871
- Rank: Adjutant
- Nickname: Michał Smok
- Conflicts: January Uprising: Battle of Małogoszcz, Battle of Pieskowa Skała, Battle of Chroberz, Battle of Grochowiska, Franco-Prussian War, Paris Commune
- Other work: Nurse in Paris Commune

Anna Henryka Pustowójtówna (1838 in Stare Wierzchowiska – 1881 in Paris) was a Polish activist and soldier, famed for her participation in the January Uprising.

She was the daughter of a Polish noblewoman, Marianna Kossakowska, and of a Russian officer, Teofil Pustaya, of Hungarian origin. He later became a general. After convent schooling in Lublin, she attended a finishing school in Pulawy. Despite her mixed parentage, she thought of herself as a Pole. Already in her early twenties she was arrested in 1861 for civil disobedience (singing religious hymns in public). She was sentenced to detention in an Orthodox convent in Russia, but she escaped. She made her way to Moldova, where she joined Polish partisans who were forming into units.

She became an activist in the Polish independence movement and fought in the January Uprising as adjutant to Commander Marian Langiewicz. She disguised herself as a male soldier and went by the alias "Michał Smok".

She was captured and imprisoned by the Austrian authorities and upon release she moved first to Prague, then Switzerland and finally France, where she worked as a nurse in the Paris Commune of 1870. In 1873 she married a physician, Dr. Loewenhardt, whom she had known during the Uprising in Poland. They had four children. After the death of her sister-in-law, she took over the care of the two orphaned children. She died in her sleep in Paris.
