= Grigory Skariatin =

Russian Major general (1808–1849)

Grigory Yakovlevich Skariatin
- Григорий Яковлевич Скарятин
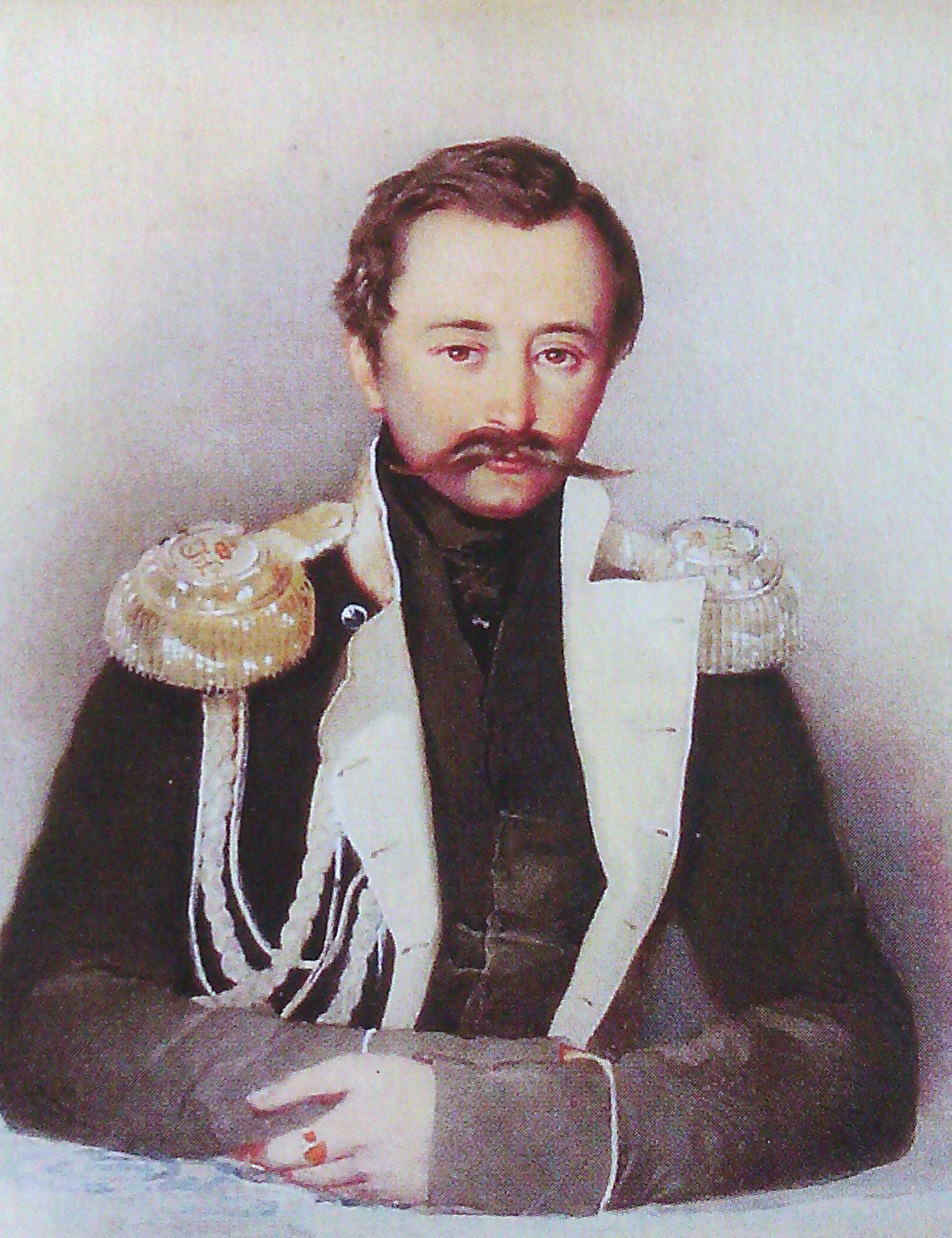
- G. Y. Skaryatin 1840
- Born: 1808
- Died: July 9, 1849 (aged 41)
- Military career
- Allegiance: Russian Empire
- Rank: Major general
- Unit: 5th Infantry Corps
- Conflicts: Battle of Sighisoara

Grigory Yakovlevich Skariatin (Russian: Григорий Яковлевич Скарятин, Grigorij Jakovlevič Skarjatin; January 13, 1808 – Segesvár, (Note: now Sighisoara, Romania) July 9 or July 31, 1849) was a Russian Major general.

On February 3, 1849, on the command of his superior, Alexander von Lüders, he crossed the Carpathians and occupied Sibiu. He faced a defeat on March 11 since the Hungarians led by Józef Bem outnumbered the Russian army. Since the Habsburg staff admitted its defeat at Sibiu, Skariatin was forced to leave Hungary. As he successfully organized the retreat, he was promoted to major general and was appointed to lead the 5th Infantry Corps. On July 31 he was hit by a cannonball at the Battle of Sighisoara, and died. According to the Russians he actually fell on July 9.
