= Wojcieszyn =

Wojcieszyn may refer to the following places in Poland:

- Wojcieszyn, Lower Silesian Voivodeship (south-west Poland)
- Wojcieszyn, Lublin Voivodeship (east Poland)
- Wojcieszyn, Masovian Voivodeship (east-central Poland)
- Wojcieszyn, West Pomeranian Voivodeship (north-west Poland)
