= Matczyn =

- Village
- Location within Poland
- Coordinates: 51°12′18″N 22°19′13″E
- Country: Poland
- Voivodeship: Lublin
- County: Lublin
- Gmina: Bełżyce

Matczyn [ˈmatt͡ʂɨn] is a village in the administrative district of Gmina Bełżyce, within Lublin County, Lublin Voivodeship, in eastern Poland.

As of 2011, the village had 503 inhabitants.
