= Płowizny =

- Village
- Location within Poland
- Coordinates: 51°11′N 22°11′E
- Country: Poland
- Voivodeship: Lublin
- County: Lublin
- Gmina: Bełżyce

Płowizny [pwɔˈvʲiznɨ] is a village in the administrative district of Gmina Bełżyce, within Lublin County, Lublin Voivodeship, in Eastern Poland.
