= Wymysłówka =

- Village
- Location within Poland
- Coordinates: 51°09′04″N 22°20′01″E
- Country: Poland
- Voivodeship: Lublin
- County: Lublin
- Gmina: Bełżyce

Population
  - Total: 180

Wymysłówka [vɨmɨˈswufka] is a village in the administrative district of Gmina Bełżyce, within Lublin County, Lublin Voivodeship, in eastern Poland.
