= Bełżyce =

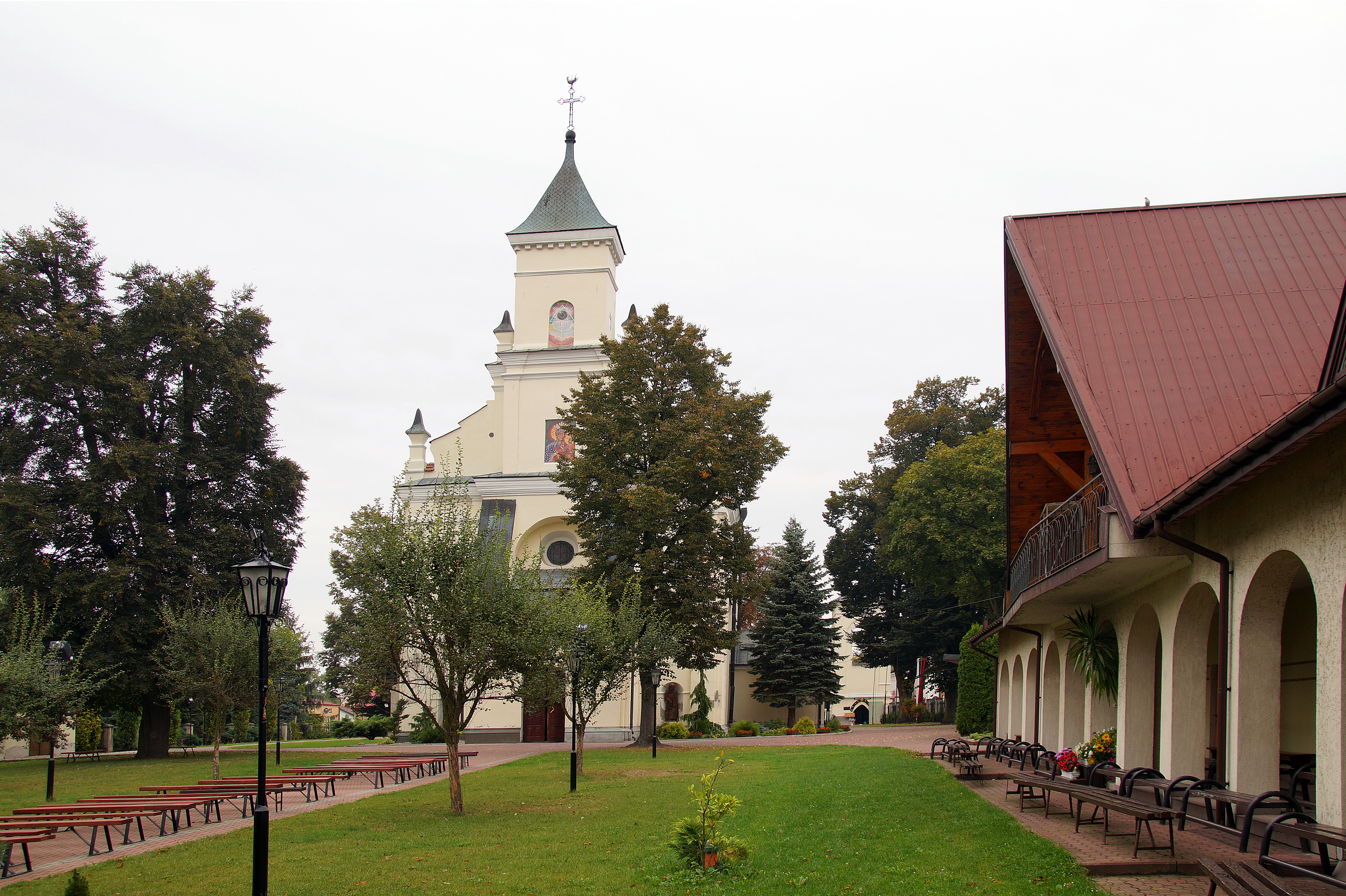
- Church of the Conversion of Saint Paul

- Flag Coat of arms

- Location within Poland
- Coordinates: 51°11′N 22°16′E
- Country: Poland
- Voivodeship: Lublin
- County: Lublin
- Gmina: Bełżyce
- Town rights: 1417-1869, 1958

Government
  - Mayor: Ireneusz Paweł Łucka

Area
  - Total: 23.46 km^{2} (9.06 sq mi)

Population (31 December 2021)
  - Total: 6,290
  - Density: 268/km^{2} (690/sq mi)
- Time zone: UTC+1 (CET)
  - Summer (DST): UTC+2 (CEST)
- Postal code: 24-200
- Area code: +48 81
- Climate: Dfb
- Car plates: LUB
- Website: http://www.belzyce.pl

Bełżyce [bɛu̯ˈʐɨt͡sɛ] is a town in eastern Poland, in the Lublin Voivodeship, in Lublin County, and about 20 km (12 mi) to the west of the city of Lublin. Bełżyce belongs to the historical region of Lesser Poland. As of December 2021, the town has a population of 6,290.

== History ==
=== Middle Ages ===
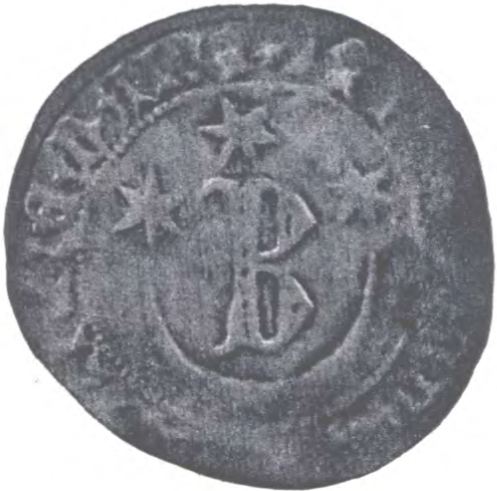
15th-century town seal of Bełżyce

Presumably, in the early 13th century, a minor royal castle was in the area of the present town. The building was transferred to local magnates, who provided ability to settle a town according to Magdeburg rights in 1349. In 1416 town settlement process began and next year king Władysław Jagiełło gave an official document, allowing Bełżyce to improve. First, town was populated by farmers, craftsmen, merchants and alcohol producers. A wooden church was built and a Catholic parish of St. Paul's conversion was created. Since 1432, while two new privileges were acquired, major growth has been noticeable – representatives of four religions lived here together. Catholics and Eastern Christians as farmers, Protestant craftsmen, and Jewish merchants. Bełżyce was a private town located in the Lublin Voivodeship, later also in the Lesser Poland Province of the Kingdom of Poland.

=== Protestant domination ===
The 16th and 17th centuries were a period of Protestant influence in the area. Bełżyce became a Protestant, Polish Brethren centre of Lesser Poland. In 1558 a Catholic church was given away and transferred into a Protestant one by Andrzej Bzicki, the town mayor. The Protestant “regime” was so well developed that the mayor issued a directive to residents to take part in services under the punishment of fine or even imprisonment. In 1575, an intellectual religious exchange took place between Rabbi Jacob Nachman of Belzyce and Martin Czechowic of Lublin. The next two centuries were a period of permanent religious riot (with Catholic attempt to retake the church in about 1630), the Cossacks assaults while Khmelnytsky’s uprising (massacre of Jews), fires and plagues of cholera and typhoid fever. A new Catholic church was built in 1670 (the old one was given back in 1654) and 113 years later there are no more Protestants in the town, as their church burned in 1783.

=== Partition period ===
In 1795, as a result of the Third Partition of Poland, Bełżyce was annexed by the Austrian Empire, it became part of the newly established administrative region of West Galicia. After the Polish victory in the Austro-Polish War of 1809, it became part of the short-lived Duchy of Warsaw, and after the duchy's dissolution in 1815, it passed to so-called Congress Poland, later forcibly integrated into Imperial Russia. The 19th century was a period of changes, as a castle was transformed into a distillery. In 1860 the town occupied nearly 950 ha with about 150 buildings. After the January Uprising, as part of anti-Polish repressions Bełżyce was stripped of its town rights, as it later turned out for nearly 100 years. Two major fires affected the town – first, in 1866, which destroyed 25 buildings, second, in 1913. The whole town was almost destroyed; residents formed a fire brigade. In 1917, 3666 people populated the town, mostly Jewish, as a result of the Russian discriminatory regulations.

=== Interwar Poland ===
Bełżyce became again part of Poland after the country regained independence in 1918. Administratively it was part of the Lublin Voivodeship.

=== World War II ===
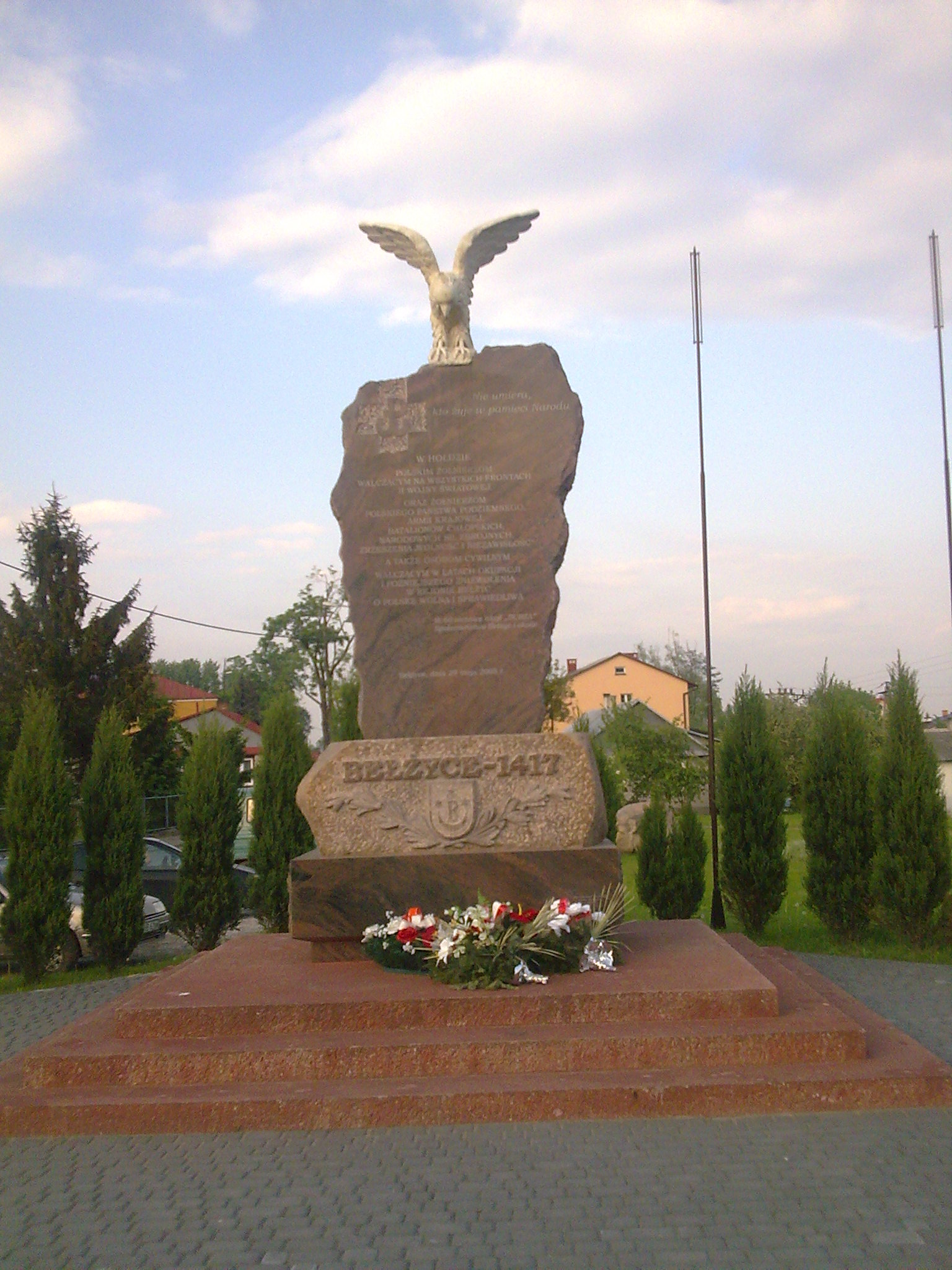
A monument commemorating Polish soldiers who fought in World War II and civilians who fought against the German and Soviet occupation

During the invasion of Poland in 1939 the town was captured by the Nazi German Army. The Jews from Bełżyce and nearby towns (including Bychawa and Piotrowice) were resettled into a dozen or so houses on Południowa Street (now Tysiąclecia Street) in December 1940. Between 1940 and 1943 there was a ghetto, consisting of Jews from around Poland and abroad. It was called a transit ghetto. The Jews kept in the crowded area of the ghetto were decimated by typhus and the terrible sanitary conditions. On May 22, 1942, 3,000 Jews from the Bełżyce ghetto were sent to Majdanek and Sobibor, where they were put into the gas chambers. Of the 2,100 Jews from the town, only around 35 survived the war. A Torah scroll from 1730 as well as both synagogues were destroyed by the Germans. The Jewish community ceased to exist.

=== Post-1945 ===
The second half of the 20th century brought little improvements to Bełżyce. In 1958 town rights were restored. In 1971 “Warmasz” (Warsaw Groceries Machines’ Factory) company opened their branch factory in Bełżyce, later substituted by a creamery equipment factory "Spomasz".

== Historic sites ==
- A castle that was built by the owners of Bełżyce in 1417, captured by the Cossack forces of Bohdan Khmelnytsky in 1648, and, since Second World War, has been used as a dairy farm.
- A late Renaissance Catholic Church of the Conversion of Saint Paul with a Catholic cemetery
- Jewish cemetery established in the 19th century.
- The manor of Brzeziński family, built in the 1840s together with the park complex.
