= Gmina Bełżyce =

Gmina Bełżyce Bełżyce Commune
- Gmina
- Coat of arms
- Interactive map of Gmina Bełżyce
- Coordinates (Bełżyce): 51°11′N 22°16′E
- Country: Poland
- Voivodeship: Lublin
- County: Lublin County
- Seat: Bełżyce

Area
  - Total: 133.85 km^{2} (51.68 sq mi)

Population (2019)
  - Total: 13,243
  - Density: 98.939/km^{2} (256.25/sq mi)
  - Urban: 6,765
  - Rural: 6,737
- Website: http://www.belzyce.pl/

Gmina Bełżyce is an urban-rural gmina (administrative district) in Lublin County, Lublin Voivodeship, in eastern Poland. Its seat is the town of Bełżyce, which lies approximately 23 kilometres (14 mi) west of the regional capital Lublin.

The gmina covers an area of 133.85 square kilometres (51.7 sq mi), and as of 2019 its total population is 13,243 (out of which the population of Bełżyce amounts to 6,504, and the population of the rural part of the gmina is 6,739).

== Villages ==
Apart from the town of Bełżyce, Gmina Bełżyce contains the villages and settlements of Babin, Chmielnik, Chmielnik-Kolonia, Cuple, Jaroszewice, Kierz, Krężnica Okrągła, Malinowszczyzna, Matczyn, Płowizny, Podole, Skrzyniec, Skrzyniec-Kolonia, Stare Wierzchowiska, Wierzchowiska Dolne, Wierzchowiska Górne, Wojcieszyn, Wronów, Wymysłówka, Zagórze, Zalesie and Zosin.

== Neighbouring gminas ==
Gmina Bełżyce is bordered by the gminas of Borzechów, Chodel, Konopnica, Niedrzwica Duża, Poniatowa and Wojciechów.
