= Podole, Lublin Voivodeship =

Podole
- Village
- Location within Poland
- Coordinates: 51°12′N 22°16′E
- Country: Poland
- Voivodeship: Lublin
- County: Lublin
- Gmina: Bełżyce

Podole [pɔˈdɔlɛ] is a village in the administrative district of Gmina Bełżyce, within Lublin County, Lublin Voivodeship, in eastern Poland.
