= Wierzchowiska Górne =

- Village
- Location within Poland
- Coordinates: 51°8′N 22°20′E
- Country: Poland
- Voivodeship: Lublin
- County: Lublin
- Gmina: Bełżyce

Wierzchowiska Górne [vʲɛʂxɔˈvʲiska ˈɡurnɛ] is a village in the administrative district of Gmina Bełżyce, within Lublin County, Lublin Voivodeship, in eastern Poland.
