= Wierzchowiska Dolne =

- Village
- Location within Poland
- Coordinates: 51°07′20″N 22°14′53″E
- Country: Poland
- Voivodeship: Lublin
- County: Lublin
- Gmina: Bełżyce

Wierzchowiska Dolne [vʲɛʂxɔˈvʲiska ˈdɔlnɛ] is a village in the administrative district of Gmina Bełżyce, within Lublin County, Lublin Voivodeship, in eastern Poland.
