= Skrzyniec-Kolonia =

- Village
- Location within Poland
- Coordinates: 51°06′49″N 22°15′30″E
- Country: Poland
- Voivodeship: Lublin
- County: Lublin
- Gmina: Bełżyce

Skrzyniec-Kolonia [ˈskʂɨɲɛt͡s kɔˈlɔɲa] is a village in the administrative district of Gmina Bełżyce, within Lublin County, Lublin Voivodeship, in eastern Poland.
