= Alexander von Lüders =

Russian military officer (1790–1874)

Count Alexander von Lüders
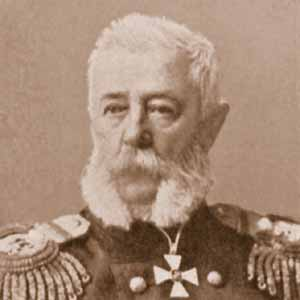
- Born: 14 January 1790
- Died: 2 February 1874 (aged 84)
- Allegiance: Russia
- Rank: General
- Battles: Battle of Warsaw (1831); Battle of Segesvár (1849)

Count Alexander Nikolaevich Liders (Russian: Алекса́ндр Никола́евич Ли́дерс, romanized: Aleksandr Nikolayevich Liders; 14 January 1790 – 2 February 1874), better known as Alexander von Lüders, was a Russian general of German descent who served as the namestnik of Poland.

== Life ==
Lüders was born to a German noble family that moved to Russia in the middle of the 18th century. His father, Major General Nikolay Ivanovich von Lüders (1762–1823), was the commander of the Bryansk regiment during the Napoleonic Wars.

Count Lüders also participated in the Napoleonic Wars and was heavily wounded in the Battle of Kulm (1813). He was distinguished during the Russo-Turkish War (1828–1829). A member of the Russian Army during the November Uprising, he participated in the Battle of Warsaw in 1831, leading the troops that captured Wola.

In 1837, he became the commander of the 5th Infantry Corps of the Russian Army. In 1843, he and his Corps took part in quelling another uprising against the Russian Empire, that of Imam Shamil during the Caucasian War. In 1848, he commanded Russian troops in Moldova and Walachia. In 1849, he commanded the 5th Corps sent to aid Austria during the Hungarian Revolution of 1848. In 1849, he defeated Polish–Hungarian forces led by General Józef Bem at the Battle of Segesvár. During the Crimean War (1854–1856), he commanded the Army South operating in the Middle Danube region.

From November 1861 to June 1862, he held the position of namestnik of Poland; he is remembered as a brutal overseer, persecuting Poles and the Catholic Church. His activities contributed to the rising tensions that culminated in the January Uprising (1863); however, Lüders had already been wounded in 1862 during an assassination attempt by the Ukrainian officer Andrij Potebnia (a member of the Committee of Russian Officers in Poland, who took revenge on Lüders for executing his revolutionary comrades), and returned to St. Petersburg before the uprising, to become one of the members of State Council of Imperial Russia. After his promotion to the State Council, the family of Lüders received the title of count. Since Lüders did not have sons, the title of count was bestowed upon Alexander Weimarn, the husband of Lüders' daughter, along with their offspring.

== Sources ==
- "Лидерс, Александр Николаевич" . Brockhaus and Efron Encyclopedic Dictionary (in Russian). 1906.
