= Battle of Segesvár =

1849 battle of the Hungarian Revolution

Coordinates: 46°14′10.6″N 24°50′45.6″E

- Part of the Hungarian Revolution of 1848
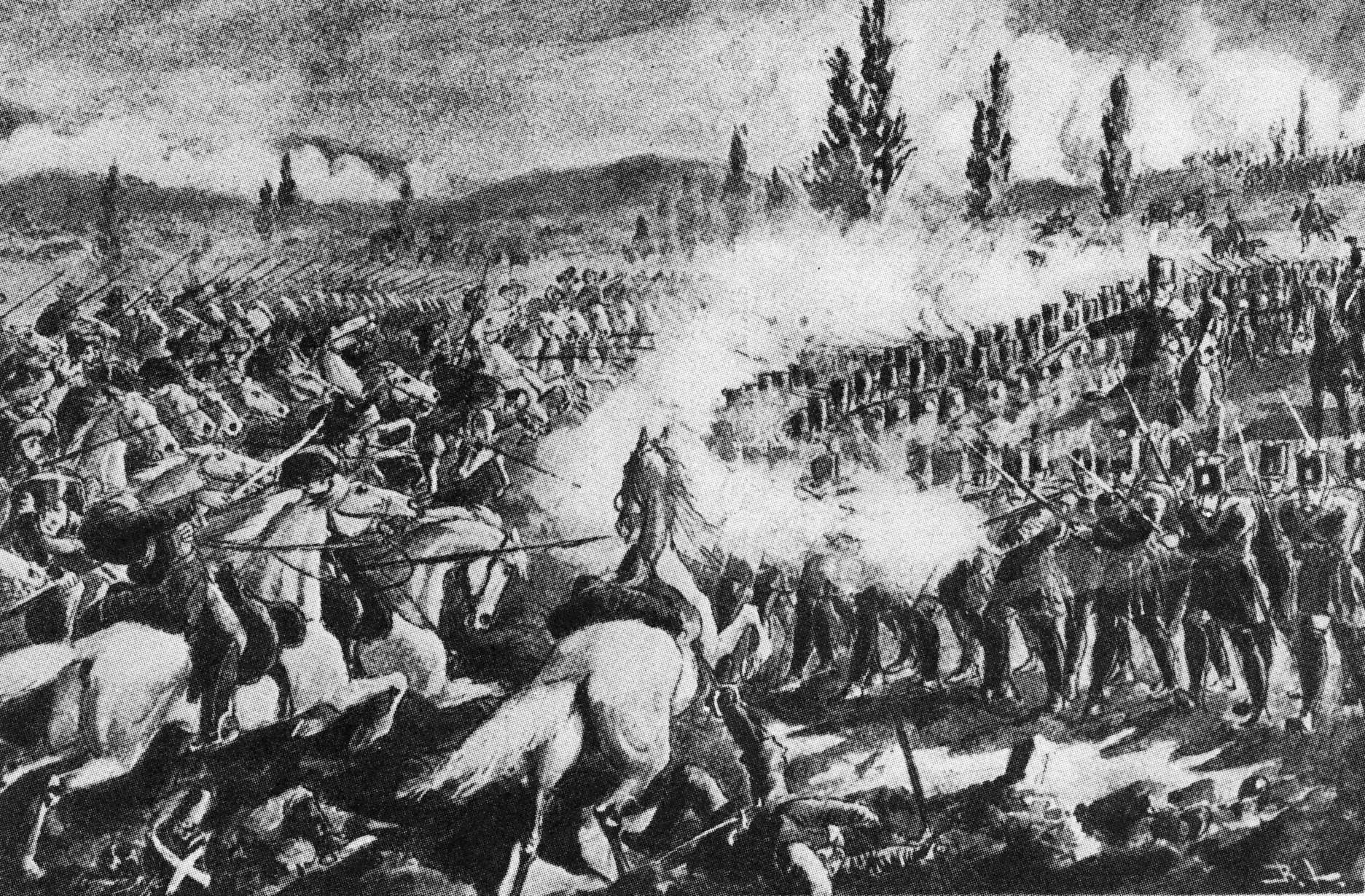
- The Battle of Segesvár (by László Bellony): Cossack charge against the Hungarian infantry.
Date	31 July 1849
Location	Segesvár, Transylvania (now Sighișoara, Romania)
Result	Russian victory

Belligerents
Hungarian Revolutionary Army	Russian Empire

Commanders and leaders
Józef Bem (WIA)	Alexander von Lüders; Grigory Skariatin †

Strength
Total: 3,307 men (13 infantry companies, 4 cavalry companies); 16 cannons Did not participate: ~3,918 (20 infantry companies, 1 1/2 cavalry companies); 8 cannons	Total: 10,183 men (40 infantry companies, 14 cavalry companies); 32 cannons

Casualties and losses
1,200 killed 500 captured 8 cannons	41 dead 205 wounded

The Battle of Segesvár (Transylvania, now Sighișoara, Romania), also called the Battle of Fehéregyháza, was a battle in the Hungarian Revolution of 1848, fought on 31 July 1849 between the Hungarian revolutionary army under the command of Lieutenant General Józef Bem and the Russian V Corps under General Alexander von Lüders. The battle ended with the victory of the Russian army, which was presumably the death location of the Hungarian poet and national hero Sándor Petőfi, but his body was never found. Furthermore, The Chief of Staff Russian V corps, General Grigory Skariatin was killed at the battle. Although heavy, the defeat was not decisive for the Hungarian army of Transylvania, Lieutenant General Józef Bem continuing his resistance in the province until the Battle of Nagycsűr on 6 August 1849.

== Background ==
Between 20–21 July, after several battles, Lieutenant General Józef Bem chased out the Austrian corps of Transylvania commanded by General Eduard Clam-Gallas from Székely Land. Then, on 23 July, passing the Ojtoz pass, he broke into Moldova, where he defeated the Russian troops of General Ustrugov, advanced to Onești and Târgu Ocna, making a proclamation to the people from here. Seeing that the population had no will to rise up against the Russians, he returned to Transylvania. His next plan was to take back Nagyszeben and the Vöröstorony Pass.

On 19–20 June the Russians broke into Transylvania, scoring some victories against the Hungarian forces, but Bem, with his clever tactical movements, managed to prevent them from accomplishing their task of pacifying the Székely Land and breaking into Hungary in order to attack from behind the Hungarian troops fighting against the main Austrian army, led by Lieutenant Field Marshal Julius Jacob von Haynau, and the Russian army led by Field Marshal Ivan Paskevich. The commander of the V. Russian corps, General Alexander von Lüders, was forced for the third time to return from the Maros valley because Bem threatened to cut his supply lines in the Székely land. He decided to eradicate once and for all the resistance from the Székely land, and for this he concentrated all the troops at his disposal: 30,000–35,000 men for a concentric attack against the enemy. For this purpose the army under his command had to advance through Segesvár to Székelyudvarhely, the column of General Magnus Johann von Grotenhjelm to Marosvásárhely, the Austrian corps led by General Clam-Gallas and the Dannenberg column which had to break into Transylvania by the Ojtoz Pass to Csíkszereda, and finally the column of Major General Dyck stationing at Fogaras to Kőhalom, and to join, if needed, with the main army of Lüders.

== Prelude ==
Lüders's main column, which started its march from Nagyszeben to Segesvár had 9,100–9,200 soldiers and 32 cannons. Bem too wanted to crush the Russians also with a concentrated attack. With the column under his command, consisting of the Beszterce, Nagyszeben and Székely divisions, the units of the Kolozsvár and the brigade of Colonel József Dobay coming from Rika he planned to attack Lüders' Russian troops from three directions. If all three columns had arrived on the battlefield, Bem would have had around 8,000 soldiers at his disposal, while the siege troops from Gyulafehérvár under the command of Colonel Miksa Stein had to execute a diversion attack towards Nagyszeben.

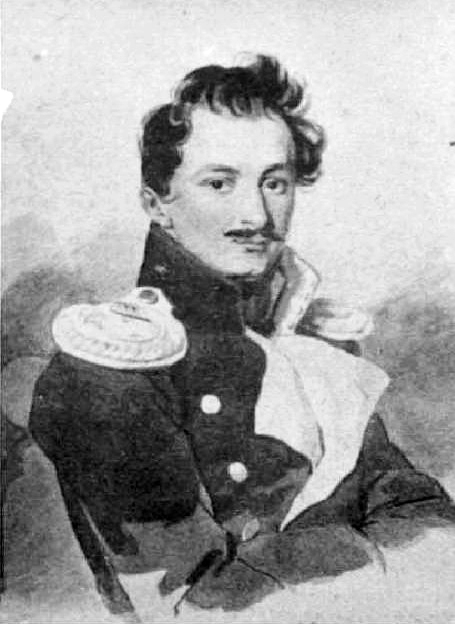
G. Skaryatin

But, without Bem's knowing, the troops from Kolozsvár of Colonel Farkas Kemény on 31 July arrived only in Marosvásárhely, while Dobay was beaten on 30 July by the Russian troops of Major General Dyck at Kőhalom. Initially Bem wanted to march through Székelykeresztúr towards Székelyudvarhely, but when he heard that Lüders was around Segesvár, he turned towards the same direction. However, he sent a battalion to help the division of Székely land under the leadership of colonel Sándor Gál, so at the start of the battle he had only 2400 soldiers. When Bem arrived, he found in Fehéregyháza the Russian vanguard, chasing them out of the village.

Lüders was on the subsequent battlefield when Bem's army arrived in Fehéregyháza from the direction of Székelyudvarhely. Seeing the small number of the Hungarian troops, he could not believe that they wanted to fight, thinking that Bem wanted only to do a demonstration attack. At the beginning Lüders believed that Bem wanted to lure all his forces into fighting while the main Hungarian troops would attack him from the direction of Marosvásárhely, so he kept the bulk of his forces on the road coming from this town. He massed 4500-4600 soldiers (five battalions of infantry, seven cavalry companies and two batteries), augmented with 1,000 others to the northern region of the battlefield, to block the road from Marosvásárhely. The weaker point of the Russian frontline was the Southern section, consisting from the Segesvár forest, because it could be more easily bypassed than the left wing protected by the Küküllő river. Here, on the right flank, Lüders placed five Jäger battalions, one sapper, four cavalry and three Cossack companies and eight cannons to the Eastern exit of Segevár on both sides of the road heading towards Székelykeresztúr. Here these troops were displayed as follows: three battalions gathered in one mass between the main road and the Nagyküküllő river, another battalion right to the road on the mountain slope, while the fifth battalion was kept in reserve at the Eastern exit of Segesvár, the artillery in the center, while the cavalry was placed behind the left wing, in a loop of the Nagyküküllő, under general Dimidov.

The Hungarian troops deployed on the mostly plain lands between Sárpatak and Ördögpatak (then distinct villages, today they are part of Fehéregyháza), while their left wing in the Ördögerdő, on a hilltop's pronounced slope. The artillery was in the center, on a less steep slope of the same hilltop, between the center and the right wing, while the bulk of the infantry (seven companies) concentrated on the left wing. Because Lüders was still waiting for a surprise attack from the direction of Marosvásárhely, he gave the command of the troops facing Bem to Lieutenant General Ivin.

=== Opposing forces ===
The Hungarian army:

Unit	Infantry company	Cavalry company	Horse	Cannon	Number
80. Honvéd battalion	2	-	-	-	1,100
82. Honvéd battalion	4	-	-	-	1,100
88. Honvéd battalion	3	-	-	-	630
Reserve of the 27. Honvéd battalion	4	-	-	-	730
Bodyguard company	1	-	-	-	117
8. Hussar Regiment	-	1	120	-	120
11. Hussar Regiment	-	1 1/2	180	-	180
15. Hussar Regiment	-	-	180	-	180
Six-pounder Nagyvárad-Debrecen Infantry Battery	-	-	?	8	250
Six-pounder Székely Infantry Battery	-	-	?	4	250
1. Six-pounder Székely Infantry Battery	-	-	?	4	250
Army total	13	2 1/2	480 + ?	16	3,307

Historian Zoltán Babucs says that Bem's troops were even smaller than that shown above. According to him, the Hungarian soldiers were 2,400 soldiers and 16 cannons.

- Troops expected by General Bem to arrive in the battle, which did not show up:

Detachment of Colonel Farkas Kemény:

- 31. Honvéd Battalion: 6 infantry companies = 861 soldiers;
- 123. Honvéd Battalion: 6 infantry companies = 1,734 soldiers;
- A squadron of the 2. Jäger Regiment: 2 infantry companies = 300 soldiers;
- Artillery = 12 horses, 2 cannons = 23 soldiers;

Total: 14 infantry companies, 12 horses, 2 cannons = 2,918 soldiers.

Detachment of Lieutenant Colonel Károly Dobay:

- 32. Honvéd Battalion: 6 infantry companies = 800 soldiers;
- 10. Hussar Regiment: 1 cavalry company, 70 horses = 70 soldiers;
- 15. Hussar Regiment: 1 1/2 cavalry company, 30 horses = 30 soldiers;
- Artillery = ? horses, 6 cannons = 100 soldiers;

Total: 6 infantry companies, 1 1/2 cavalry company, 100 + ? horses, 6 cannons = ≈1,000 soldiers

The Russian army:

Unit	Infantry company	Cavalry company	Horse	Cannon	Number
Lublin Jäger Regiment	16	-	-	-	3,137
Zamoście Jäger Regiment	16	-	-	-	3,141
5. Rifleman Battalion	4	-	-	-	568
5 Sapper Battalion	4	-	45	-	823
Nassau Uhlan Regiment	-	8	1,040	-	1,095
1. Cossack Regiment	-	6	796	-	796
3. Middle Battery	-	-	120	8	171
4. Middle Battery	-	-	120	8	175
A squadron of the 6. Light Infantry Battery	-	-	40	4	66
7. Light Infantry Battery	-	-	80	8	131
A squadron of the 9. Light Cavalry Battery	-	-	104	4	80
Army total	40	14	2345	32	10,183

== Battle ==
Bem's artillery started to shoot at the Russian troops at 10 a.m., one of the first cannon balls mortally wounding the Chief of Staff of Lüders's army, Major General Grigory Skariatin, who some months earlier, on 11 March 1849, was beaten by Bem in the Battle of Nagyszeben. The legend says that the shot which killed Skariatin was guided personally by Bem from his horse. This is refuted by the Hungarian historian Róbert Hermann who pointed out the fact that in that period the cannons were not that precise, and aiming on horseback was impossible; it was only possible on foot. The Hungarian artillerists probably observed the mounted Russian officers on the hilltop and shot at them, causing Skariatin's death. Because Lieutenant General Ivin's task was only to hold his position, he did not try to prevent the deployment of the Hungarian troops while the Hungarian artillery unleashed a devastating cannonade against the Russian light artillery which faced them, and the Russian battalions from the Segesvár forest, which he tried to encircle.

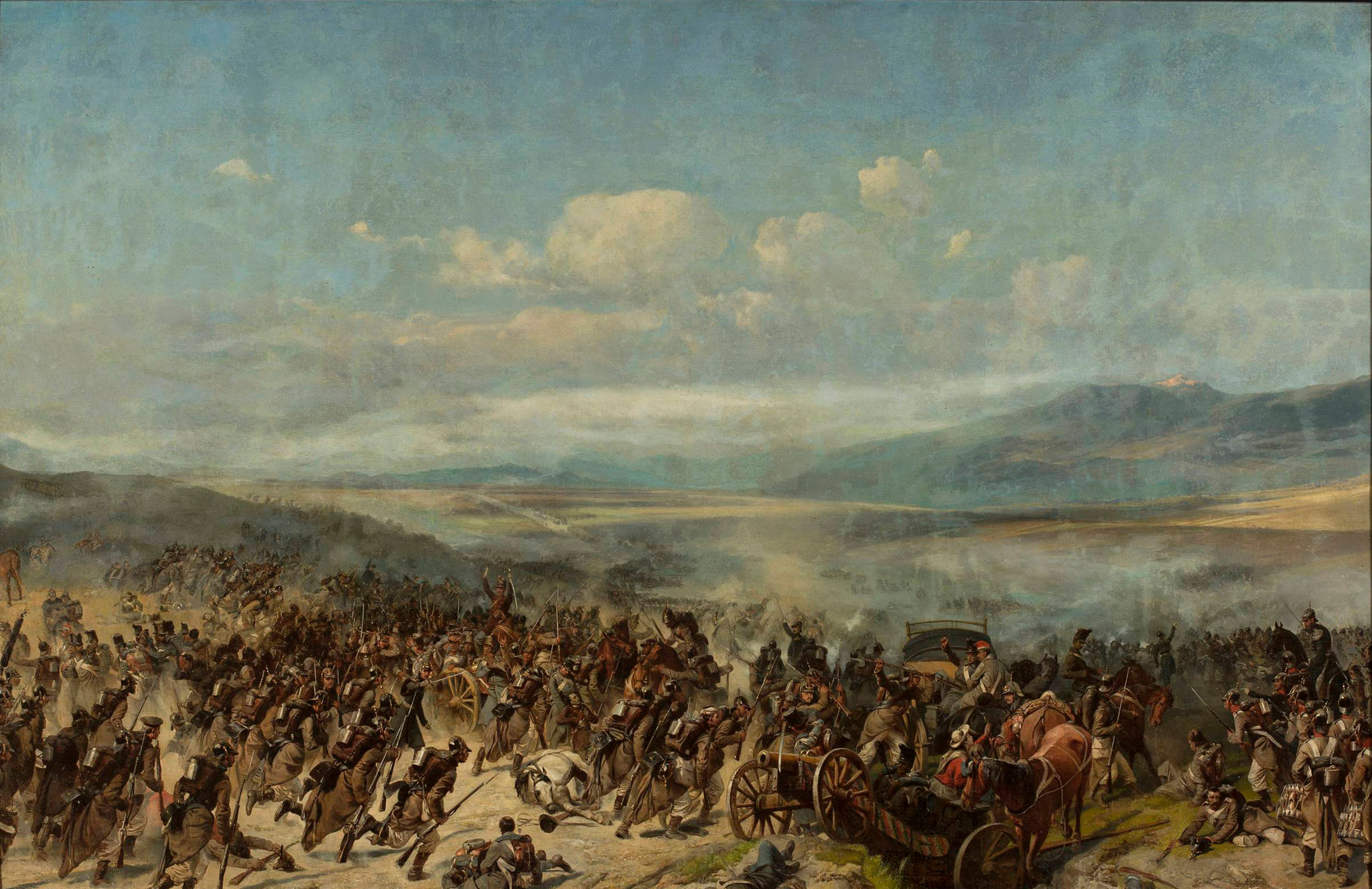
Bogdan Willewalde: the Battle of Segesvár

On the enemy's right flank, the Forest of Segesvár, from where, if Bem could take it, it was easy to overrun the Russian positions, was of strategic importance. Recognizing this, Bem sent the bulk of his left flank (5 infantry companies) forward. The Hungarian soldiers entered the Segesvár forest, climbed to a height under the control of a Russian Jäger battalion, shaking their position, but with the arriving reinforcements the Russians managed to push them back in the Ördög (meaning 'Devil') creek valley between the Segesvár forest and the Ördög forest. This fight with varying fortune lasted several hours.

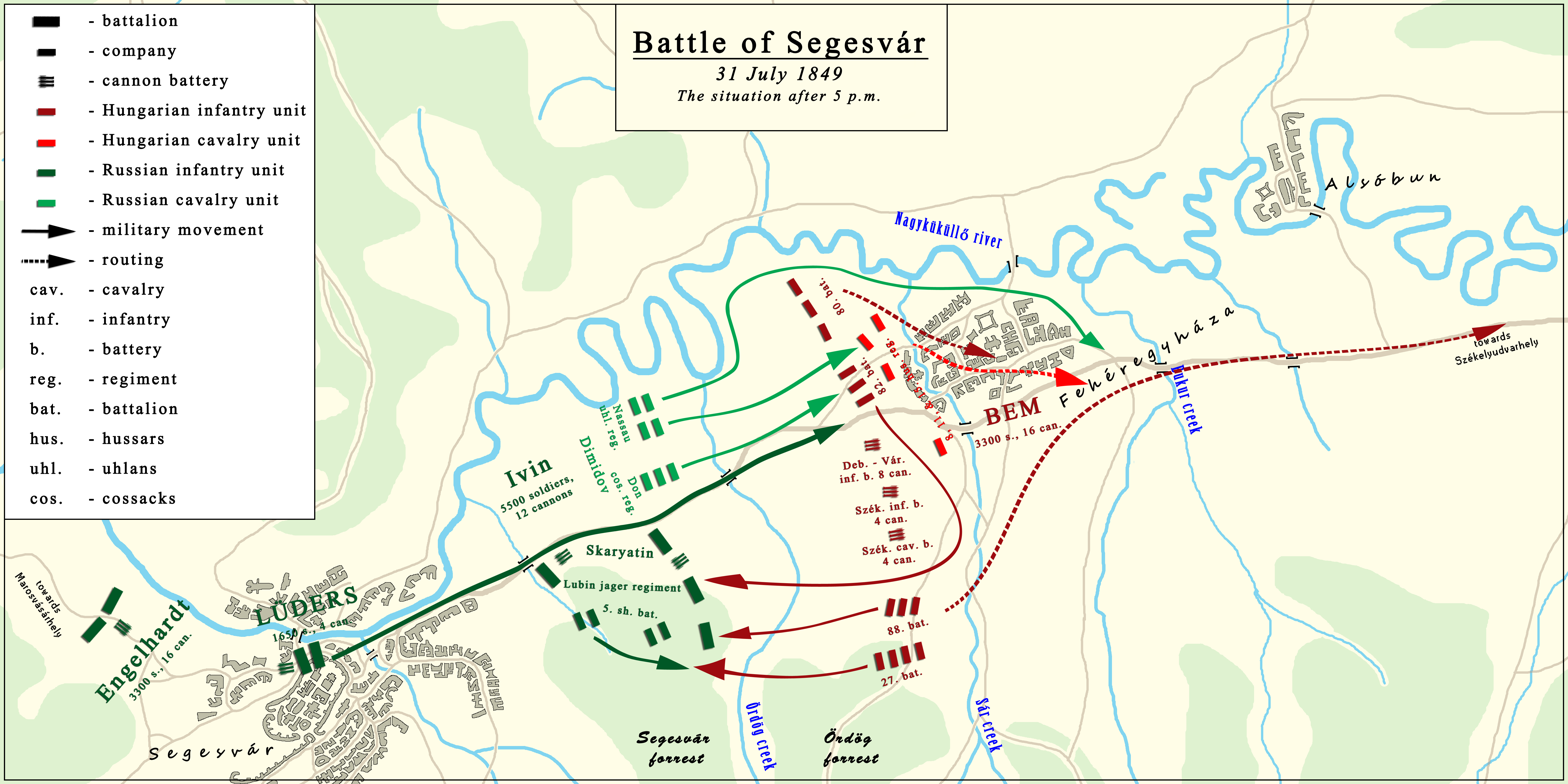
The Battle of Segesvár 31. July 1849

Because of the heavy firing, around 1 p.m. the four cannons of the Székely cavalry battery cracked. These cannons, produced by captain Áron Gábor, the founder of the Székely artillery who died earlier in the First Battle of Kökös, were produced with not entirely suitable drilling and turning equipment, as a result of which the interior of their gun barrels were not totally smooth, which made them predisposed to cracking. As a result of these accidents, Bem remained with only 12 guns. At 2 p.m. Bem sent from his left wing another two of his infantry companies into the Segesvár forest, the Hungarians attacking the Russian right wing so fiercely that its Russian commander, Colonel Lipski, demanded help from Ivin in order to withstand. The latter sent two Jäger companies, and informed Lüders about this.

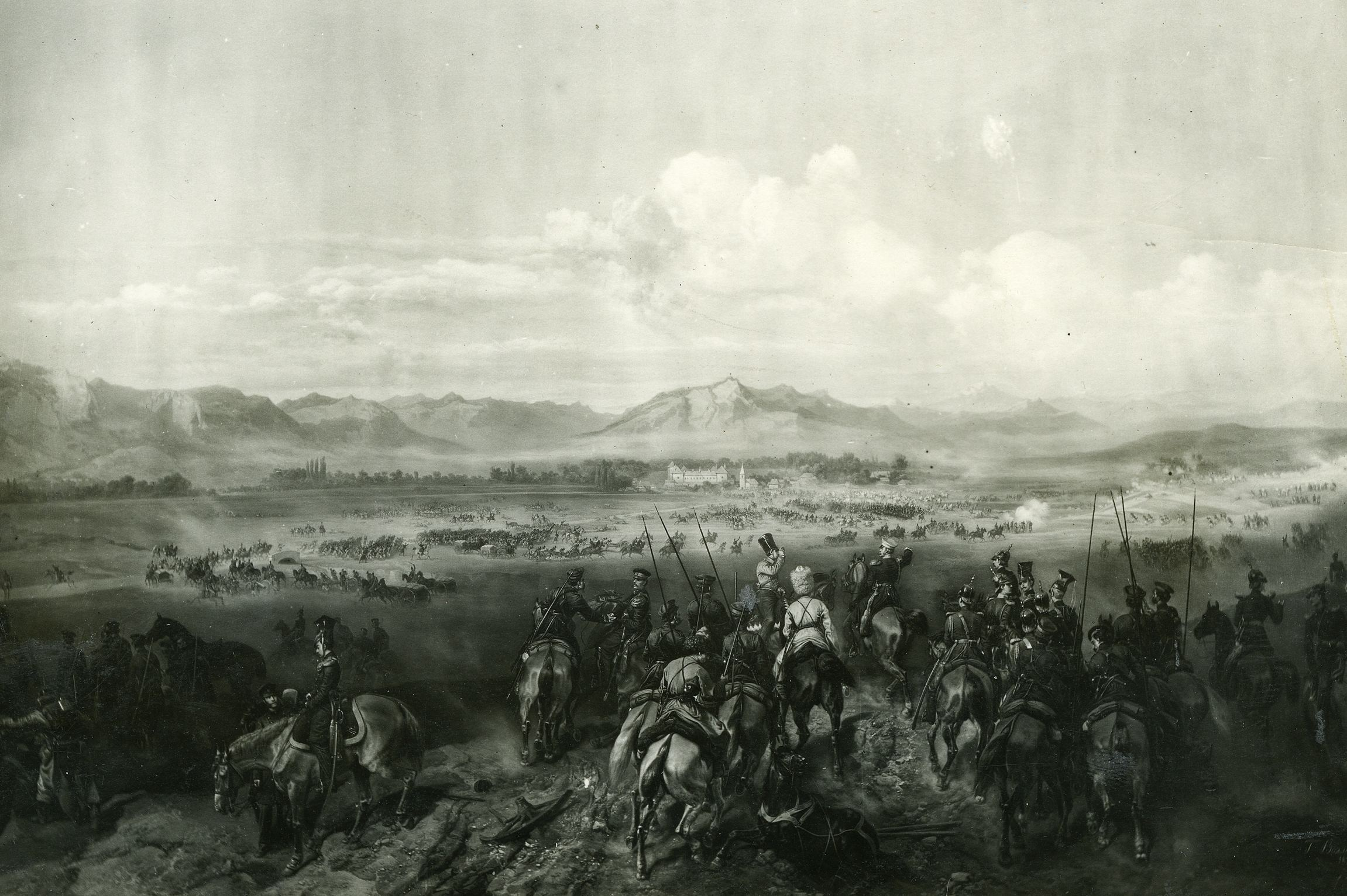
Battle of Segesvár (B. Willewalde). The Russian cavalry attack.

Meanwhile, the patrol sent by Lüders towards Marosvásárhely returned, reporting to him that no Hungarian troops would come from that direction. Thus understanding that he could attack Bem's army with all his troops, he went from the left wing to the center to take over his troops from Ivin. During these events Bem decided to make the decisive move to obtain victory, so he sent three infantry companies from his right wing on the left wing to join the attack in the Segesvár forest. On his left wing only three infantry companies and three and a half cavalry companies remained. Lüders observed that Bem strengthened his left wing, weakening his right, so he sent two Jäger companies and a half light battery, which arrived around 5 p.m. to reinforce his left wing. At the same time, he replaced his artillery from the center with six guns of a heavy battery. At 4 p.m. Lüders sent four Uhlan companies and a half-light battery against the Hungarian right wing. At 5 p.m. the Russian artillery hit and destroyed Bem's two ammunition wagons. After the superior Russian artillery defeated the crippled Hungarian artillery, Lüders decided to apply the decisive blow, so he ordered a cavalry charge against the Hungarian right flank under the command of General Dimidov.

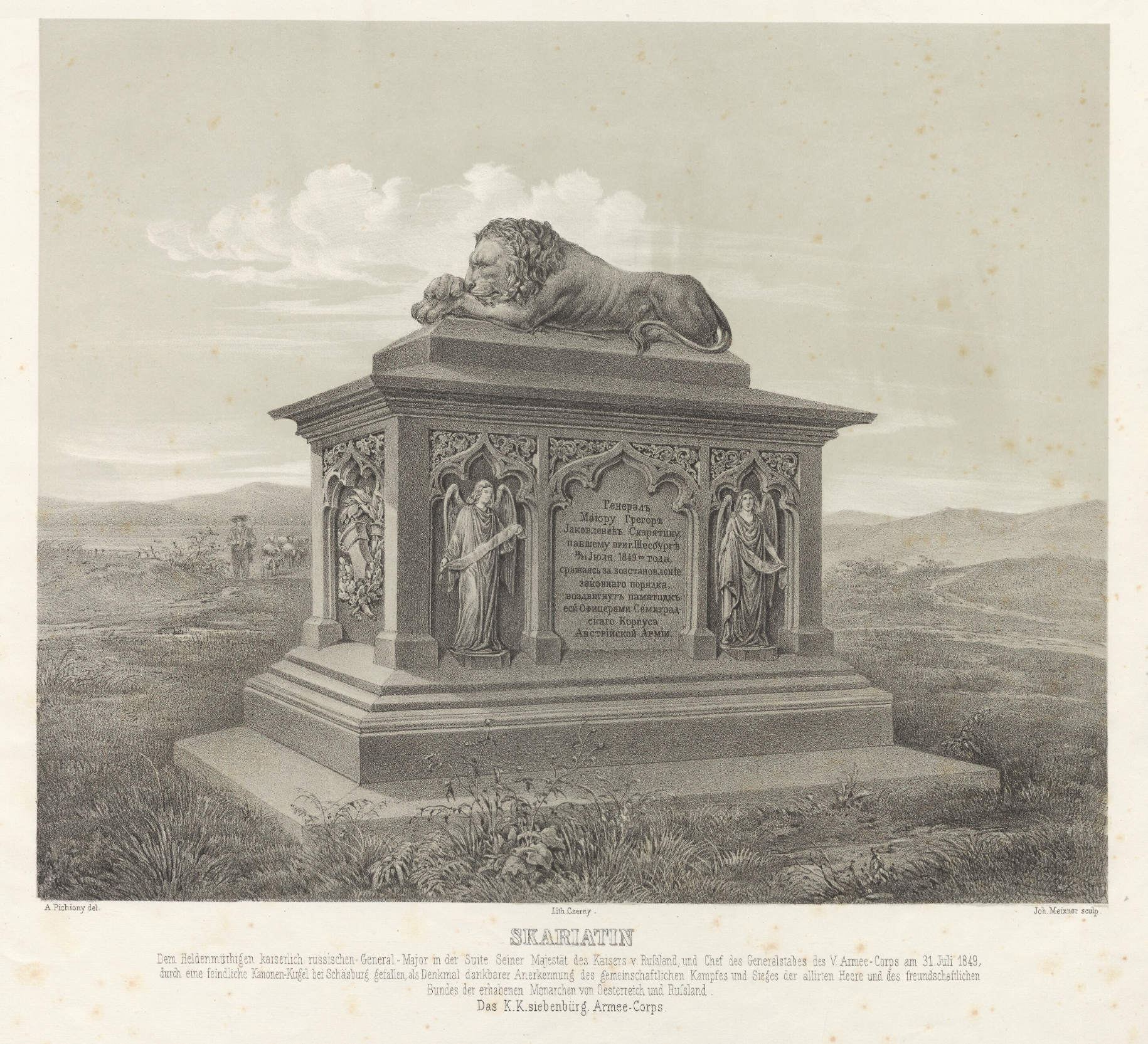
The funenrary monument of Grigory Skariatin at the battlefield of Segesvár

Two uhlan companies attacked the Hungarian infantry, another two the Hungarian cavalry. The attack was so quick that the two companies of Hungarian Hussars, covering the right flank, were unable to change the direction of their line, and also could not achieve the necessary riding speed so the uhlans pushed them back in the village. The infantry battalion withstood for a while by forming a square, but Dimidov put two cannons to spray them with canister, breaking their formation, then the uhlans attacked them, killing almost all of them, while the rest routed towards Fehéregyháza. So, as the result of the effective Russian cannon fire, the three Hungarian infantry companies crumbled in the fire of the Russian artillery, being stopped and reorganized only in Fehéregyháza. The Hungarian Hussars tried to regroup and counterattack, but the huge enemy superiority, repulsed them. Around 4 and 5 p.m. the Hungarian left wing consisting of ten companies again attacked the Russian right wing from the Segesvár forest, consisting of 16 companies. The Russians counter-attacked against the Hungarians from the back and from the sides, forcing them out of the forest, where they were routed. Thus, the disarray which started on the Hungarian right wing spread to the center, then also on the right wing, thus Bem's whole army was routed towards Fehéregyháza. The Russian cavalry crossed the Sárpatak Creek and tried to cut off the path of the retreating soldiers.

Bem understood the desperate situation and ordered the reserve, consisting of four companies of the 27th infantry battalion to cover the retreat of the artillery; then he too started to flee. His whole army was routed. The soldiers from the right wing which were closer to Nagyküküllő ran towards the northwestern edge of Fehéregyháza: the others ran towards the village's western exit, but there they ran into those who were fleeing back from the left wing, which created massive turmoil. Meanwhile, a Russian Uhlan company turned south, cutting off the path of those who ran towards Monostorkert. Here a company of the Hungarian cavalry ran into their fleeing comrades, riding down many of them. The horse-pulled retreating Hungarian artillery from the center, near the bridge, turned too quickly on the main road and the guns turned over, blocking the road. Lieutenant Dénes Kozma from the 88th battalion aligned 35 men behind this barricade, and with three salvos chased back the Uhlans trying to break into the village. Kozma then retreated with his men, but in front of the village's tavern, he stopped the attacking Russian cavalry in the same way twice.

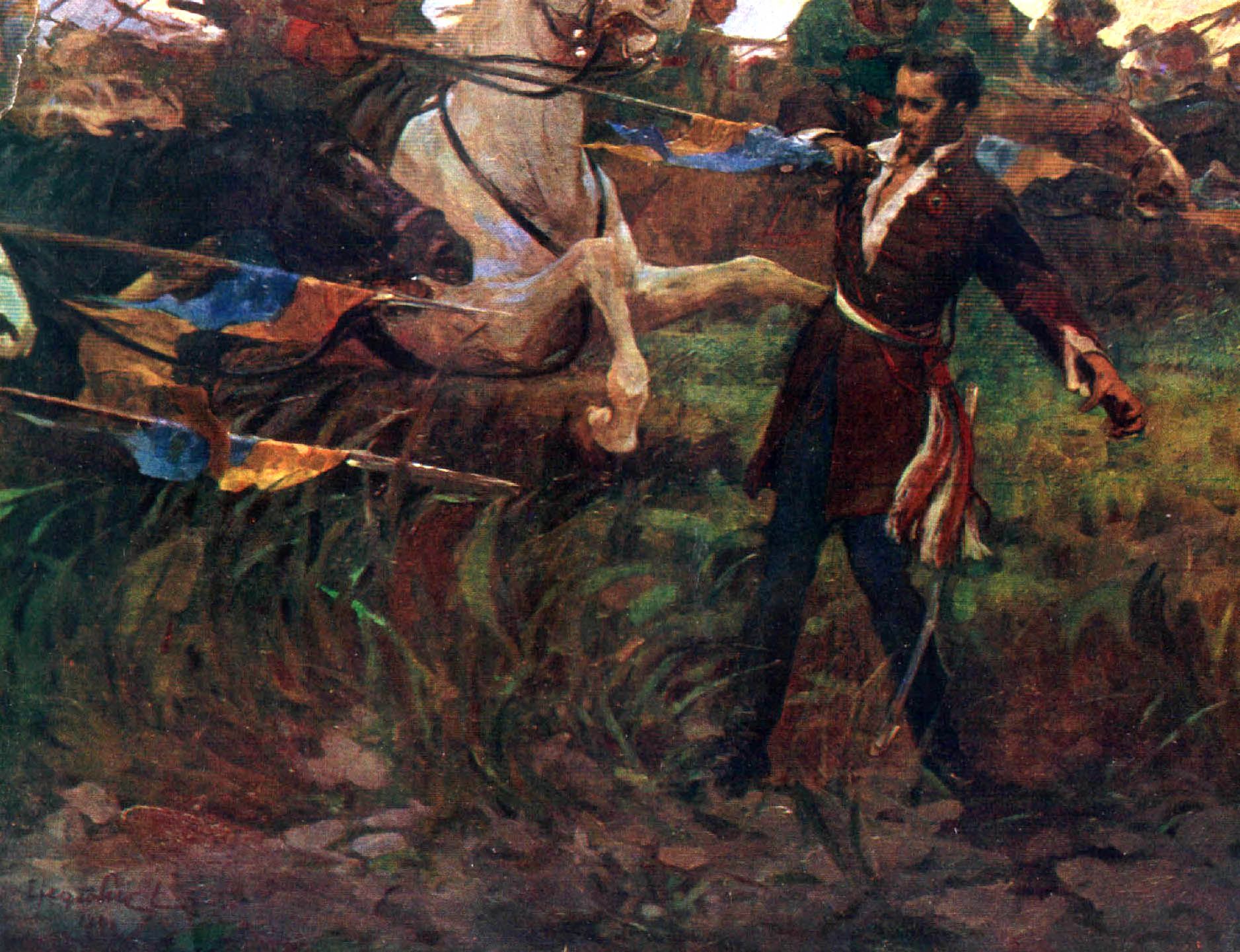
László Hegedűs (cca. 1855): Death of the Hungarian poet Sándor Petőfi

The Russian cavalry crossed the Sárpatak creek to the south of the village to block the retreating troops' way, while 2 Cossacks pushed forward on the other bank of the Küküllő to complete the encirclement.

A Russian source describes the Russian attack which decided the battle, as it follows: Until now we have been defending, but now our whole line moved forward. The artillery (...) began to pour grapeshots on the Hungarians, and our cavalry's brisk and successful charges broke up the squares from the enemy's right flank. The Hungarian ranks soon broke up and began to fall back in disorder. The Uhlans and Cossacks pursued them swiftly, bypassing the flanks of the retreating troops, cutting them off from the road, and forcing the enemy into the recently plowed fields to the right of the highway and Fehéregyháza, where their infantry and artillery could only move with difficulty. (...) The pursuit stopped at Héjjasfalva (...) when it was already completely dark (...) We took more than 500 prisoners, eight guns, four ammunition carts, two flags, a lot of firearms, and a cart loaded with many war kits and other personal belongings. We captured Bem's wagon with all his belongings and correspondence.

The Hungarian national poet, Sándor Petőfi, who shortly before the battle returned to the army while fleeing in civilian clothes and unarmed from the battlefield on foot towards Héjjasfalva, was seen for the last time, probably being killed by the Cossacks.

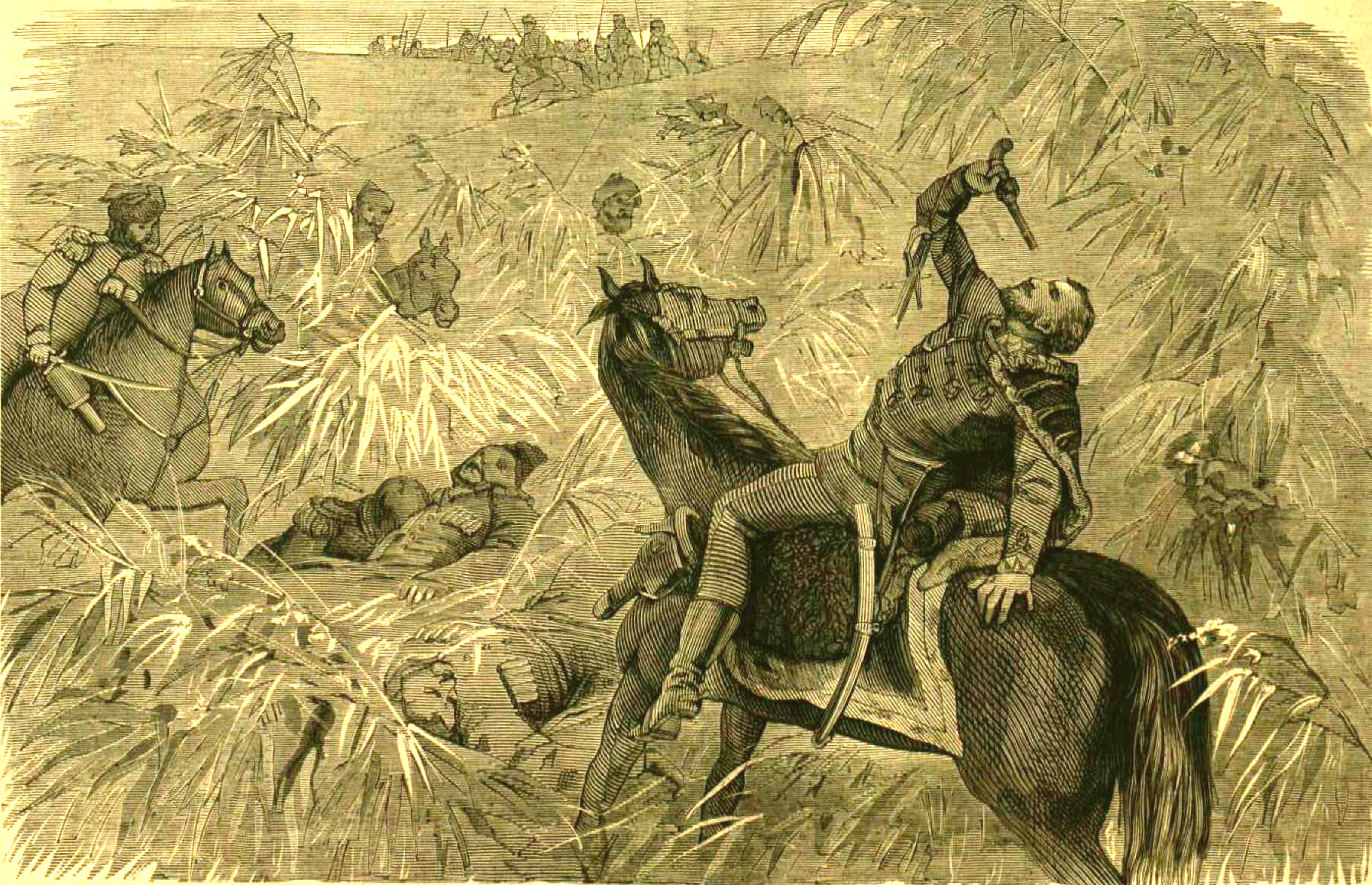
The death of Domokos Zeyk. Illustration to Mór Jókai's "Az utolsó vers s az utolsó golyó" (The Last Poem, the Last Bullet) novel

Bem himself was in grave danger. During the retreat he was wounded, he fell from his horse in a swamp near the road, saved during the night by a Hussar squad which went looking for him. Other sources say that he was about to be captured by the Russian cavalry, but the self-sacrifice of the hussar troops under the leadership of Major Zsigmond Daczó, the commander of the 11th Szekler Hussars Regiment, who died fighting until the last man, saved the commander.

Another act of heroism was done by Captain Domokos Zeyk, Bem's aide-de-camp.

The battle already finished; the Uhlans - and not Cossacks - were already returning from the pursuit, when Russian General Lüders, accompanied by numerous staff, came out from Fehéregyháza on the hill above the angle of the highway, from which the valley could be seen both below and above. While they were standing there, the general looked towards the middle of the Fejéregyháza meadow, where a hussar was galloping on his big thoroughbred pale horse. One by one he cut down the uhlans who came one-by-one and attacked him, even when three or four attacked him at once, by wounding one or two of them, he put the others to flight. He had already jumped over the meadow’s ditch, barely 100 paces from the staff, when a young Russian officer jumped out of the staff, and wanting to distinguish himself before Lüders's and the senior officers, attacked Zeyk. The first cut of Zeyk’s huge wide sword on the young officer's forehead was so powerful that his skull cap and helmet flew far away. When Lüders saw this, he was impressed. He immediately gave orders that this hussar should not be harmed but taken prisoner alive. At this command, a whole forest of spears surrounded Zeyk, but he answered every call to surrender with a slash with his sword. This infuriated his attackers. His horse and himself had already been pierced by several spears. Domokos Zeyk's sword was already broken, so he took his pistol, with which he shot one enemy soldier, then with the last bullet, he shot himself in the head. Lüders turned to the Austrian officer August von Heydte and said: Pity, he was a good soldier!

== Aftermath ==
The Hungarians lost 1,300 soldiers, while the Russians lost 246 soldiers. The Hungarian losses were half of the engaged troops. In addition to Major Daczó, several officers were killed, such as Lieutenant Sándor Gaál, who was barely 16 years old, or, as seen above, Bem's two adjutants, Major Sándor Petőfi and Captain Domokos Zeyk, while Bem was wounded. Lüders reported that by the third day after the battle, the population had buried 1,005 bodies, and even after that there were still corpses in the cornfields and the dense forest.

The defeat was heavy but not fatal. Bem lost 10% of the Hungarian troops from Transylvania. He also lost eight cannons, two banners, a large quantity of ammunition, and all the baggage, including Bem's own cart, full of very important documents. The importance of the defeat was augmented by a symbolic loss: the death of Bem's adjutant, Hungarian national poet Sándor Petőfi. On 1 August Bem's army united with the Kolozsvár and Beszterce divisions, and decided that he would prevent Lüders from attacking Székely Land, his base of operations. On 5 August Bem attacked Lieutenant General Hasford's Russian troops, defeating them in the Third Battle of Nagyszeben, chasing them as far as the Vöröstorony Pass. But Lüders reacted quickly to Bem's maneuver, arriving on 6 August in Nagyszeben, and defeating him decisively at Nagycsűr, this battle bringing the end of Bem's resistance in Transylvania.

A day after Bem's defeat at Segevár the Austrian corps led by General Eduard Clam-Gallas crushed the 6000-strong Székely division under Colonel Sándor Gál; then, on 2 August they occupied Csíkszereda, while General Magnus Johann von Grotenhjelm took Marosvásárhely. During the first week of August 1849 the majority of Transylvania fell into the hands of the Russians and Austrians. During the month and a half which passed until the start of the Russian intervention in Transylvania, the losses of the Hungarian Army of Transylvania mounted to 75% of its soldiers. Despite these huge losses, Lieutenant General Józef Bem completed his task of keeping the invading enemy troops away from the main theater of the war: Hungary.

== Gallery ==
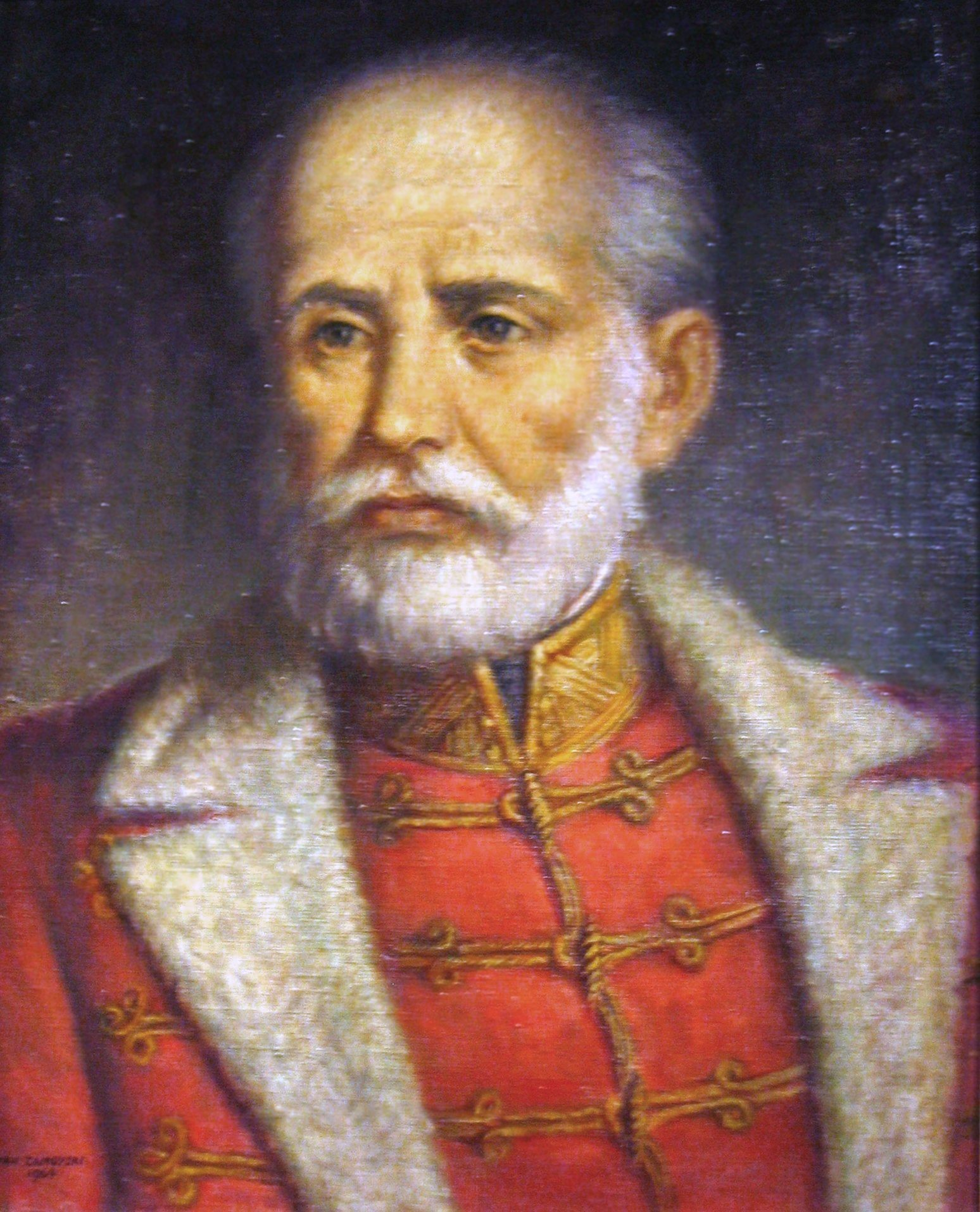
Józef Zachariasz Bem

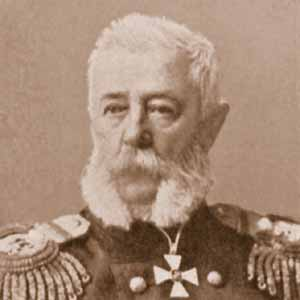
Alexander von Lüders

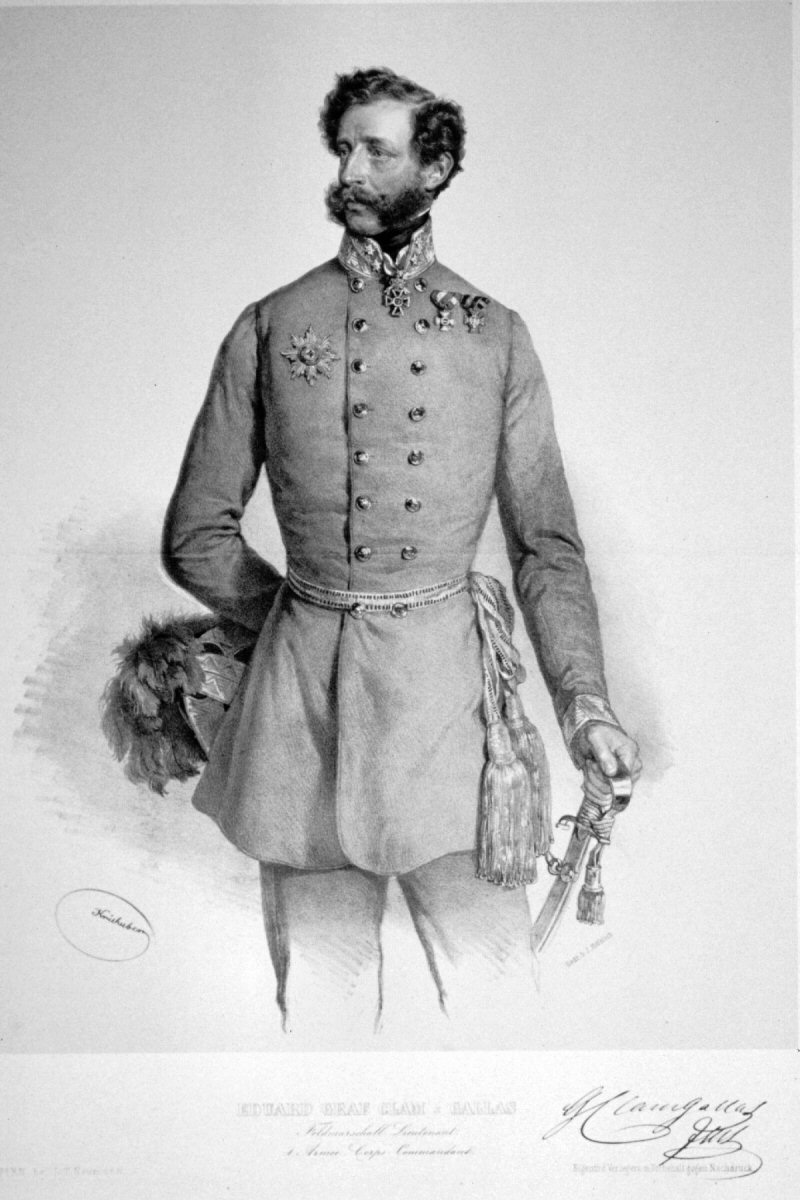
Eduard Clam-Gallas

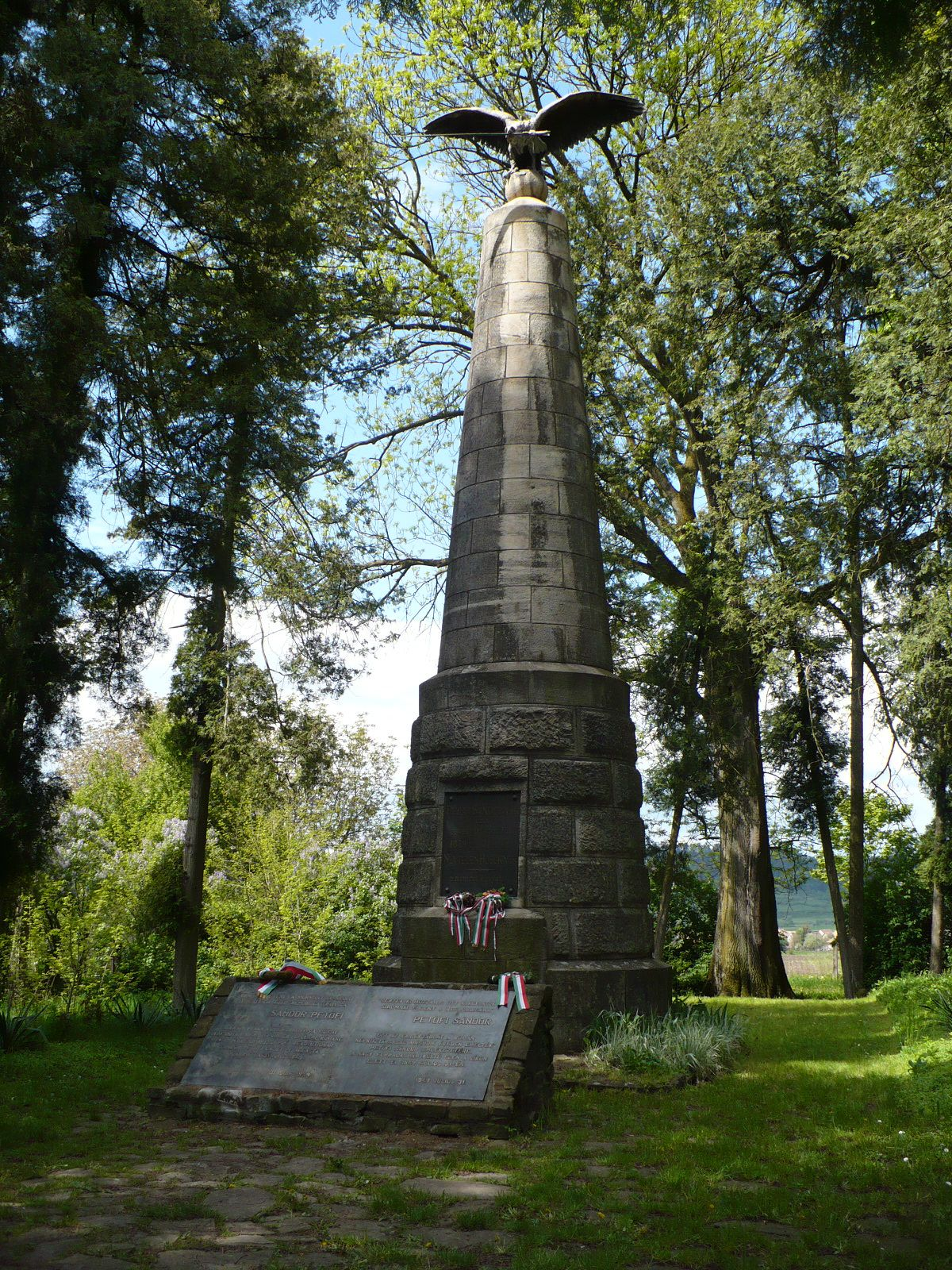
Monument of the Battle of Segesvár in Fehéregyháza

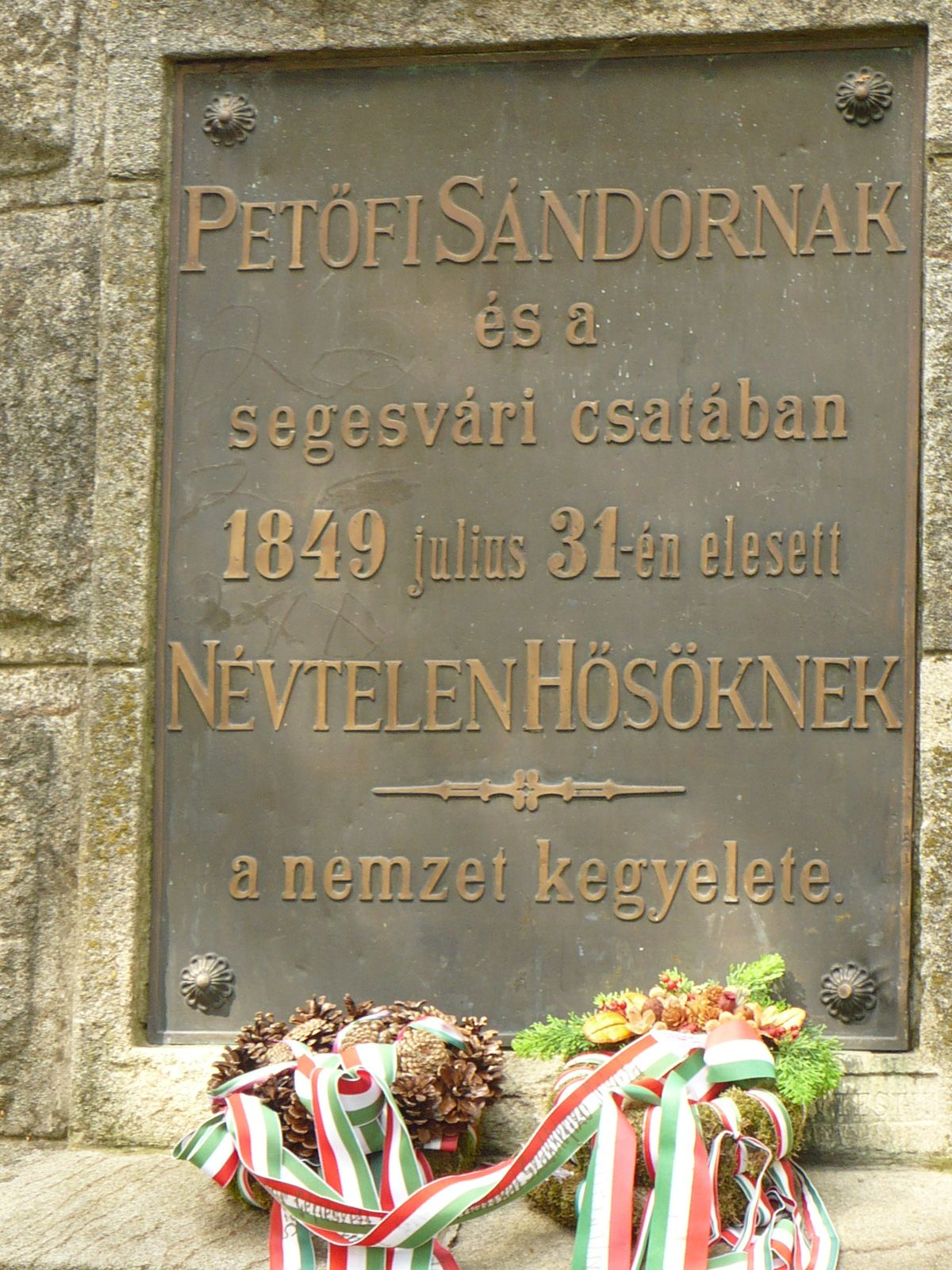
Inscription on the obelisk of the Battle of Segesvár

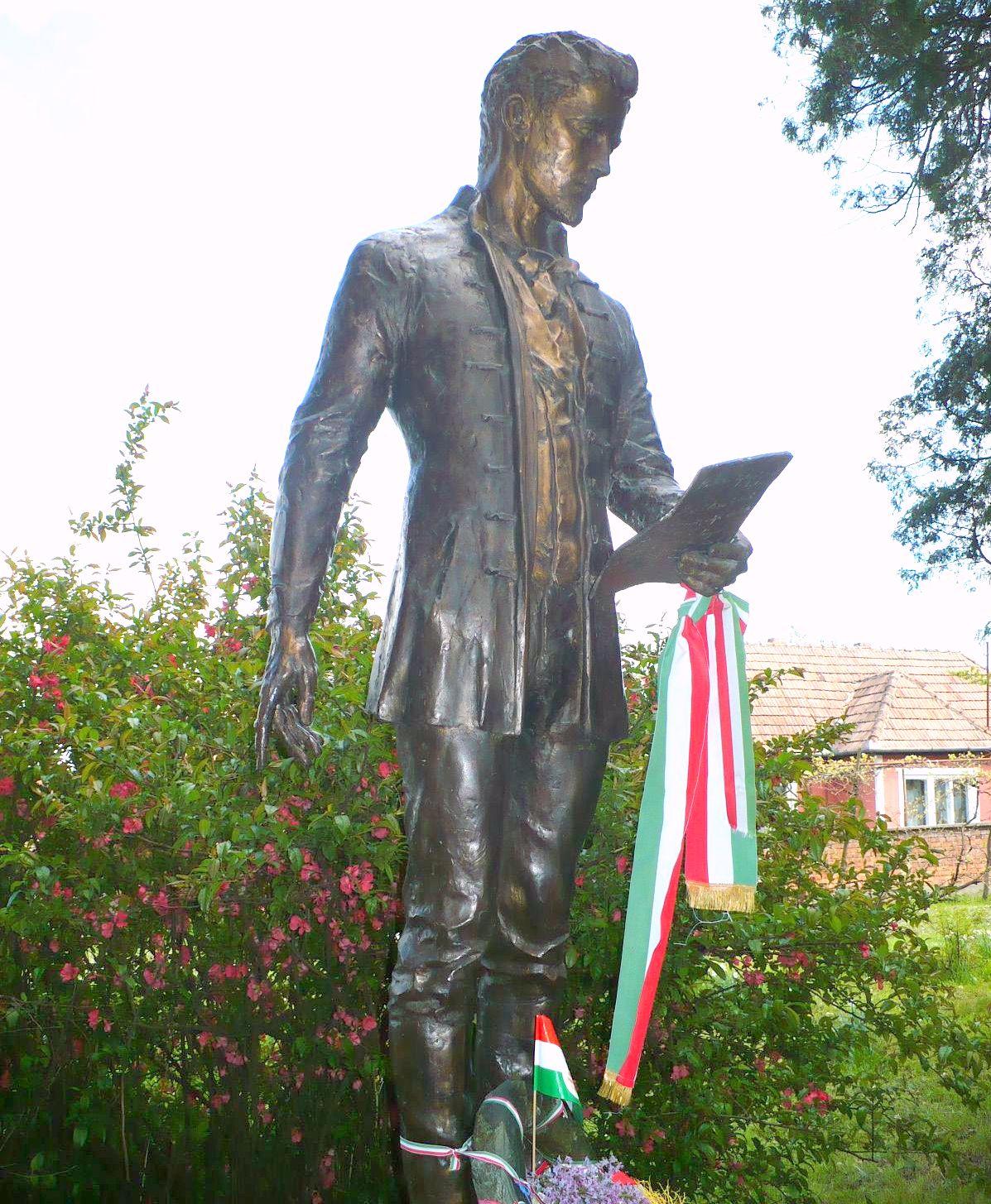
Statue of Sándor Petőfi in Fehéregyháza

== Sources ==
- Егоршина, Петрова (2023). История русской армии [The history of the Russian Army] (in Russian). Moscow: Edition of the Russian Imperial Library. ISBN 978-5-699-42397-2.
- Babucs, Zoltán (2023), ""A segesvári ütközet (1849 július 31)" (The Battle of Segesvár (31 July 1849))", Magyarságkutató Intézet (31 July 2023) (in Hungarian)
- Bánlaky, József (2001). A magyar nemzet hadtörténelme ("The Military History of the Hungarian Nation) (in Hungarian). Budapest: Arcanum Adatbázis.
- Bóna, Gábor (1987). Tábornokok és törzstisztek a szabadságharcban 1848–49 ("Generals and Staff Officers in the War of Independence 1848–1849") (in Hungarian). Budapest: Zrínyi Katonai Kiadó. p. 430. ISBN 963-326-343-3.
- Hermann, Róbert (2013). Nagy csaták. 16. A magyar függetlenségi háború ("Great Battles. 16. The Hungarian Freedom War") (in Hungarian). Budapest: Duna Könyvklub. p. 88. ISBN 978-615-5129-00-1.
- Kozłowsky, Eligiusz (1958). General Józef Bem. Warsaw: Hungarian Ministry of Defence. pp. 543–549.
