= Malinowszczyzna =

- Village
- Location within Poland
- Coordinates: 51°08′40″N 22°10′59″E
- Country: Poland
- Voivodeship: Lublin
- County: Lublin
- Gmina: Bełżyce

Malinowszczyzna [malʲinɔfʂˈt͡ʂɨzna] is a village in the administrative district of Gmina Bełżyce, within Lublin County, Lublin Voivodeship, in eastern Poland.
