= Chmielnik-Kolonia =

- Village
- Location within Poland
- Coordinates: 51°11′52″N 22°12′34″E
- Country: Poland
- Voivodeship: Lublin
- County: Lublin
- Gmina: Bełżyce

Chmielnik-Kolonia [ˈxmʲɛlɲik kɔˈlɔɲa] is a village in the administrative district of Gmina Bełżyce, within Lublin County, Lublin Voivodeship, in eastern Poland.
