= Zalesie, Gmina Bełżyce =

Zalesie
- Village
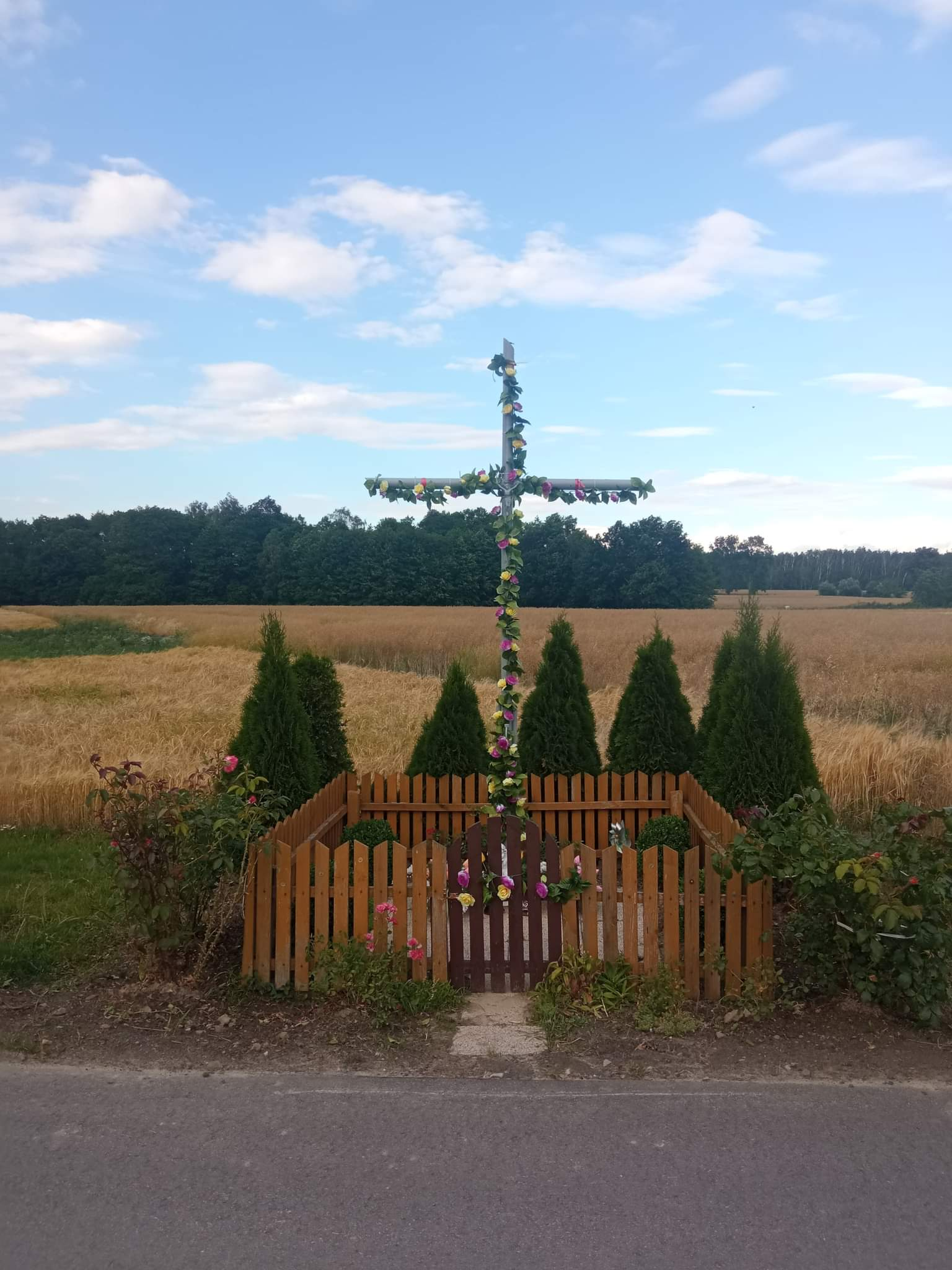
- Roadside cross in Zalesie, Bełżyce commune, Lublin Voivodeship.

- Location within Poland
- Coordinates: 51°7′51″N 22°14′29″E
- Country: Poland
- Voivodeship: Lublin
- County: Lublin
- Gmina: Bełżyce

Zalesie [zaˈlɛɕɛ] is a village in the administrative district of Gmina Bełżyce, within Lublin County, Lublin Voivodeship, in eastern Poland.
