= Skrzyniec, Lublin Voivodeship =

Skrzyniec
- Village
- Location within Poland
- Coordinates: 51°7′N 22°15′E
- Country: Poland
- Voivodeship: Lublin
- County: Lublin
- Gmina: Bełżyce

Skrzyniec [ˈskʂɨɲɛt͡s] is a village in the administrative district of Gmina Bełżyce, within Lublin County, Lublin Voivodeship, in eastern Poland.
