= Zosin, Lublin County =

Zosin
- Village
- Location within Poland
- Coordinates: 51°12′N 22°19′E
- Country: Poland
- Voivodeship: Lublin
- County: Lublin
- Gmina: Bełżyce

Zosin [ˈzɔɕin] is a village in the administrative district of Gmina Bełżyce, within Lublin County, Lublin Voivodeship, in eastern Poland.
