= Battle of Pieskowa Skała =

Part of the January Uprising

- Part of the January Uprising
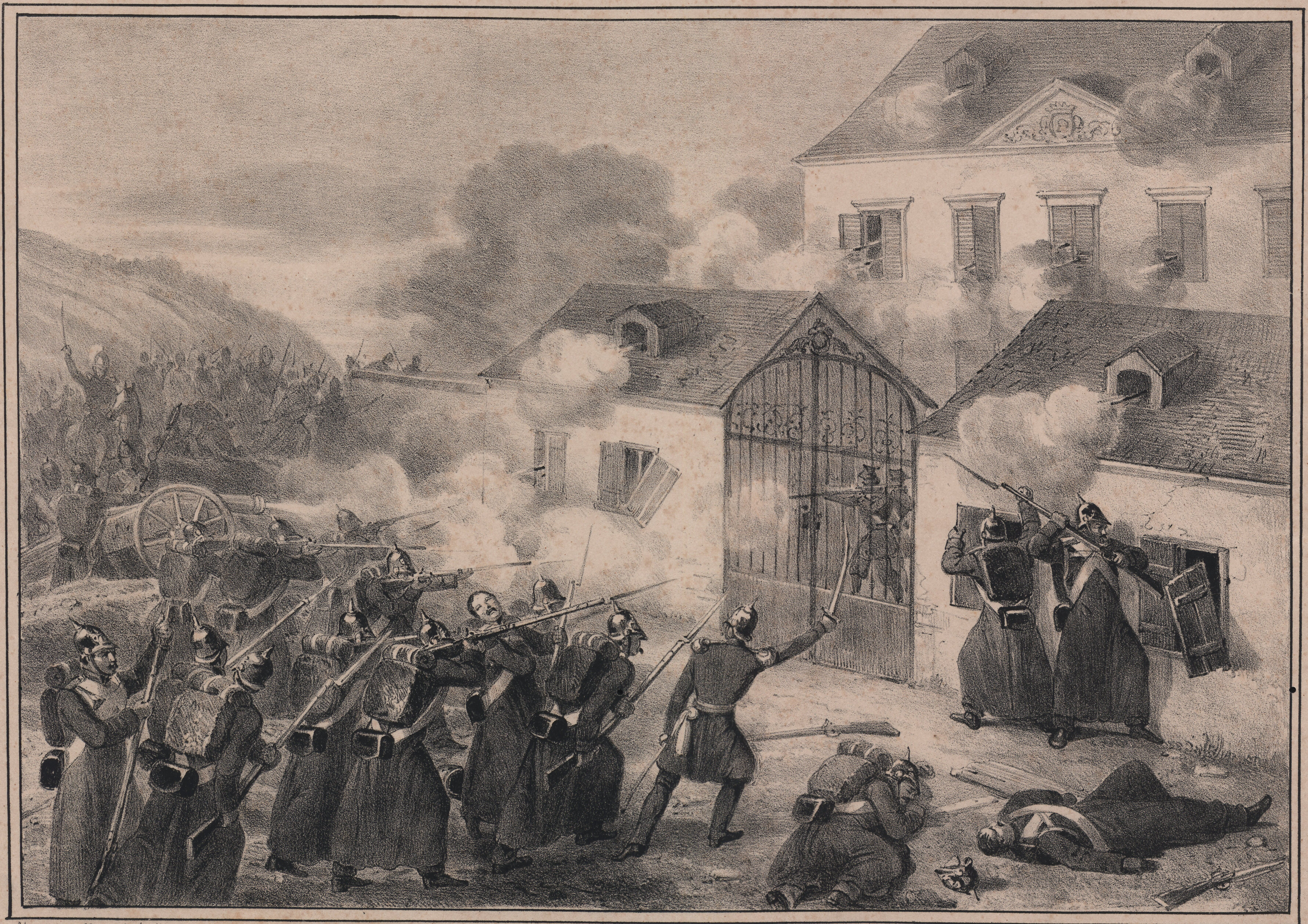
Date	4 March 1863
Location	Pieskowa Skała
Result	Polish Tactical victory

Belligerents
(Poland) Polish Insurgents	Russian Empire

Commanders and leaders
Marian Langiewicz	Alexey Ivanovich Shakhovskoy

The Battle of Pieskowa Skała, one of many skirmishes of the January Uprising, took place on 4 March 1863 near Pieskowa Skała in southwestern corner of Russian-controlled Congress Poland. A party of Polish insurgents commanded by Marian Langiewicz, heading towards the border with Galicia (Austrian Partition of Poland), clashed with units of the Imperial Russian Army.

After the Battle of Małogoszcz, Polish insurgents with Langiewicz reached on 3 March the Pieskowa Skała Castle, where they decided to rest. On the same day Langiewicz, who was military leader of the districts of Kraków and Sandomierz, issued an appeal to the residents of Austrian Poland. Polish insurgents were followed by three Russian units, who surrounded Pieskowa Skała. The Russians were stationed in Olkusz, Miechów and Myszków.

On the night of 3-4 March the Russians carried out a surprise attack on those rebels who slept in a building outside of the castle. Alarmed, the insurgents fought them, losing 2 men and then retreating from Pieskowa Skała. Those who failed to withdraw were killed by the Russians, and the castle itself was ransacked. In the morning of 4 March the clash continued, as more Russian troops arrived to the area of Pieskowa Skała, chasing the insurgents, who tried to escape towards nearby Galicia. Among those insurgents who were killed in the battle was a Ukrainian revolutionary, Andrij Potebnia.

Another skirmish at Pieskowa Skała took place on 15 August 1863, when 400 Polish insurgents commanded by Count Krukowiecki attacked a Russian infantry company.

== Sources ==
- Stefan Kieniewicz: Powstanie styczniowe. Warszawa: Państwowe Wydawnictwo Naukowe, 1983. ISBN 83-01-03652-4.
