= Stare Wierzchowiska =

- Village
- Location within Poland
- Coordinates: 51°07′19″N 22°16′20″E
- Country: Poland
- Voivodeship: Lublin
- County: Lublin
- Gmina: Bełżyce

Stare Wierzchowiska [ˈstarɛ vʲɛʂxɔˈvʲiska] is a village in the administrative district of Gmina Bełżyce, within Lublin County, Lublin Voivodeship, in eastern Poland.
