= Andriy Potebnia =

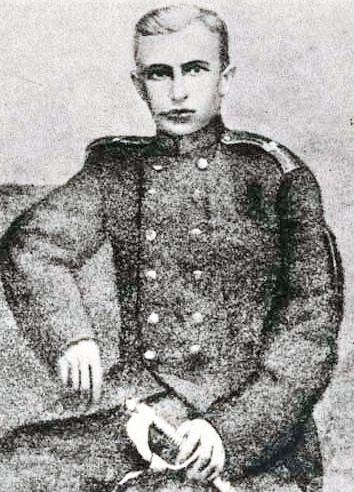
Andriy Potebnia

Andriy Opanasovych Potebnia (Ukrainian: Андрі́й Опана́сович Потебня́; Russian: Андре́й Афана́сьевич Потебня́; 31 (O.S. 19) July 1838–4 March (20 February) 1863) was a revolutionary and Russian Imperial Army officer of Ukrainian ethnicity. A member of the Land and Liberty secret organization, he took part in the Polish uprising of 1863 and died fighting on the side of the rebels.

== Biography ==
A native of Perekopivka near Romny in Poltava Governorate, Potebnia stemmed from a Cossack starshyna family. His brother was the philologist Alexander Potebnja. After graduating from the Cadet Corps in Saint Petersburg, he served as an officer of Shlisselburg Regiment. During his stay in the imperial capital Potebnia entered the circle of Polish revolutionary democrats Jarosław Dąbrowski and Zygmunt Padlewski. After his regiment's transfer to Poland, he created a revolutionary "Committee of Russian officers in Poland", which in November 1862 joined the Land and Liberty society.

Together with members of Polish underground organizations, Potebnia started preparations for a joint revolt against the Tsarist regime. On 9 July (O.S. 27 June) 1862 he attempted to assassinate Grand Duke Konstantin Nikolayevich of Russia, the viceroy of Poland, and had to go into hiding. While in the underground, Potebnia composed several addresses and pamphlets supporting the rebel cause, some of which were published in the Kolokol newspaper. He also visited London, meeting with Alexander Herzen and Nikolay Ogarev. After the beginning of January Uprising, Potebnia joined the insurgents and died in a battle against Tsarist troops at Pieskowa Skała near Kraków.

== Legacy ==
A eulogy for Potebnia was published by Ogarev in Kolokol newspaper on 13 (1) May 1863. His tombstone on a common grave near Kraków, where he was buried, read:

Ukrainian Andriy Potebnia, former officer of Russian military and a companion of Alexander Herzen.

Herzen himself described Potebnia's death in battle as "the cleanest and most selfless sacrifice, which Russia could put on the altar of revolutionary struggle of Polish and Russian peoples".

== Sources ==
- Франчук В.Ю. ПОТЕБНЯ Андрій Опанасович [Електронний ресурс] (link)
