= Wojcieszyn, Lublin Voivodeship =

Wojcieszyn
- Village
- Location within Poland
- Coordinates: 51°12′41″N 22°20′08″E
- Country: Poland
- Voivodeship: Lublin
- County: Lublin
- Gmina: Bełżyce

Wojcieszyn (Polish pronunciation: [vɔjˈt͡ɕɛʂɨn]) is a village in the administrative district of Gmina Bełżyce, within Lublin County, Lublin Voivodeship, in eastern Poland.
