= Luboń koło Poznania railway station =

Railway station in Luboń, Poland

Luboń koło Poznania
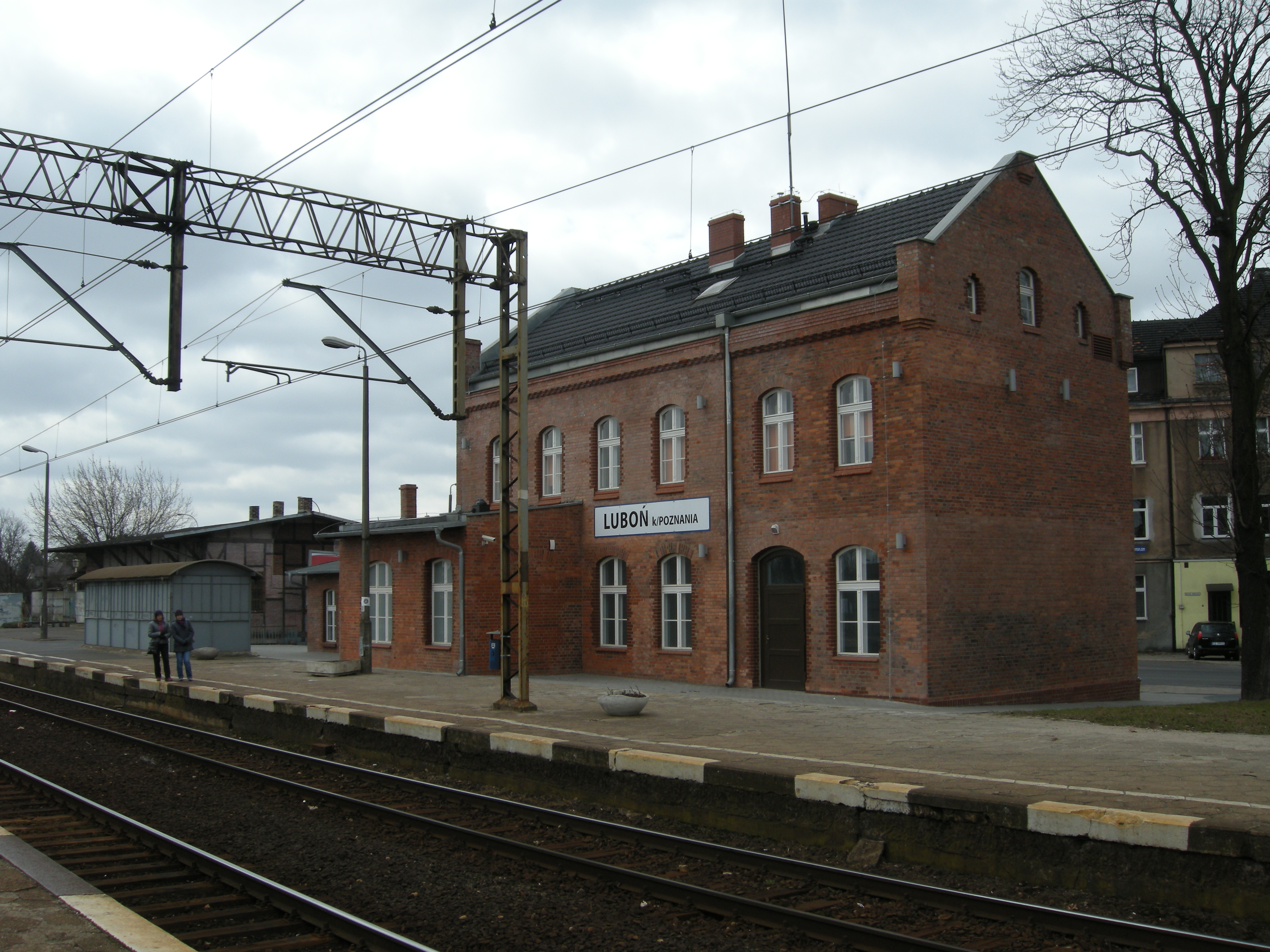
- Luboń koło Poznania railway station

General information
- Location: Luboń, Greater Poland Voivodeship; Poland
- Coordinates: 52°20′38″N 16°53′33″E
- System: Railway Station
- Operator: Polregio; Greater Poland Railways
- Lines: Wrocław–Poznań railway Sulechów–Luboń koło Poznania railway
- Platforms: 3

History
- Opened: 29 October 1856; 169 years ago

Services
Preceding station	Polregio	Following station
Poznań Dębiec towards Poznań Główny	PR	Puszczykowo towards Wrocław Główny
Preceding station	KW	Following station
Poznań Dębiec towards Poznań Główny	Poznań - Wolsztyn	Wiry towards Wolsztyn
Poznań Dębiec towards Poznań Główny	Poznań - Rawicz	Puszczykowo towards Rawicz
Preceding station	Poznań Metropolitan Railway	Following station
Puszczykowo towards Kościan	PKM1	Poznań Dębiec towards Gniezno
Wiry towards Grodzisk Wielkopolski	PKM3	Poznań Dębiec towards Wągrowiec
Location
- Location within Poland

Luboń koło Poznania railway station is a railway station serving the town of Luboń, in the Greater Poland Voivodeship, Poland. The station opened on 29 October 1896 and is located on the Wrocław–Poznań railway and Sulechów–Luboń koło Poznania railway. The train services are operated by Polregio and Greater Poland Railways.

== History ==
In 1853, the Prussian authorities granted the Society of Upper Silesian Railways a concession to build a railway line from Wroclaw to Leszno and Leszno to Poznan. The work was completed on 29 October 1856, when a single-track railway line from Wroclaw via Leszno to Poznan opened. In Lubon the Upper Silesian Railway bought the land for the construction of the line from August Cieszkowski, owner of the Żabikowo country estate. The boundaries of the property included a part of the village Luboń and hence in 1904, the original name of the station Żabikowo was changed in accordance with its location to Luboń (in German Luban). Building the station building in Lubon was probably simultaneously with the opening of the railway line. Built of red brick floors, with attic housed the waiting room and room service, and the main entrance was from the street. On 1 July 1909 was opened the newly built line from (Poznan) - Luboń - Grodzisk.

During World War I Luboń station was already an important strategic point passed by military transport. Gunpowder and explosives were made in Lubon at this time. From 29 November 1918 the Polish Union of Railwaymen was established in Poznan, who gradually took control of the railways in the Greater Poland region, preventing deportation to Germany of rails, food and military equipment. One of the episodes of the Greater Poland Uprising took place at the station in Lubon, where on 30 December 1918 the insurgents captured German military train with six guns and fifteen cars flour. After regaining independence, the service on the railways was by Polish railwaymen. Some of them found work and settled in Lubon ( Bocianówko ). During World War II, Germany took over the management of the whole rail network. Most Luboń railway workers were forced to work on the railway for the Third Reich. After the liberation, the railway infrastructure was rebuilt. In February 1945 fixed tracks Poznan-Lubon, where there was only undamaged water intake for steam locomotives, and in the spring launched a line Poznan Central - Leszno, which was electrified (all the way) on 20 December 1969. For the next 40 years there has been tremendous development of rail passenger and freight transport. By the end of the 1980s Luboń was a major station marshalling yard, which employs about 300 railroad workers.

== Train services ==
The station is served by the following service(s):

- Regional services (R) Wroclaw - Leszno - Poznan
- Regional services (KW) Wolsztyn - Grodzisk Wielkopolski - Poznan

== Bus services ==
- 610 (Poznan Debiec - Lubon - Poznan Gorczyn)
