= Poznań Dębiec railway station =

Railway station in Poznań, Poland

Coordinates: 52.3695°N 16.9015°E

Poznań Dębiec
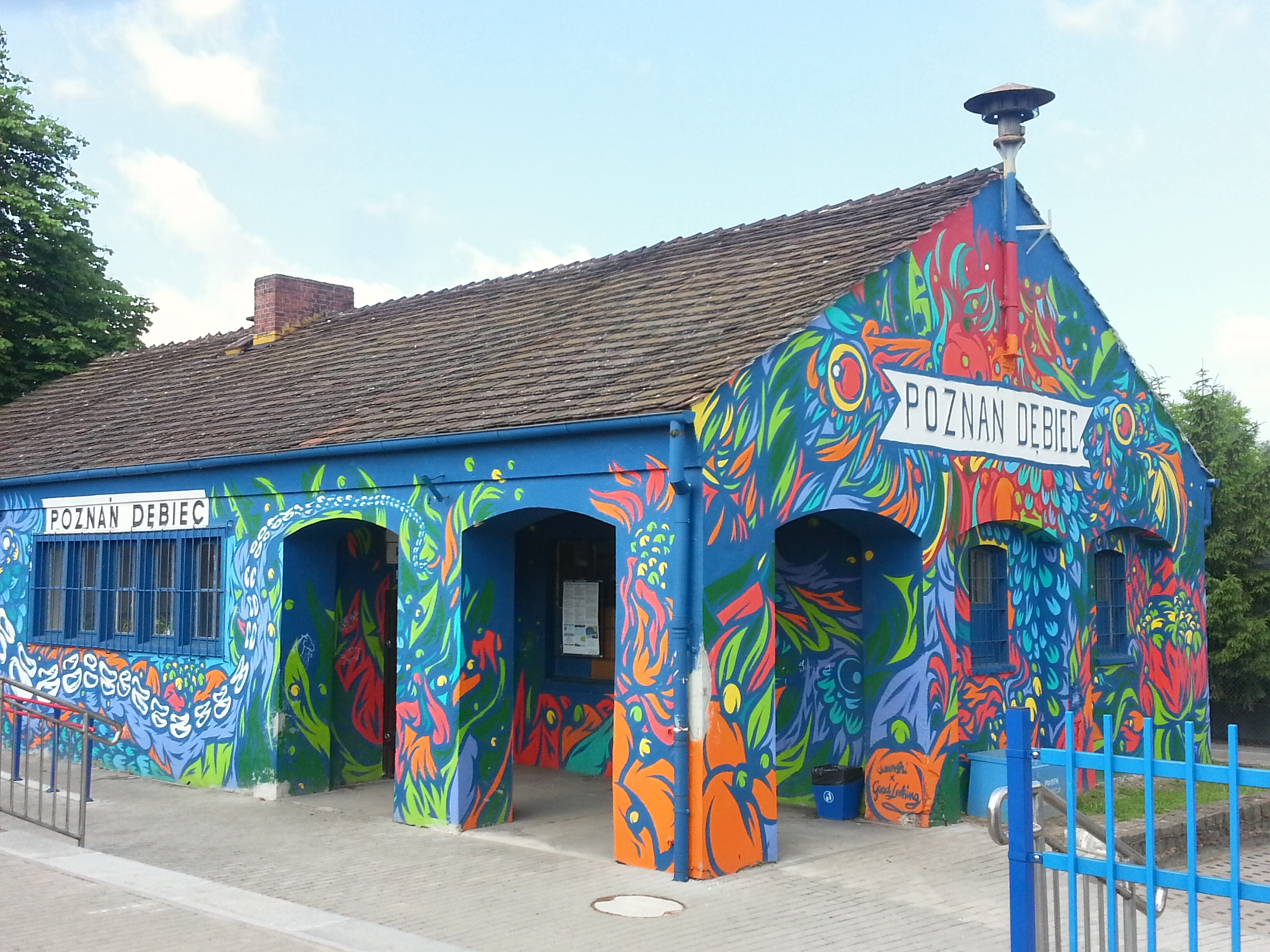
- Poznań Dębiec railway station

General information
- Location: Poznań, Greater Poland Voivodeship; Poland
- System: Railway Station
- Operator: Polregio; Greater Poland Railways
- Line: Wrocław–Poznań railway
- Platforms: 2

History
- Opened: 1856; 170 years ago

Services
Preceding station	Polregio	Following station
Poznań Główny Terminus	PR	Luboń koło Poznania towards Wrocław Główny
Preceding station	KW	Following station
Poznań Główny Terminus	Poznań - Wolsztyn	Luboń koło Poznania towards Wolsztyn
Poznań Główny Terminus	Poznań - Rawicz	Luboń koło Poznania towards Rawicz
Preceding station	Poznań Metropolitan Railway	Following station
Luboń koło Poznania towards Kościan	PKM1	Poznań Główny railway station towards Gniezno
Luboń koło Poznania towards Grodzisk Wielkopolski	PKM3	Poznań Główny railway station towards Wągrowiec
Location
- Location within Poland Location within Greater Poland Voivodeship

Poznań Dębiec railway station is a railway station serving the south of the city of Poznań, in the Greater Poland Voivodeship, Poland. The station is located on the Wrocław–Poznań railway. The train services are operated by Polregio and Greater Poland Railways.

== Train services ==
The station is served by the following service(s):

- Regional services (R) Wroclaw - Leszno - Poznan
- Regional services (KW) Wolsztyn - Grodzisk Wielkopolski - Poznan
