= Lubusz Regional Railway =

Former Polish regional railway operator

- Native name: Lubuska Kolej Regionalna
- Type: Private
- Founded: 1991
- Defunct: 1997
- Headquarters: 1 Ludowa Street, Zielona Góra, Poland
- Number of employees: 59 (1993)

Lubusz Regional Railway (Polish: Lubuska Kolej Regionalna) was the first Polish regional railway operator. Established in 1991 in Zielona Góra, the company was formally incorporated a year later by order of the Minister of Transport and Marine Economy. Its primary purpose was to operate passenger services on unprofitable railway lines abandoned by the Polish State Railways.

Operations began in 1993 using rolling stock imported from Denmark. Although there were plans to expand into freight transport, financial difficulties led to the company's closure in 1994. The liquidation process continued for the next three years.

== History ==
=== Origins ===
At the beginning of the 1990s, the Polish railway network faced a budget deficit, leading to the elimination of unprofitable passenger routes. On 14 May 1991, the Council of Ministers passed Resolution No. 70, listing sections of the Polish State Railways network scheduled for full closure on 1 July. On 10 July 1991, Polish State Railways' General Director, Aleksander Janiszewski, sent a letter to provincial governors informing them of these closures. He also proposed transferring the abandoned railway lines to alternative operators – private companies, industrial enterprises, or non-public railways – although the specifics of asset ownership transfer were not defined.

In the Zielona Góra Voivodeship, 20 railway sections with a total length of 470 km were marked for closure, which would have left large parts of the region without rail connections. In response, on 19 July 1991, Deputy Voivode T. Bobiecki met with local government representatives and Zdzisław Wolny, the Director of the Zielona Góra Regional Transport Division. During the meeting, the idea of establishing a regional railway to operate on the abandoned lines was proposed. The Regional Transport Division and the Infrastructure Department of the Voivodeship Office were tasked with conducting a technical and economic feasibility study for the project.

To explore the concept of regional railways, Zielona Góra officials examined Denmark's system. Danish representatives expressed interest in cooperation and offered assistance. Negotiations led to the opportunity to purchase 10 diesel multiple units from DSB. The final deal, approved by the Danish parliament, allowed the Polish side to acquire 10 powered railcars, 29 passenger coaches, and 40 spare parts wagons for 47,000 Danish kroner (equivalent to 1.5 billion old PLN).

=== Beginnings of the company ===
In the second half of September 1991, the Self-Government Assembly of the Zielona Góra Voivodeship supported the idea of establishing the Lubuska Kolej Regionalna, after which the company agreement for Lubuska Kolej Regionalna was signed in a notary office. On 4 October 1991, the company was registered at the District Court in Zielona Góra. Its headquarters were located in Zielona Góra at 1 Ludowa Street, with Tadeusz Tomczak appointed as its president. The company's shareholding structure was as follows:

- 326 shares (98.79%) – State Treasury represented by the Voivode of Zielona Góra,
- 2 shares (0.61%) – Danish company Antodele, a subsidiary of DSB,
- 1 share (0.30%) – local government of Gmina Jasień,
- 1 share (0.30%) – local government of Gmina Sulechów.

As a result of negotiations between the Polish State Railways, the Lubuska Kolej Regionalna management, and regional authorities, the railway lines to be transferred to the new carrier were selected. On 4 March 1992, the area of operations of the company was defined, which included 277 km of track. The following sections were transferred to Lubuska Kolej Regionalna:

- Toporów–Sieniawa,
- Sulechów–Świebodzin (closed due to poor technical condition),
- Sulechów–Konotop (closed due to poor technical condition),
- Sulechów–Wolsztyn,
- Wolsztyn–Nowa Sól (best technical condition among the transferred sections),
- Kożuchów–Niegosławice,
- Stary Raduszec–Lubsko and Lubsko–Tuplice (closed due to poor technical condition),
- Lipinki–Kolsko.

At the same time, Lubuska Kolej Regionalna was allowed to operate trains on the following sections of the Polish State Railways:

- Zbąszyń–Zbąszynek,
- Świebodzin–Toporów,
- Leszno–Zbąszyń,
- Wolsztyn–Luboń–Poznań,
- Zbąszynek–Czerwieńsk–Gubin,
- Zielona Góra–Żary,
- Nowa Sól–Żagań,
- Żagań–Jasień–Gubin,
- Nowa Sól–Czerwieńsk,
- Niegosławice–Tuplice,
- Tuplice–Łęknica,
- Jankowa Żagańska–Sanice,
- Żagań–Jankowa Żagańska,
- Żary–Jankowa Żagańska.

On 16 March 1992, in Zielona Góra, the first two sets of DSB trains for Lubuska Kolej Regionalna were ceremoniously handed over. In July, the carrier was exempted from tolls for using Polish State Railways tracks. On 5 October, after further efforts by Lubuska Kolej Regionalna, the general director of Polish State Railways transferred the Tuplice–Łęknica and additionally the Jankowa Żagańska–Sanice sections to the carrier. On 8 October, the Minister of Transport and Marine Economy signed Regulation No. 101, which established Lubuska Kolej Regionalna and recognized it as a public-use railway.

In December 1992, Lubuska Kolej Regionalna proposed general cooperation rules with Polish State Railways for freight transport. On behalf of the Polish State Railways, Lubuska Kolej Regionalna was to perform forwarding activities on its lines and bear the maintenance costs, for which it would receive an 8% commission from the transport charges for the entire journey of the shipment. In the second stage, Lubuska Kolej Regionalna planned to perform freight transport using its own locomotives and workforce. The company expected significant profit with a minimal increase in costs.

In 1993, Lubuska Kolej Regionalna entered into further agreements with the Polish State Railways. In January, timetables were agreed upon, and in March, a passenger transport agreement was signed. In April, part of the tracks and the warehouse and workshop premises in the Czerwieńsk motive power depot were handed over, and the process of approving the Danish rolling stock for operation started in Poznań. In May, procedures for dealing with accidents and failures were agreed upon.

=== Commencement of operations ===
On 23 May 1993, with the introduction of the new timetable, Lubuska Kolej Regionalna began passenger transport operations. Four of the five trains allowed for operation serviced passenger routes on the following lines:

- Wolsztyn–Sulechów,
- Wolsztyn–Czerwieńsk,
- Wolsztyn–Sława,
- Wolsztyn–Niegosławice,
- Sieniawa–Zielona Góra,
- Sieniawa–Zbąszynek,
- Nowa Sól–Sława Śląska,
- Nowa Sól–Żary,
- Tuplice–Łęknica,
- Żagań–Lubsko.

Additionally, on weekends, a long-distance train operated on the Czerwieńsk–Karpacz route. On weekdays, trains ran from 4:00 AM to 8:30 PM, while on weekends, the service was from 6:00 AM to 7:45 PM. There were also plans to launch connections from Zielona Góra and Gubin to Warsaw, for which the carrier was to receive an additional 10 cars from DSB.

At the time of launching services, the company employed 59 people, 12 of whom were part-time workers. Trains were operated by a two-person crew equipped with a radio for communication with stations. The duties of the train conductor included closing and opening the gates at level crossings, as Lubuska Kolej Regionalna did not employ flagmen. After stopping the train, the conductor would leave the train to close the gates, and once the train passed, the employee would open the barrier and return to the train. To improve the situation, DSB planned to donate several automatic barrier closing devices to Lubuska Kolej Regionalna. The train conductor was also responsible for serving passengers and managing printed tickets. Ticket sales mainly occurred onboard, as the company had only one ticket office at Zielona Góra station, and also a currency exchange office at the border crossing in Olszyna. When passengers transferred from a Lubuska Kolej Regionalna train to a Polish State Railways train, the Polish State Railways did not charge additional fees for issuing tickets.

=== Issues ===
On 25 May 1993, Lubuska Kolej Regionalna was scheduled to operate an additional train with a school trip from Zielona Góra to Żagań. However, due to the Polish State Railways' refusal to grant access to infrastructure, the carrier had to cancel the train and replace it with a substitute bus.

The process of Lubuska Kolej Regionalna taking ownership of railway infrastructure previously owned by the Polish State Railways proved problematic. Initially, it was planned that the entire infrastructure would be transferred to the State Treasury, and then only the parts related to the operation of the railway would be given to Lubuska Kolej Regionalna, while the rest would be transferred to municipalities and subsequently sold. Polish State Railways, however, believed that Lubuska Kolej Regionalna should take over all facilities, including railway housing and stations. Furthermore, Lubuska Kolej Regionalna's trains on main Polish State Railways lines could only depart after those of the state carrier. In July 1993, the two carriers agreed on a new timetable, and in November, the issue of Lubuska Kolej Regionalna being exempt from track access fees for the Polish State Railways lines was discussed again, along with the terms for the transfer of infrastructure.

Operating trains on local lines, designed for express traffic, turned out to be uneconomical. The train used 2 liters of diesel fuel per km, while a railbus of the SA101 series, produced in 1992 in Poznań, used only 0.2 liters of fuel on the same route. Refueling the Lubuska Kolej Regionalna train cost the company 14 million old PLN, while the revenue from the route covered only 2.5 million old PLN. Additionally, the rolling stock required expensive repairs, including the regeneration or replacement of parts.

The company's financing also became a problem. According to its founding concept, the company was supposed to be self-financing, but the core activity, which was passenger transport, was unprofitable despite a ministerial subsidy of approximately 10 billion old PLN in 1993. It became necessary to initiate profitable freight services, which Lubuska Kolej Regionalna had been seeking to start since December 1992. Exactly one year later, the carriers signed an agreement for freight transport.

=== Liquidation ===
Since the Polish State Railways operated the more important lines in the Zielona Góra region, Lubuska Kolej Regionalna had little significance in passenger transport. The occupancy of its trains did not exceed 12%. Moreover, the carrier ultimately did not receive permission from the Polish State Railways to operate freight services despite the agreement made in December 1993. The company faced the prospect of losses from operating peripheral passenger lines while also incurring costs related to maintaining infrastructure and facilities. The company carried about 150,000 passengers, generating a loss of 9 billion old PLN. As a result, in 1994, the regional governor decided to initiate the liquidation of the company, which had become a burden on the regional budget.

Passenger services were provided by Lubuska Kolej Regionalna until February 1994. In the summer timetable for that year, Lubuska Kolej Regionalna trains were listed as operating on announcement, but ultimately, no such services were launched.

On 8 July 1994, a liquidator was appointed for the company, and on 9 October, the carrier's rolling stock was put up for sale. The liquidation process continued until 1997, during which time the company, having received an additional 10 wagons for a symbolic fee, also sought EU funds and other assistance through DSB.

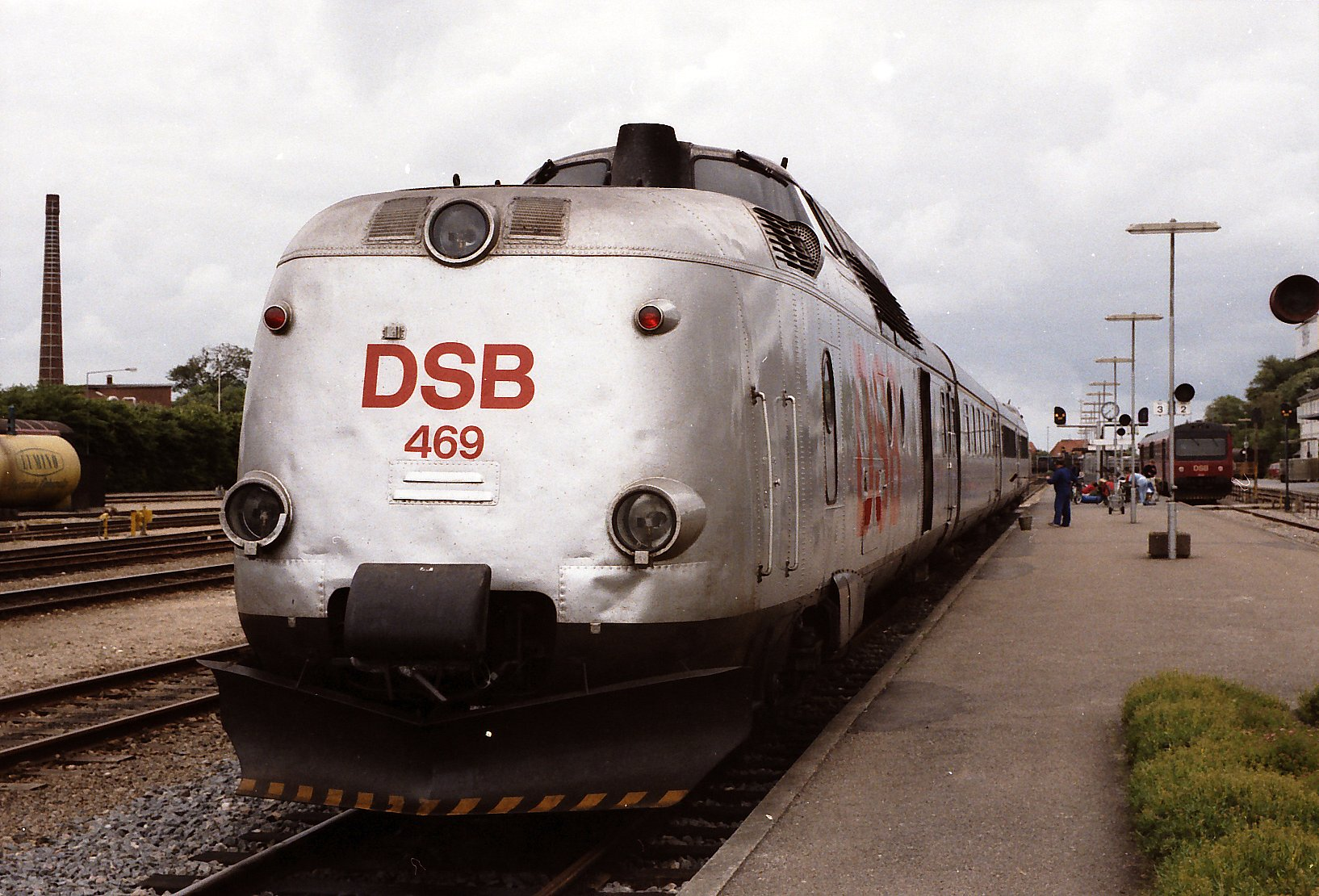
Railcar

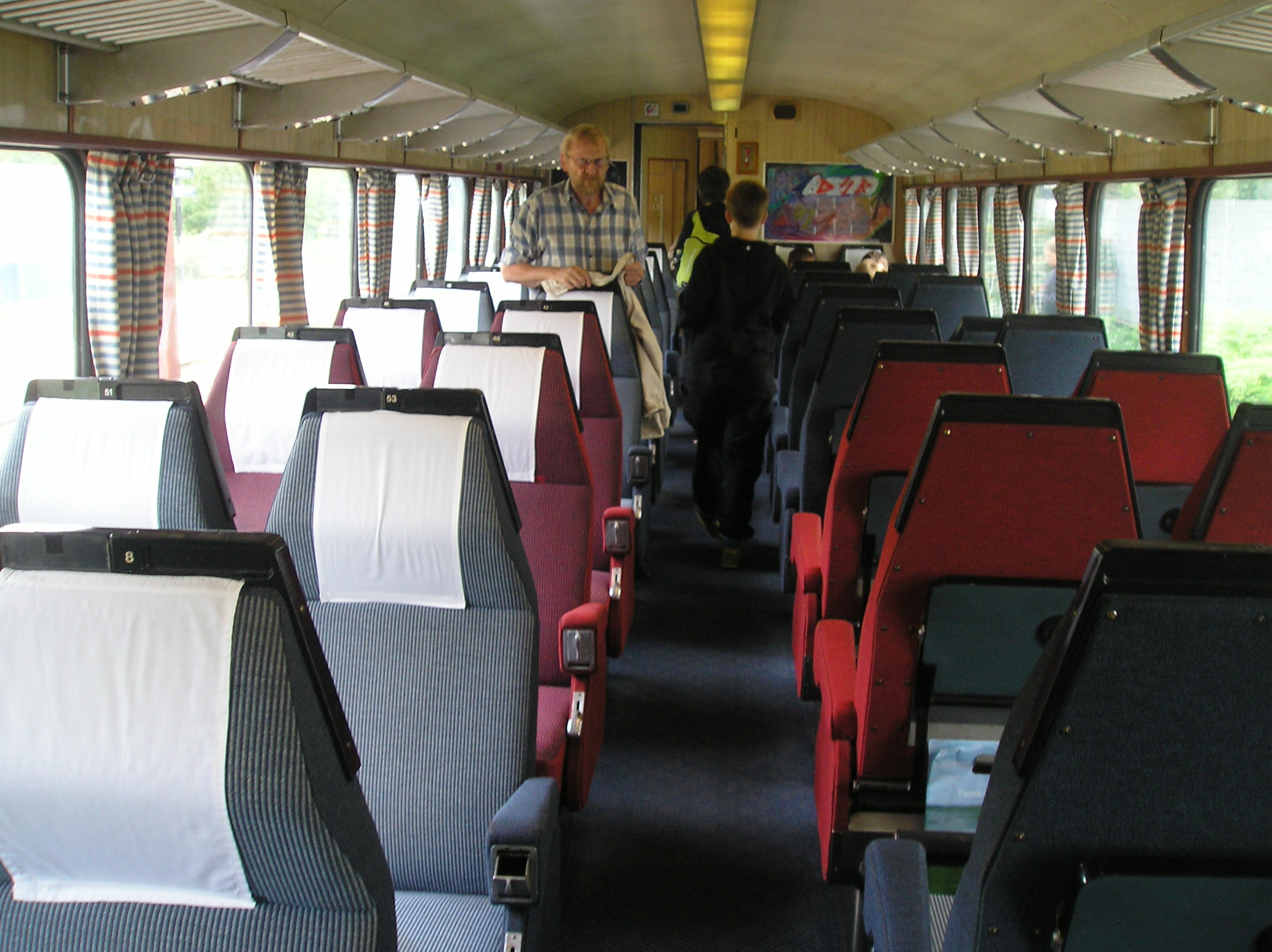
Interior of the control car

== Rolling stock ==
=== Rolling stock purchased by Lubuska Kolej Regionalna in 1991 ===
Series	Type of wagon	Numbers	Number of units	Length (mm)	Total length (mm)	Mass (t)	1st class seats	2nd class seats	Dining seats
MA	Railcar	461–470	10	19,200	19,960	51	–	–	–
BS	2nd class control car	481–489	9	18,300	19,000	29	–	47	–
AM	1st class passenger car	501–509	9	17,400	18,160	26	36	–	–
BM	2nd class passenger car	520–525	6	17,400	18,160	26	–	51	–
BMk	2nd class passenger car with buffet	531–535	5	17,400	18,160	28	–	40	16

Between 1963 and 1966, German factories MAN SE, Linke-Hofmann-Busch, and Waggonfabrik Wegmann produced 11 diesel multiple units for the Danish railways DSB. Each set consisted of a motorized coach of series MA, a 2nd class control car of series BS, and two passenger cars – 1st class AM or 2nd class BM, or sometimes a 2nd class BMk with a buffet. In Denmark, the four-car units were combined in pairs to form eight-car trains, with only one set in each pair having a buffet. These units were used until 1990 as intercity express trains called lyntog (Danish for "lightning train").

In the second half of 1991, Lubuska Kolej Regionalna purchased 39 cars from DSB, including 10 motorized coaches, allowing the formation of 10 trains. Five units were approved for operation in Poland, and four of them were used. Their expected lifespan was at least 15 years. These vehicles were considered among the more modern rolling stock in use in Poland at the time. They were equipped with airplane-style seats with adjustable backs, air conditioning, doors opened by pressing a button, a bar compartment, and a toilet with a changing table for infants, as well as hot and cold water. The units were stationed in the Czerwieńsk depot, which also housed their maintenance workshop. Due to their appearance, they were often called "silver arrows" or "cigars".

In the second half of 1994, the rolling stock owned by the company, which had been put into liquidation, was put up for sale. Some of the cars without homologation were scrapped at the company's cutting station in Żary, the functional motorized cars were cut into scrap at Lubsko railway station, and some of the remaining cars found alternative uses.
