= Poznań Metropolitan Railway =

Commuter rail operator in Poland

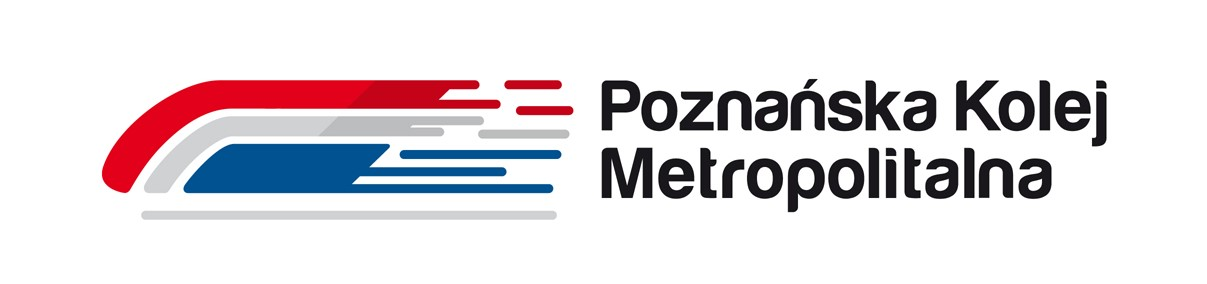

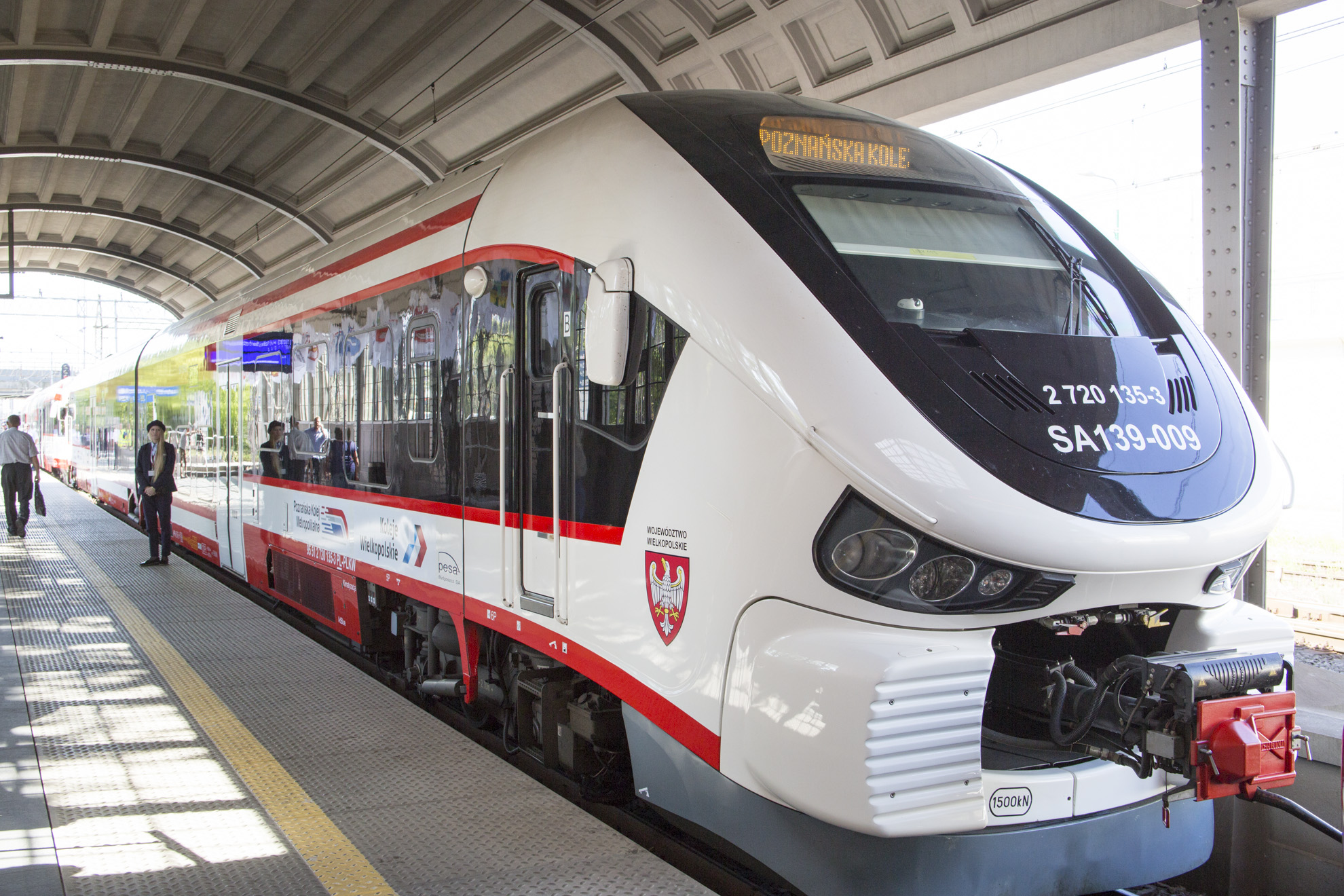
- Pesa Link SA139 in the Greater Poland Railways livery

Overview
- Native name: Poznańska Kolej Metropolitalna
- Owner: Greater Poland Voivodeship
- Locale: Poznań metropolitan area
- Transit type: Commuter rail
- Number of lines: 5

Operation
- Began operation: 10 June 2018; 8 years ago
- Operator(s): Greater Poland Railways

The Poznań Metropolitan Railway (Polish: Poznańska Kolej Metropolitalna; PKM) is a commuter rail line in the Poznań metropolitan area, operated by Greater Poland Railways.

== History ==
After a partnership agreement was signed by the city of Poznań, Greater Poland Voivodeship, Greater Poland Railways, Polish State Railways (PKP), and a further 24 local governments in November 2013, planning for the implementation of the Poznań Metropolitan Railway (PKM) began in February 2014. This plan included developing a concept for integrated public transport, the construction of interchanges, spatial development plans around the interchanges, renovating existing station facilities, and the introduction of passenger services on the Zieliniec–Kiekrz railway, which at the time only served freight trains.

The project was inaugurated on 25 May 2018. Services commenced on 10 June of that same year. The first four lines connect Grodzisk Wielkopolski, Jarocin, Nowy Tomyśl, and Wągrowiec with Poznań. On 9 September 2018, services started running to Swarzędz. During peak hours, services run every 30 minutes.

In 2020, services began running to Września, and then later to Rogoźno and Gniezno. In January 2022, PKM trains appeared on the route to Kościan. In June 2022, route PKM4 was shortened to terminate at Środa Wielkopolska due to Jarocin County's refusal to continue co-financing the PKM. In July of that same year, an agreement was signed with the authorities of Szamotuły County and the gminas along the Poznań–Szczecin railway (Poznań–Wronki section) for the running of PKM services on that section. The first services were intended to operate in mid-December 2022, however they were delayed to January 2023.

== Routes ==
Source: Rozklad jazdy [Timetable] – Poznań Metropolitan Railway (in Polish)

- PKM1 Rawicz – Leszno – Poznań – Gniezno – Mogilno
- PKM2 Kutno – Poznań – Zbąszynek
- PKM3 Wolsztyn – Poznań – Wągrowiec – Gołańcz
- PKM4 Wolsztyn – Poznań – Kępno
- PKM5 Poznań – Rogoźno
