= Kościan railway station =

Railway station in Kościan, Poland

Coordinates: 52.0791°N 16.6419°E

Kościan
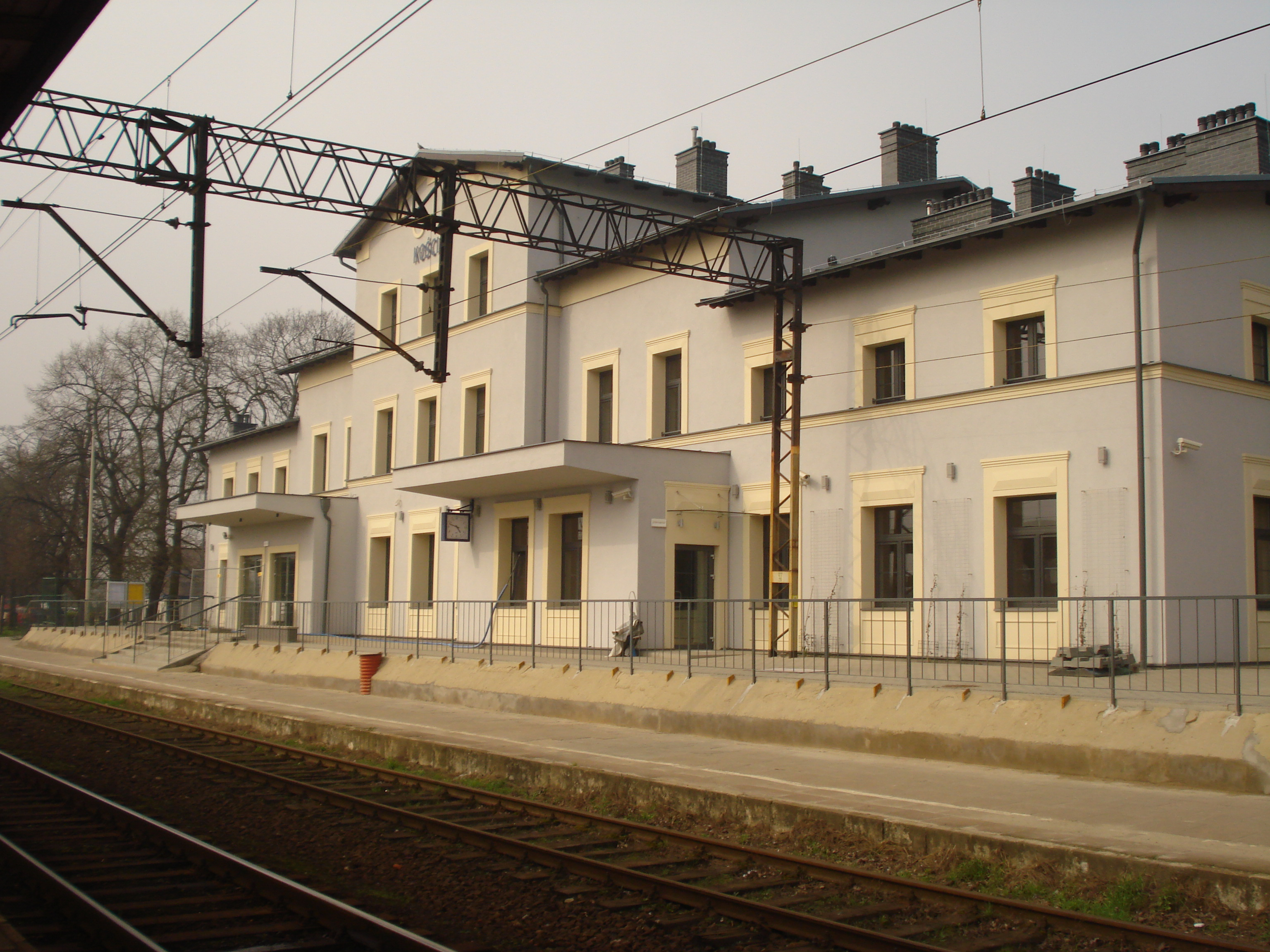
- Kościan railway station

General information
- Location: Kościan, Greater Poland Voivodeship; Poland
- System: Railway Station
- Operator: PKP; Polregio
- Lines: 271: Wrocław–Poznań railway; 366: Miejska Górka–Kościan railway (closed); 376: Kościan–Opalenica railway (closed)
- Platforms: 3
- Tracks: 7

History
- Opened: 1856; 170 years ago
- Rebuilt: 2013–2014
- Former names: Kosten

Services
| Preceding station | Polregio | Following station |
|---|---|---|
| Oborzyska Stare towards Poznań Główny | PR | Przysieka Stara towards Wrocław Główny |
| Preceding station | KW | Following station |
| Oborzyska Stare towards Poznań Główny | Poznań - Rawicz | Przysieka Stara towards Rawicz |
| Preceding station | Poznań Metropolitan Railway | Following station |
| Terminus | PKM1 | Oborzyska Stare towards Gniezno |
Location
- Location within Poland

Kościan railway station is a railway station serving the town of Kościan, in the Greater Poland Voivodeship, Poland. The station opened in 1856 and is located on the Wrocław–Poznań railway. The train services are operated by PKP and Polregio.

== Train services ==
The station is served by the following services:

- Intercity services Swinoujscie - Szczecin - Stargard - Krzyz - Poznan - Leszno - Wroclaw - Opole - Katowice - Krakow - Rzeszow - Przemysl
- Intercity services Gorzow Wielkopolski - Krzyz - Poznan - Leszno - Wroclaw - Opole - Katowice - Krakow
- Intercity services Slupsk - Koszalin / Kolobrzeg - Pila - Poznan - Wroclaw - Opole - Katowice
- Intercity services Slupsk - Koszalin / Kolobrzeg - Pila - Poznan - Wroclaw - Opole - Czestochowa - Krakow - Rzeszow - Zamosc/Przemysl
- Intercity services Slupsk - Koszalin / Kolobrzeg - Pila - Poznan - Wroclaw - Opole - Bielsko-Biala
- Intercity services Gdynia - Gdansk - Bydgoszcz - Poznan - Leszno - Wroclaw - Opole - Katowice
- Intercity services Bialystok - Elk - Olsztyn - Ilawa - Torun - Poznan - Leszno - Wroclaw
- Regional services (R) Poznan - Koscian - Leszno - Zmigrod - Wroclaw
