= Leszno railway station =

Railway station in Leszno, Poland

Coordinates: 51.8469°N 16.5656°E

Leszno
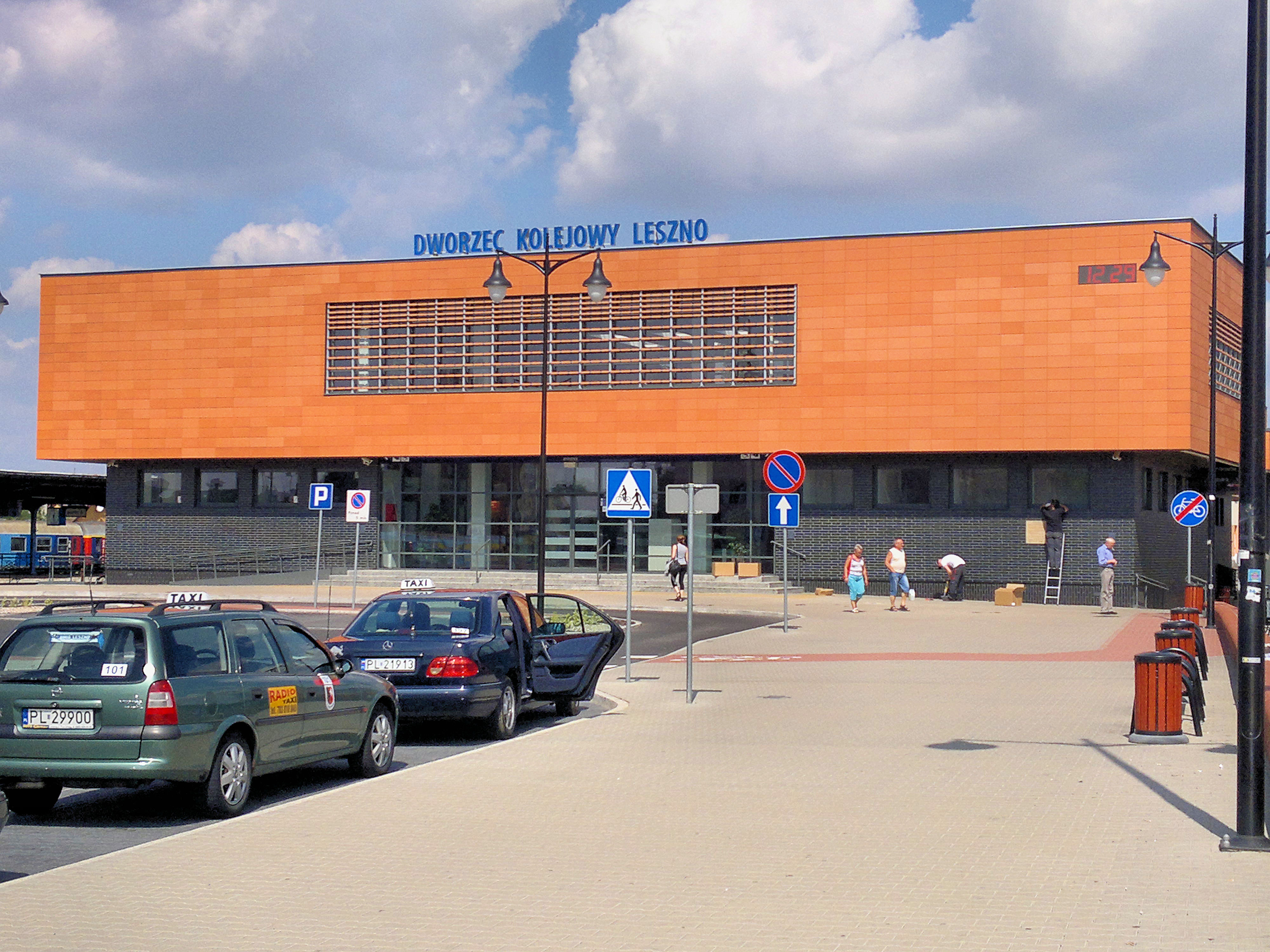
- Leszno railway station

General information
- Location: Leszno, Greater Poland Voivodeship; Poland
- System: Railway Station
- Operator: PKP Polskie Linie Kolejowe
- Lines: 14: Łódź-Forst (Lausitz) railway 271: Wrocław–Poznań railway 359 Leszno–Zbąszyń railway
- Platforms: 8

History
- Opened: 1856; 170 years ago
- Rebuilt: 1899, 1971, 2012

Services
Preceding station	Polregio	Following station
Lipno Nowe towards Poznań Główny	PR	Rydzyna towards Wrocław Główny
Terminus	PR	Lasocice towards Głogów
Preceding station	KW	Following station
Lipno Nowe towards Poznań Główny	Poznań - Rawicz	Rydzyna towards Rawicz
Terminus	Leszno - Zbąszynek	Wilkowice towards Zbąszynek
Terminus	Leszno - Ostrów Wlkp.	Kąkolewo towards Ostrów Wielkopolski
Location
- Location within Poland

Leszno railway station is a railway station serving the town of Leszno, in the Greater Poland Voivodeship, Poland. The station opened in 1856 and is located on the Łódź–Forst (Lausitz) railway, Wrocław–Poznań railway and Leszno–Zbąszyń railway. The train services are operated by PKP, Polregio and Greater Poland Railways.

== History ==
In 1853 a decision was made to build a railway line connecting Wrocław with Poznań. It obtained the concession for the construction Upper Silesian Railway (Oberschlesische Eisenbahn Gesellschaft), and construction started in Leszno, in three directions: to Wrocław, Poznań and Głogów. A prototype steam locomotive entered Leszno station from Rawicz on 27 September 1856, and the first regular train service started on 27 October 1856. The ceremonial opening of the line, involving city authorities and residents, took place 29 October 1856. On 1 December 1857, the 45 km line Glogau was opened. After the end of World War I, the railway between Wschowa and Lasocice became a border crossing between Poland and Germany. From April to June 1919 the line from Głogów to Leszno transported many soldiers of General Haller travelling from France (among others, via Zagan) into Polish territory.

The connection between Leszno and Ostrow Wielkopolski and Jarocin opened on 1 October 1888. Another line was the route to Włoszakowice, opened on 1 October 1, 1895 and subsequently extended to Wolsztyn and Zbąszynek in 1896. Construction was completed in 1904.

On 15 September 1916 the 60-kilometer line from Leszno to Krzelów railway opened. It followed the Wrocław - Poznań railway in a southerly direction from the now closed Leszno Dworzec Mały railway station and Leszno Zaborowo railway station. After blowing up the bridge at Kopanica during the Greater Poland Uprising the railway line became impassable. On 17 January 1920 Leszno - Laskowa was taken out of use and in 1922 dismantled.

In the interwar period, Leszno station served as a border control station. On the railway line between Leszno and Głogów there were 2 pairs of international passenger trains (without stopping in Lasocicach, border control station in Leszno), and 3 pairs of trains to the border at Lasocice dojeżdżały from Leszno. The same thing happened on the railway line No. 271. Here the border was on the line of today's border of Greater Poland Voivodeship and Lower Silesia Voivodeship. The train service was limited to 2 passenger trains and express train 801/802 between Wroclaw and Gdańsk. From Poznan, two passenger trains reached Rawicz. Just as the railway line No. 14, the station Leszno was a border control station.

Electrification of the lines around Leszno took place in three stages:

- 31 May 1969: - Poznań - Puszczykowko
- 20 December 1969: Puszczykowko - Leszno
- 22 April 1970: Leszno - Wrocław

Prior to the construction of Poznań Franowo freight yard, Leszno served as a marshalling yard for Poznań.

== Modernisation ==
The station was a finalist in the Modernization of the Year 2011 awards, as an example of an object built in the 1970s, which after modernisation gained a new facade.

== Train services ==
The station is served by the following services:

- Intercity services Swinoujscie - Szczecin - Stargard - Krzyz - Poznan - Leszno - Wroclaw - Opole - Katowice - Krakow - Rzeszow - Przemysl
- Intercity services Slupsk - Koszalin / Kolobrzeg - Pila - Poznan - Wroclaw - Opole - Czestochowa - Krakow - Rzeszow - Zamosc/Przemysl
- Intercity services Slupsk - Koszalin / Kolobrzeg - Pila - Poznan - Wroclaw - Opole - Bielsko-Biala
- Intercity services Gdynia - Gdansk - Bydgoszcz - Poznan - Leszno - Wroclaw
- Intercity services Bialystok - Elk - Olsztyn - Ilawa - Torun - Poznan - Leszno - Wroclaw
- Regional services (R) Poznan - Koscian - Leszno - Zmigrod - Wroclaw
- Regional services (KW) Zbaszynek - Zbaszyn - Wolsztyn - Boszkowo - Leszno
- Regional services (KW) Leszno - Ostrow Wielkopolski
