= Gniezno locomotive depot =

Locomotive depot in Poland

Coordinates: 52°30′N 17°36′E

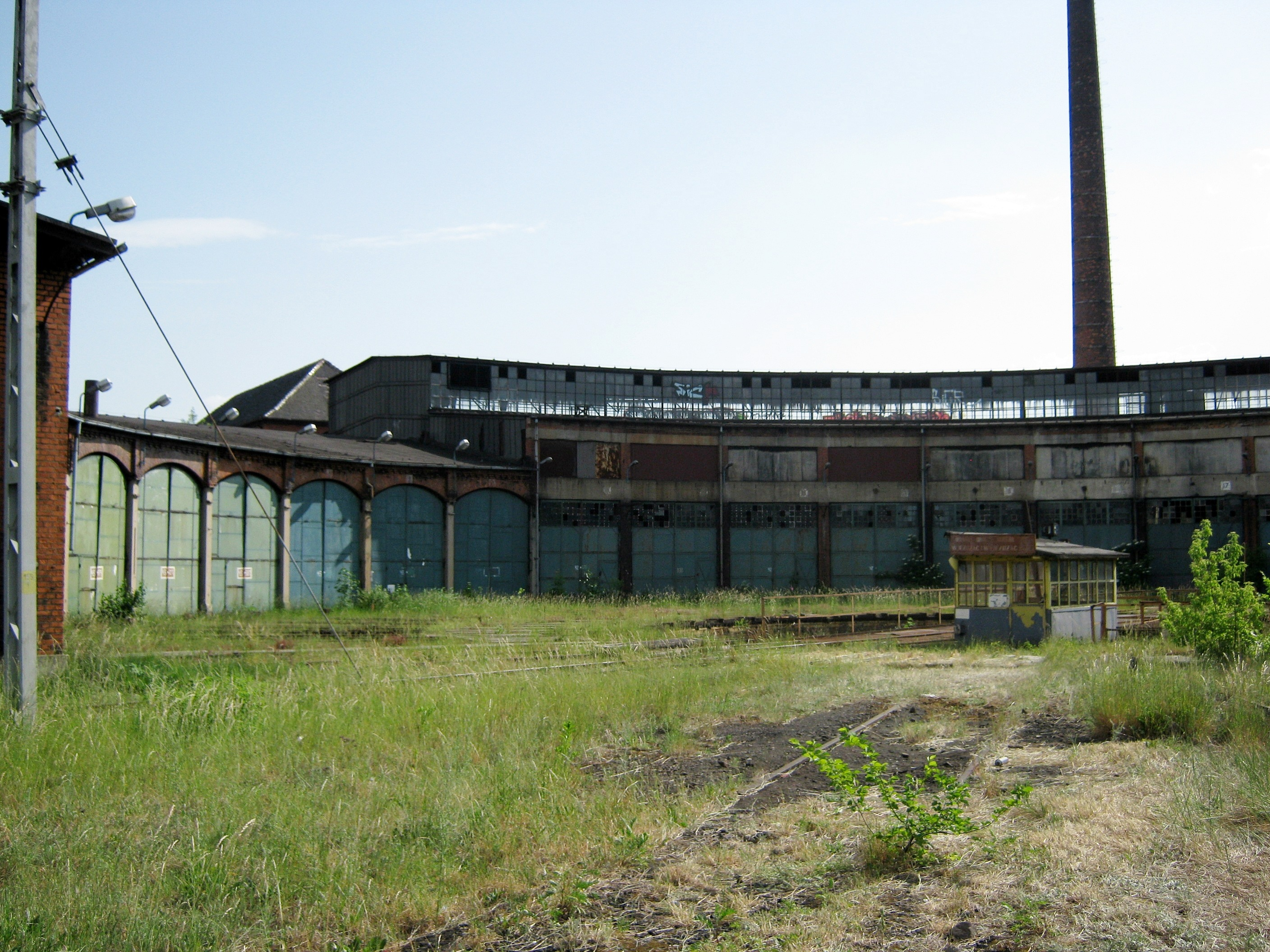
- Depot and turntable
- Interactive map of Gniezno locomotive depot

Location
- Location: Gniezno, Greater Poland Voivodeship, Poland

Characteristics
- Owner: Polish State Railways

History
- Opened: 1872
- Original: Upper Silesian Railway

The Gniezno locomotive depot (Polish: Parowozownia Gniezno) is a 19th-century railway depot and historical monument in the town of Gniezno, Greater Poland Voivodeship, Poland. It was built in 1875 in the area adjacent to the newly built Gniezno railway station in 1872, which became an important point in the Poznań-Toruń transport hub. With the railway infrastructure built around it, it creates a complex unique on a European scale. The depot was decommissioned in 2009 and later abandoned when the repairs to the rolling stock were moved from Gniezno to Leszno. It now operates only as a heritage tourist attraction.

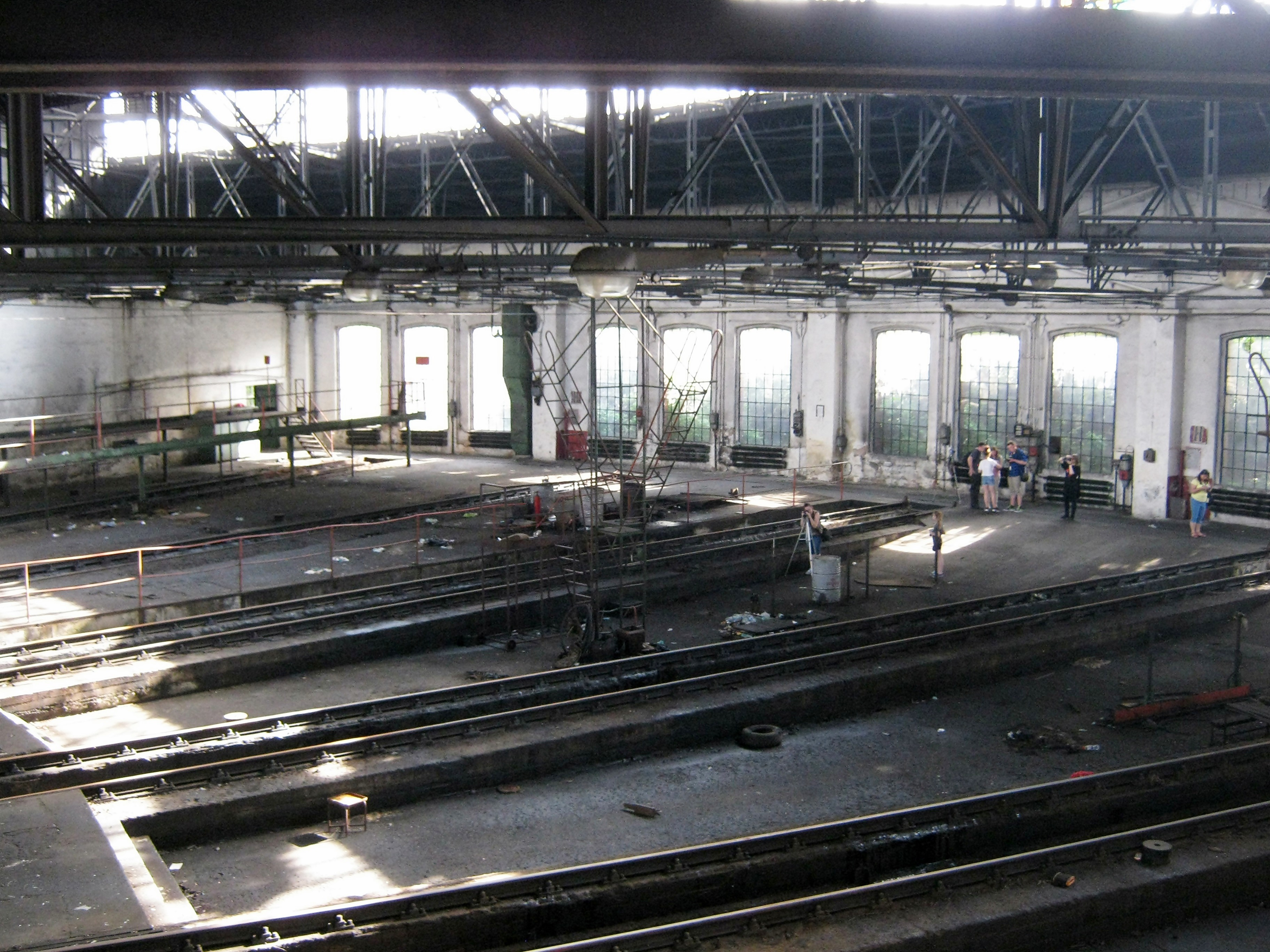
Roundhouse interior

== History ==
The history of the Gniezno locomotive depot is associated with the construction of the railway line from Poznań to Toruń at the turn of the 1860s and 1870s. Thanks to many years of efforts, on November 30, 1867, a representative of the Ministry of Trade, Industry and Public Works signed an agreement with representatives of the Upper Silesian Railway regarding the construction of a railway with Poznań through Gniezno and Inowrocław to Toruń with a branch to Bydgoszcz. On 26 May 1872, the ceremonial opening of the line from Poznań to Bydgoszcz via Gniezno took place, and on 25 March 1873 it was opened to Toruń.

Gniezno station is located 50 kilometres (31 mi) along line from Poznań to Toruń. It was located on the southern side of the city, in its then suburbs. The most impressive building of the main station was then built in the very centre of the complex, in addition to which a freight warehouse, a locomotive shed hall with a fan-shaped room for four steam locomotives with a turntable, a water station and residential buildings for railway officials were built at the site.

The locomotive shed was built in several phases. In the initial period, there were two locomotive depots: the older one from 1872, built during the construction of the Poznań-Toruń/Bydgoszcz line, and the younger one from 1875, connected with the Gniezno-Oleśnica line. The first one was closed at the beginning of the 20th century during a thorough reconstruction of the station, when the Prussian Railways, after the nationalization of both lines, decided to keep and expand the second one. Before World War I, a water tower, a night shelter and a second fan hall, located west of the older one, were built in the locomotive shed. In the years 1914–1918, in the area adjacent to the locomotive shed, a road viaduct was built over the railway line, spatially enclosing the station on the western side.

The locomotive shed was seriously damaged in September 1939 as a result of bombing by German forces. The bombs damaged the roof of the facility positions from 1875 along with the extension. After the Germans occupied Gniezno, the locomotive shed was thoroughly renovated and quickly restored to operation. In the 1940s, a large-scale expansion of the station in Gniezno was undertaken, which included the construction of: 14 new positions in the western fan hall with a ventilation chimney in the locomotive shed; central heating boiler room (with a special track for transporting coal); combustion power plant with switchgear and transformer station; locomotive control room (designed individually for Gniezno); material and oil storage in the wagon house; a technical line for steam locomotives with coal fences and cranes; wagon workshops; mechanical workshops; and a crane hall.

In the post-war period, investments included the construction of a staff social building with an instruction room in the 1960s (clearly different architecturally) and the adaptation of part of the fan hall to operate electric locomotives. Two entrance tracks to the younger fan hall (including the track under the control room) have been electrified.

Since the end of the 1980s, the locomotive depot limited its operations due to the reduction of regional connections. The traction part was closed at the beginning of the 21st century, the rolling stock repair plant in 2009, and the wagon shed in 2012. Since its closure, the locomotive shed has been transformed into a tourist attraction.

The future of the locomotive shed is the subject of a social debate in Gniezno, which was sparked by PKP's plans to change the function of the locomotive shed into a shopping centre. The resistance of the local community and conservationists and the lack of funds for this purpose prevented the destruction of the technical heritage in the locomotive depot.

In 2010, Miron Urbaniak published a book entitled "The Historic Gniezno Railway Station", which describes the history of Gniezno station and the locomotive shed.

== Cultural property ==
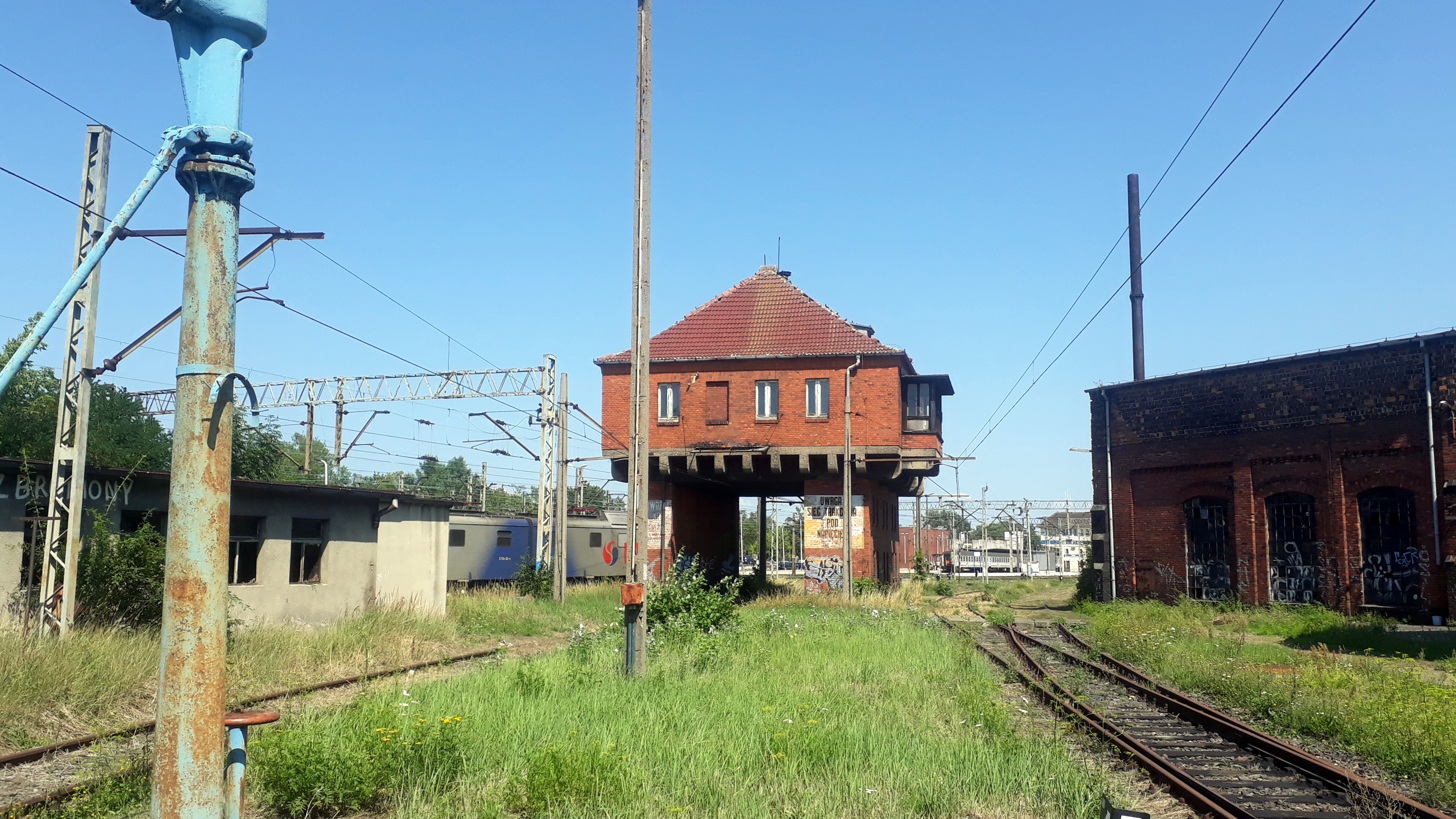
Control room

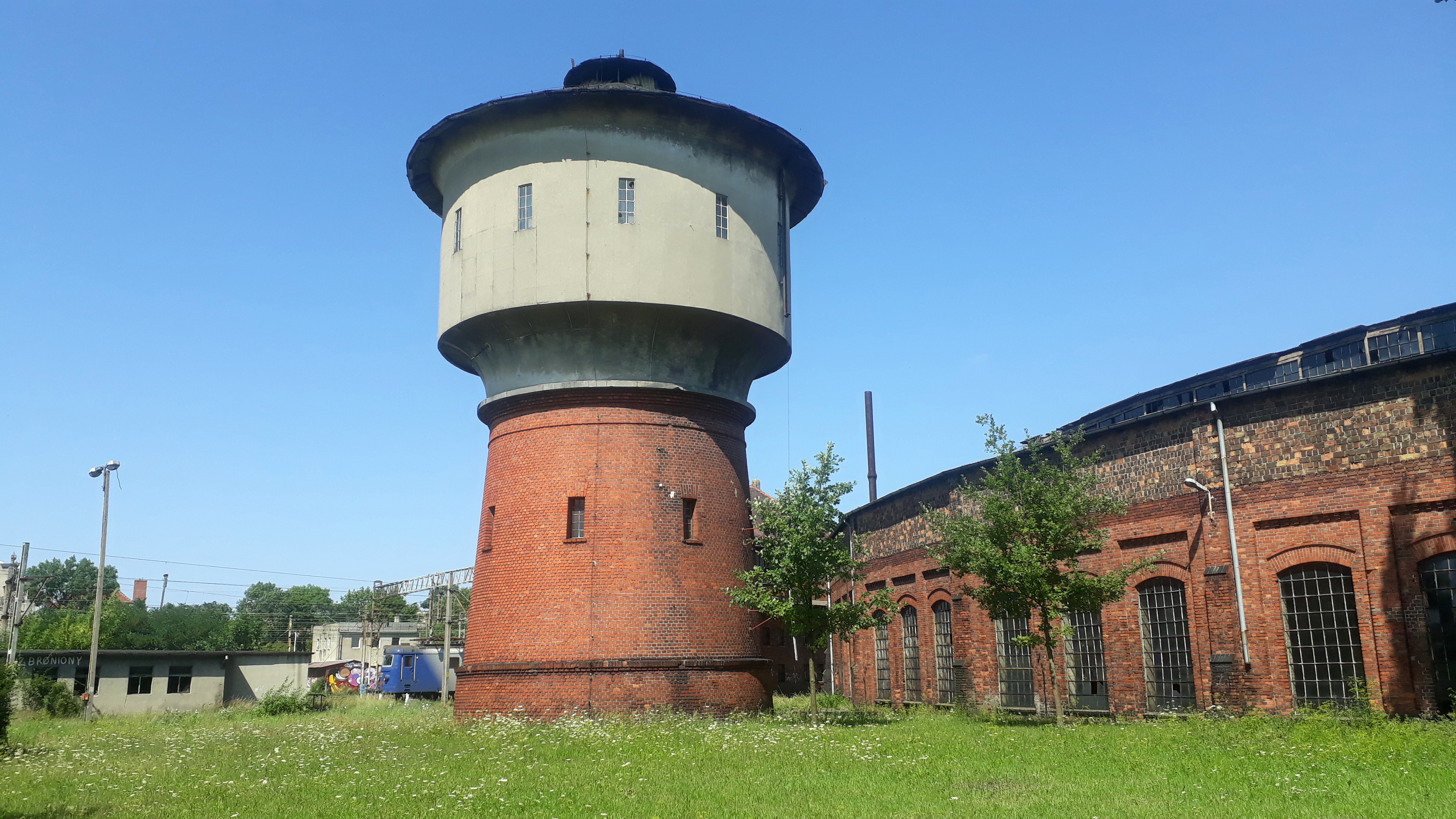
Water tower by the roundhouse

The following items at are listed by Poland's National Institute of Cultural Heritage on the Registry of Cultural Property:

- wooden coal crane – the only one in Europe
- gate control room from around 1942
- turntable from the 1890s, rebuilt in the first half 20th century
- water tower from around 1905
- the fan locomotive shed with workshops from 1875, rebuilt in 1888, 1894–1895, 1914, 1922 and 1940 with 23 stalls, and the fan locomotive shed with a locomotive repair hall and workshops from 1908 to 1910, rebuilt around 1915 and 1941–1942, which has 24 stands, which gives a total of 47 stands, which makes it the largest fan hall in Europe
- night shelter from 1898 to 1899, rebuilt in 1913–1914 and 1940–1941
- warehouse from 1941 to 1942, rebuilt around 1944
- central heating boiler room from 1941 to 1942
- diesel power plant with switchboard and transformer from 1941 to 1942
- material and oil warehouse from 1942 to 1943
- a set of technical equipment for steam locomotives from 1941 to 1943
- wagon shed from 1941 to 1942

== Locomotives ==
In its heyday, the Gniezno locomotive shed operated several dozen steam locomotives. The series used include:

- Passenger: Ok1, Ok22, Ol49
- Freight: Ty1, Ty23, Ty2/Ty42, Ty3/Ty43, Ty45, TKi3, Tp3, Tp4, TKt48
- Express: Pd5
- Narrow-gauge (used on the Gniezno Narrow Gauge Railway): Tx1, Tx5, Txb5, Tx23, Tx28, Tw1, Py1, Px2, Px27, Px29, Px48

The locomotive shed also operated diesel locomotives (standard and narrow gauge) and electric:

- Standard gauge diesel: SM03, SM42, ST43, ST44, SP45
- Narrow gauge diesel: Lyd1, Lxd2
- Electric: ET22

== Tourism ==
Since 2015, the locomotive shed has been made available to tourists by the Gniezno Roundhouse Association. The tourist route includes a passage among the most important buildings of the complex, as well as the entrance to the fan hall, where a historical exhibition has been arranged.

Since 2010, the steam locomotive shed has been hosting "Steam Days" in May, which aim to popularize the history of the facility. The main event of the program is a guided tour of the locomotive shed, which is visited by several thousand people every year. The event also includes performances, cinema screenings, concerts, lectures, shows and special train rides. In 2010, a contemporary music festival was organized in the locomotive shed entitled CanDID Audiovisual Festival 2010.

== See also ==
- Gniezno railway station
