= Greater Poland Railways =

Regional rail operator in Greater Poland Voivodeship in Poland

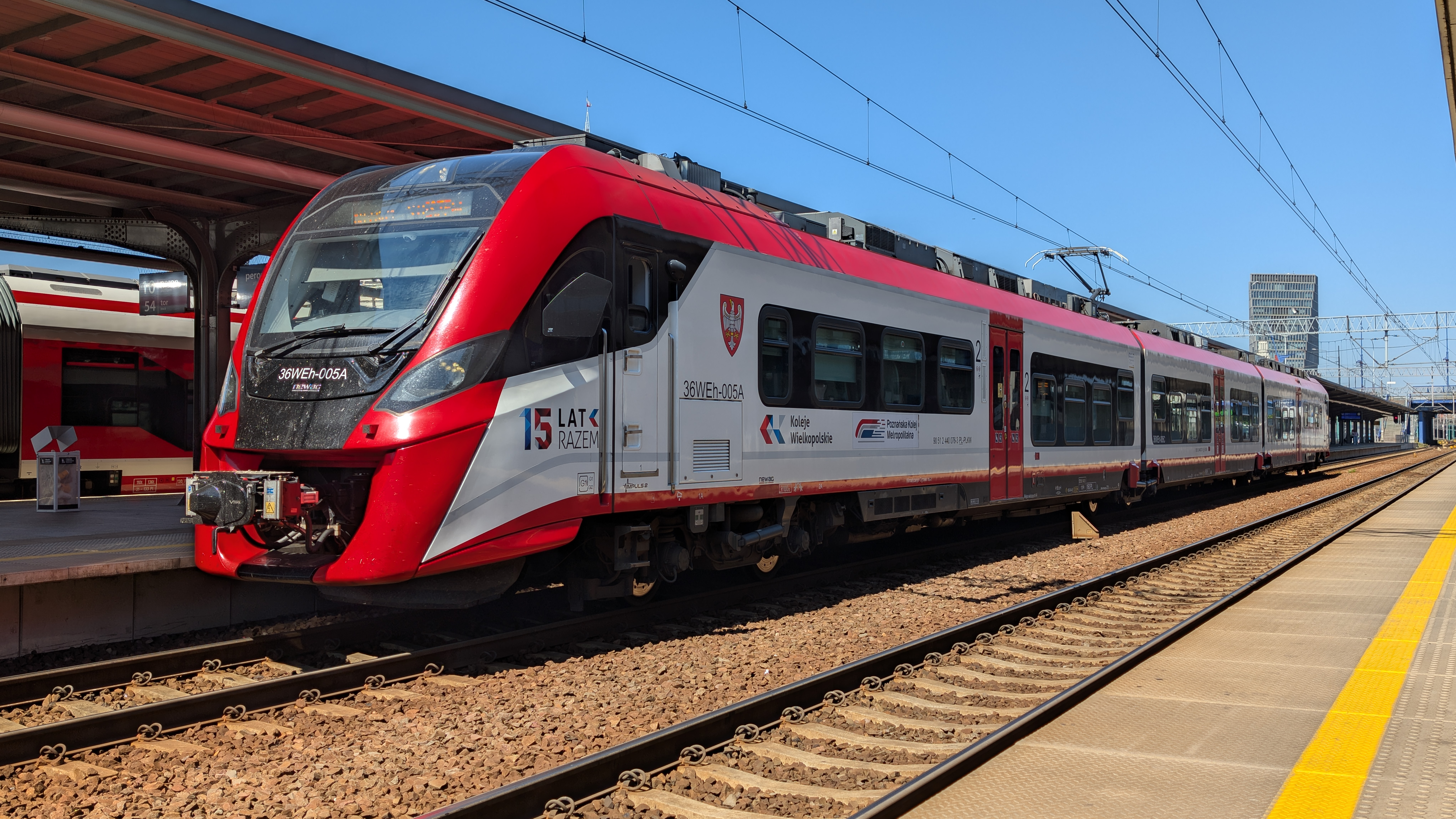
- Newag Impuls 36WEh at Poznań Główny
- Native name: Koleje Wielkopolskie
- Type: Ltd.
- Industry: Rail transport
- Founded: 28 September 2009
- Headquarters: Poznań, Poland
- Area served: Greater Poland Voivodeship
- Key people: Marek Nitkowski (president)
- Owner: Greater Poland Voivodeship
- Website: Official website

Greater Poland Railways (Polish: Koleje Wielkopolskie; KW) are a regional rail operator in the Greater Poland Voivodeship of Poland. The company was founded on 28 September 2009 and is fully owned by the regional government. KW began regular passenger services on 1 June 2011.

== Routes ==
Source: Liniowe rozkłady jazdy (in Polish)

- Poznań Główny – Kutno
- Poznań Główny – Mogilno
- Poznań Główny – Gołańcz
- Poznań Główny – Piła Główna
- Piła - Wyrzysk Osiek
- Poznań Główny – Krzyż
- Poznań Główny – Zbąszynek
- Poznań Główny – Wolsztyn
- Leszno – Zbąszynek
- Poznań Główny – Rawicz
- Leszno – Ostrów Wielkopolski
- Poznań Główny – Milicz
- Poznań Główny – Odolanów
- Poznań Główny – Kępno
- Poznań Główny – Łódź Kaliska
- Poznań Główny – Kalisz
- Gniezno – Krotoszyn

Some parts of the routes are jointly operated with the Poznań Metropolitan Railway.

== Rolling stock ==
| Class | Image | Cars per unit | Type | Top speed | | Number | Builder | Built |
| Class | Image | Cars per unit | Type | km/h | mph | Number | Builder | Built |
|---|---|---|---|---|---|---|---|---|
| EN57 | | 3 | Electric multiple unit | 120 | 75 | 7 | Pafawag | 1974–1975, 1981–1982 |
| EN57AL | | 3 | Electric multiple unit | 120 | 75 | 5 | Pafawag | 1974–1975, 1977, 1990 |
| EN76 | | 4 | Electric multiple unit | 160 | 99 | 22 | Pesa | 2012–2014 |
| 48WE | | 4 | Electric multiple unit | 160 | 99 | 10 | Pesa | 2019–2020 |
| 48WEb | | 4 | Electric multiple unit | 160 | 99 | 5 | Pesa | 2020–2021 |
| SA105 | | 1 | Diesel multiple unit | 120 | 75 | 2 | ZNTK Poznań | 2002 |
| SA108 | | 2 | Diesel multiple unit | 100 | 62 | 4 | ZNTK Poznań | 2003 |
| SA132 | | 2 | Diesel multiple unit | 140 | 87 | 10 | Pesa | 2005–2007 |
| SA134 | | 2 | Diesel multiple unit | 120 | 75 | 2 | Pesa | 2008 |
| SA139 | | 2 | Diesel multiple unit | 120 | 75 | 3 | Pesa | 2015 |
| 36WEhd | | 3 | Diesel multiple unit | 120 | 75 | 6 | Newag | 2020–2022 |

== Accidents and incidents ==
- On 25 May 2026, at around 15:13 CET, a Greater Poland Railways EN57AKW train, unit 1025 collided into the side of a lorry at an unguarded level crossing in Garbatka, (Note: It was reported that the lorry originally stopped at a safe point before the level crossing, but then proceeded again.) just south of Rogoźno Wielkopolskie railway station on the Poznań–Piła railway. Upon impact, the lorry caught fire and ended up in a ditch. The front two cars of the train involved immediately derailed, in which the train came to a full stop around 50 m (160 ft) south of the crossing. The driver of the lorry died at the scene, with 17 out of the 18 people onboard the train suffering injuries, one of whom was transported to a hospital. Around 200 m (660 ft) of track and overhead wires had to be repaired or replaced, were the line reopened to passenger services on 28 May.
