= Poznań Główny railway station =

Main railway station of Poznań, Poland

Poznań Główny
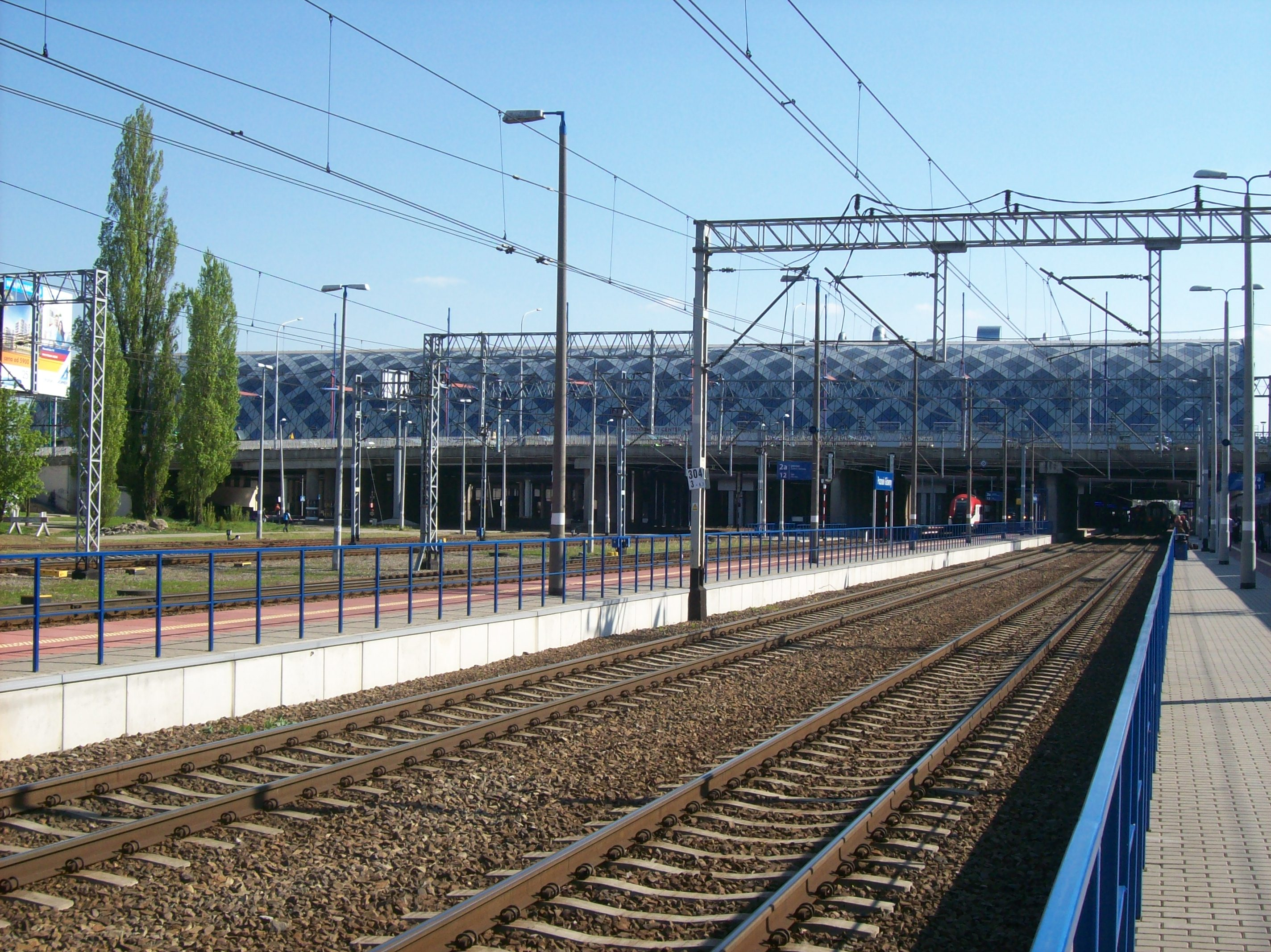
- Poznań Główny railway station

General information
- Location: 1 Dworcowa street, Poznań, Greater Poland Voivodeship; Poland
- Coordinates: 52°24′06″N 16°54′42″E
- Operator: PKP Polskie Linie Kolejowe
- Lines: Warsaw–Kunowice railway; Wrocław–Poznań railway; Kluczbork–Poznań railway; Poznań–Szczecin railway; Poznań–Piła railway
- Platforms: 16
- Connections: Buses: 151, 159, 168, 171, 905; Night buses: 234, 235, 236, 239, 240, 242, 243, 246; Trams: 2, 3, 5, 6, 8, 10, 11, 12, 14, 18

History
- Opened: 10 August 1848; 178 years ago
- Rebuilt: 2011–2012
- Former names: Posen Hauptbahnhof, Poznań

Passengers
- 2019: 22,600,000
Location
- Location within Poland Location within Greater Poland Voivodeship

Poznań Główny lit. 'Poznań Main' is the main railway station of the city of Poznań, Poland's fifth-largest city, and capital of the Greater Poland Voivodeship. The station is located at the junction of the Warsaw–Kunowice railway, Wrocław–Poznań railway, Kluczbork–Poznań railway, Poznań–Szczecin railway and Poznań–Piła railway. Services are operated by PKP Intercity, Polregio and Greater Poland Railways.

In 2023, it served 24.9 million passengers, making it the country's second busiest railway station behind Wrocław Główny.

== History ==
- Ignacy Jan Paderewski arrived at the Summer Station (platform 4b) on December 26, 1918, beginning a visit to Poznan which resulted in the outbreak of the 1918 Greater Poland uprising.
- Along the main road leading from the station to the city centre are a large number of anti-aircraft bunkers from World War II.
- During communist rule an underground hospital was prepared at the station in case of war. It was fully equipped and regularly visited by the secret services.
- Platform 4a was used twice a day by steam trains to Wolsztyn until 2014.
- On 25 November 2006, Ryszard Kapuściński unveiled a plaque in the hall of the station dedicated to Kazimierz Nowak, who travelled 40,000 km (25,000 mi) through Africa on foot and by bicycle.
- Trains are announced by computer, it is so far the only such system operated in Poland, which from 1996 to 2012 was voiced by Paweł Binkowski, a New Theatre actor. Currently, announcements are made using speech synthesis.
- Several acres of land around the railway station were the subject of a dispute between the railway authorities, the city and the authorities of the Greater Polish Voivideship since the 1990s. The railway authorities in Warsaw did not want to give this land to the City of Poznań, despite not using it. After long negotiations, the Integrated Transportation Centre (Pol. "Zintegrowane Centrum Komunikacyjne") is being built on it.

== Modernisations ==
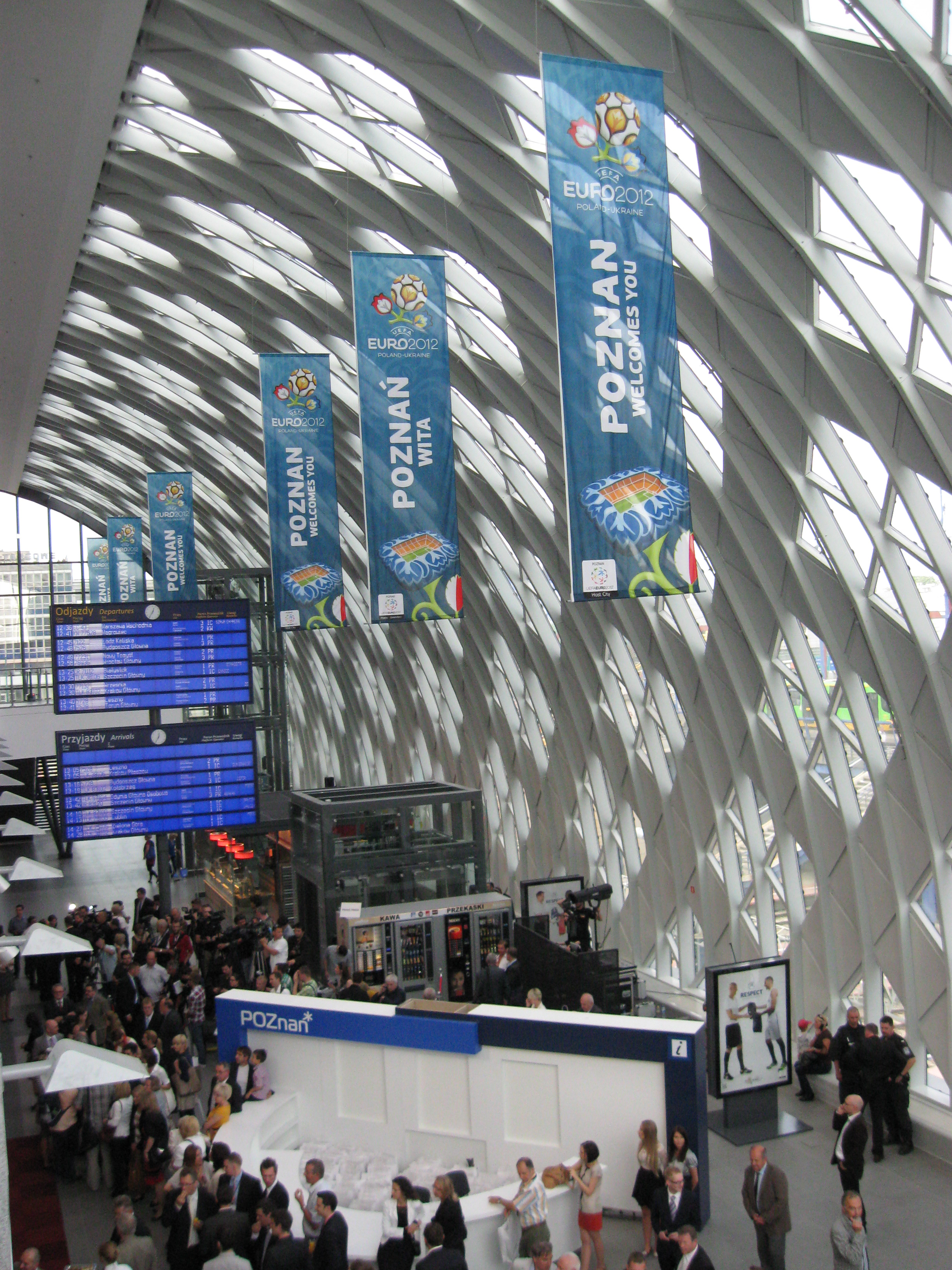
Inside the main hall

Polish State Railways (PKP) began planning modernisations for the station in 2007. In 2009 it began negotiations with seven companies specialising in investments in commercial real estate. A 160 million euro investment agreement was signed with developer Trigranit Development Corporation, paving the way for the construction of an integrated transport centre, which included a rebuilt station, car park, and coach station.

The station and its surrounding area is being completely rebuilt and connected to the bus station and the international congress/convention centre. The entire investment aimed to provide an integrated transport complex for UEFA Euro 2012 in Poznań. Construction of the new station began in the first half of 2011 and the first phase, a fully operational booking hall and waiting area, was opened by Polish president Bronisław Komorowski on 29 May 2012. The old booking hall still exists but is not currently in use for passengers.

An integrated transport hub and shopping centre was opened on 25 October 2013. This features 250 retail units, a coach terminal, cycle lanes and a park and ride facility.

Due to the city's 2010 budget deficit, which resulted from using public funds to build a municipal stadium, the city of Poznań announced that most of the promised investment will be significantly delayed in time, and could remain unfinanced up to 2016. Under a planned third phase, the existing station building would be redeveloped with conference, office and hotel facilities. A study by TTS trade magazine informed in 2014 that the new building was already completed.

== Train services ==
The station is served by the following services:

- EuroCity services (EC) (EC 95 by DB) (EIC by PKP) Berlin – Frankfurt (Oder) – Rzepin – Poznan – Kutno – Warsaw
- EuroCity services (EC) (EC 95 by DB) (IC by PKP) Berlin – Frankfurt (Oder) – Rzepin – Poznan – Bydgoszcz – Gdansk – Gdynia
- EuroNight services (EN) Paris – Strasbourg – Berlin – Frankfurt (Oder) – Poznan – Warsaw – Brest – Minsk – Moscow
- Express Intercity services (EIC) Szczecin — Warsaw
- Intercity services Swinoujscie – Szczecin – Stargard – Krzyz – Poznan – Kutno – Warsaw
- Intercity services Zielona Gora – Zbaszynek – Poznan – Kutno – Warsaw
- Intercity services Wroclaw – Leszno – Poznan – Bydgoszcz – Gdansk – Gdynia
- Intercity services Zielona Gora – Zbaszynek – Poznan – Torun – Olsztyn
- Intercity services Wroclaw – Leszno – Poznan – Torun – Ilawa – Olsztyn – Elk – Bialystok
- Intercity services Bydgoszcz – Poznan – Kutno – Lowicz – Lodz – Krakow
- Intercity services (IC) Swinoujscie – Szczecin – Stargard – Krzyz – Poznan – Leszno – Wroclaw – Opole – Katowice
- Intercity services Kolobrzeg – Pila – Poznan – Wroclaw – Opole – Czestochowa – Krakow – Rzeszow – Zamosc/Przemysl
- Intercity services (IC) Poznań – Ostrów Wielkopolski – Kępno – Lubliniec – Częstochowa – Kraków
- Intercity services Poznan – Ostrow Wielkopolskie – Lubliniec – Katowice
- Intercity services (TLK) Poznań – Ostrów Wielkopolski – Kępno – Lubliniec – Częstochowa – Kraków
- Intercity services (TLK) Warsaw – Świnoujście
- Regional services (R) Poznan – Gniezno – Mogilno – Inowroclaw – Bydgoszcz
- Regional services (R) Poznan – Gniezno – Mogilno – Inowroclaw – Torun
- Regional services (R) Poznan – Sroda Wielkopolska – Jarocin – Ostrow Wielkopolski – Lodz
- Regional services (R) Poznań – Kluczbork
- Regional services (R) Wroclaw – Leszno – Poznan
- Regional services (R) Szczecinek – Piła Główna – Poznań Główny
- Regional services (R) Szczecin – Stargard – Dobiegniew – Krzyz – Wronki – Poznan
- Regional services (KW) Zbaszynek – Zbąszyn – Opalenica – Poznan
- Regional services (KW) Poznan – Gniezno
- Regional services (KW) Poznan – Września – Konin – Kutno
- Regional services (KW) Wolsztyn – Grodzisk Wielkopolski – Poznan
- Regional services (KW) Poznan – Murowana Goślina – Wągrowiec – Golancz
- Regional services (KW) Poznań – Jarocin – Kępno

Preceding station	PKP Intercity	Following station
Zbąszynek towards Berlin Hbf	EuroCity EC 95; EIC	Konin towards Warszawa Wschodnia
Zbąszynek towards Berlin Hbf	EuroCity EC 95; IC	Gniezno towards Gdynia Główna
Krzyż towards Szczecin Główny	EIC	Konin towards Warszawa Wschodnia
Środa Wielkopolska towards Kraków Główny	IC	Terminus
Środa Wielkopolska towards Kraków Główny	TLK	Terminus
Słupca towards Warszawa Wschodnia	TLK	Opalenica towards Świnoujście
Preceding station	Polregio	Following station
Terminus	PR	Poznań Dębiec towards Wrocław Główny
Terminus	PR	Poznań Garbary towards Bydgoszcz Główna
Terminus	PR	Poznań Garbary towards Toruń Główny
Terminus	PR	Poznań Dębina towards Łódź Kaliska
Terminus	PR	Poznań Dębina towards Kluczbork
Poznań Podolany towards Szczecinek	PR	Terminus
Poznań Wola towards Szczecin Główny	PR	Terminus
Preceding station	KW	Following station
Terminus	Poznań - Kutno	Poznań Garbary towards Kutno
Terminus	Poznań - Mogilno	Poznań Garbary towards Mogilno
Terminus	Poznań - Gołańcz	Poznań Garbary towards Gołańcz
Terminus	Poznań - Piła	Poznań Podolany towards Piła Główna
Terminus	Poznań - Krzyż	Poznań Wola towards Krzyż
Terminus	Poznań - Zbąszynek	Poznań Górczyn towards Zbąszynek
Terminus	Poznań - Wolsztyn	Poznań Dębiec towards Wolsztyn
Terminus	Poznań - Rawicz	Poznań Dębiec towards Rawicz
Terminus	Poznań - Milicz	Poznań Dębina towards Milicz
Terminus	Poznań - Odolanów	Poznań Dębina towards Odolanów
Terminus	Poznań - Kępno	Poznań Dębina towards Kępno
Terminus	Poznań - Łódź (Co-operated with Łódzka Kolej Aglomeracyjna)	Poznań Dębina towards Łódź Kaliska
Terminus	Poznań - Kalisz	Poznań Dębina towards Kalisz
Preceding station	Poznań Metropolitan Railway	Following station
Poznań Dębiec towards Kościan	PKM1	Poznań Garbary towards Gniezno
Poznań Górczyn towards Nowy Tomyśl	PKM2	Poznań Garbary towards Września
Poznań Dębiec towards Grodzisk Wielkopolski	PKM3	Poznań Garbary towards Wągrowiec
Poznań Wola towards Wronki	PKM4	Poznań Dębina towards Środa Wielkopolska
Terminus	PKM5	Poznań Podolany towards Rogoźno

Preceding station	PKP Intercity	Following station
Former services
Rzepin towards Paris Est	EuroNight Moscou Express; Suspended 2020	Warszawa Wschodnia towards Moscow Belorussky

== Connections ==
=== Tram ===
Poznań has a large tram network with many services serving the station. All services are operated by MPK Poznań. The tram stops around the station are: Poznań Główny, Most Dworcowy and Dworzec Zachodni. The latter is on the Poznań Fast Tram line.

- 3 (Górczyn – Poznań Główny – Rondo Rataje – Rondo Śródka – Małe Garbary – Armii Poznań – Wilczak – Naramowice)
- 5 (Górczyn – Poznań Główny – City Centre – Os. Lecha – Zegrze – Unii Lubelskiej)
- 6 (Junikowo – Budziszyńska – Stadion miejski – Poznań Główny – Rondo Rataje – Rondo Śródka – Miłostowo)
- 8 (Górczyn – Poznań Główny – Małe Garbary – Rondo Śródka – Miłostowo)
- 10 (Połabska – Armii Poznań – Poznań Główny – Dębiec)
- 11 (Piątkowska – Poznań Główny – Dębiec)
- 12 (Os. Sobieskiego – Poznań Główny – Rondo Rataje – Starołęka)
- 14 (Os. Sobieskiego – Poznań Główny – Górczyn)
- 18 (Ogrody – Rynek Jeżycki – Poznań Główny – Rondo Rataje – Os. Lecha – Franowo)

=== Bus and coach ===
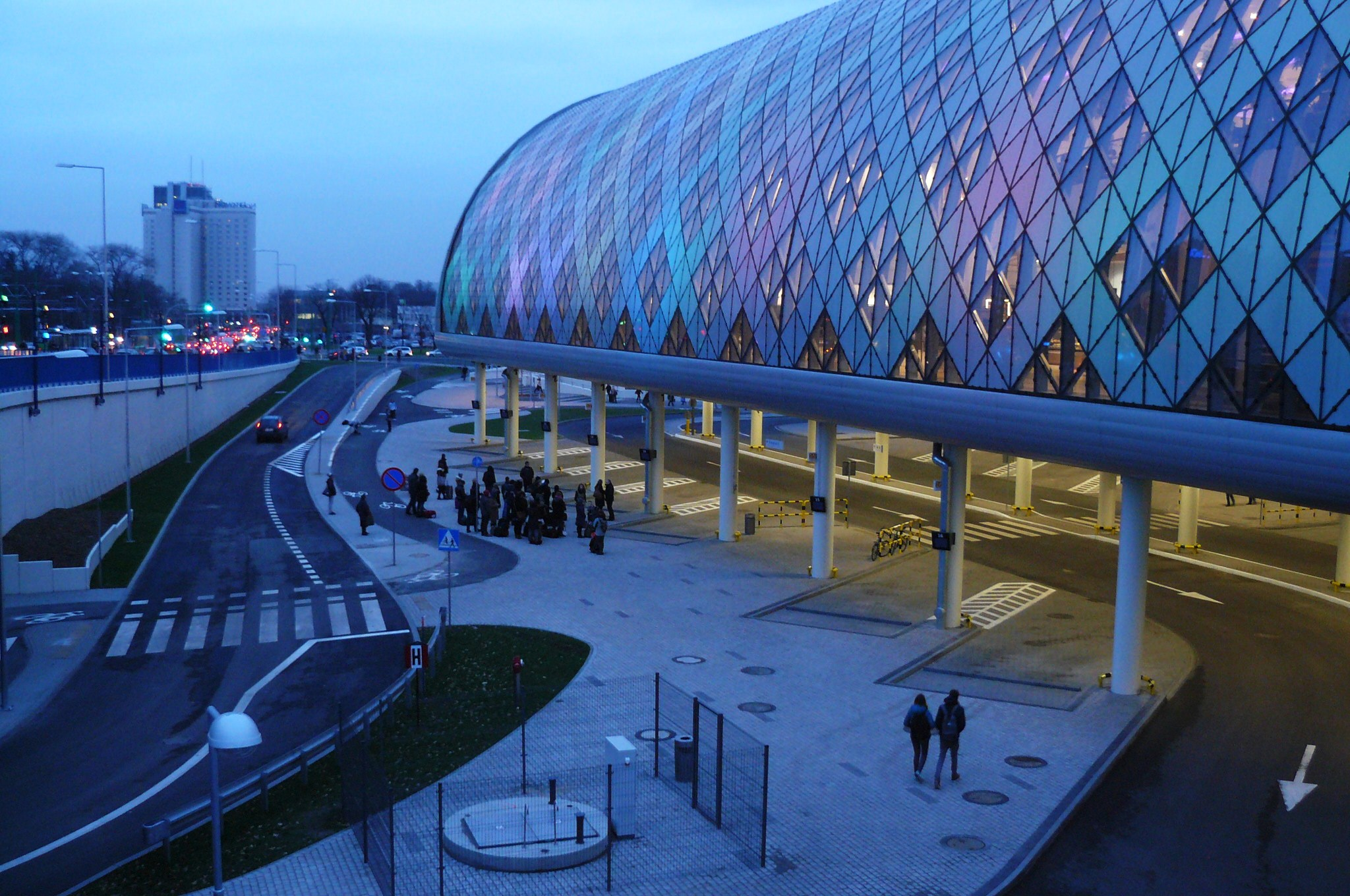
View of the coach station.

- 51 (Poznań Główny – Garbary – Winogrady – Os. Sobieskiego)
- 68 (Poznań Główny – Podolany)
- 71 (Os. Wichrowe Wzgorze – Połabska – Poznań Główny – Os. Debina)
- 905 (Poznań Główny – Piatkowska – Suchy Las – Zlotkowo – Goleczewo – Zielatkowo – Chludowo)
- 59 (Poznań Główny – Poznań Ławica Airport)

Coach services operated by various Polish PKS coach companies, Flixbus and Sindbad among others depart from the coach station.

== See also ==
- Rail transport in Poland
- List of busiest railway stations in Poland
