= Poznań–Piła railway =

Railway line in Poland

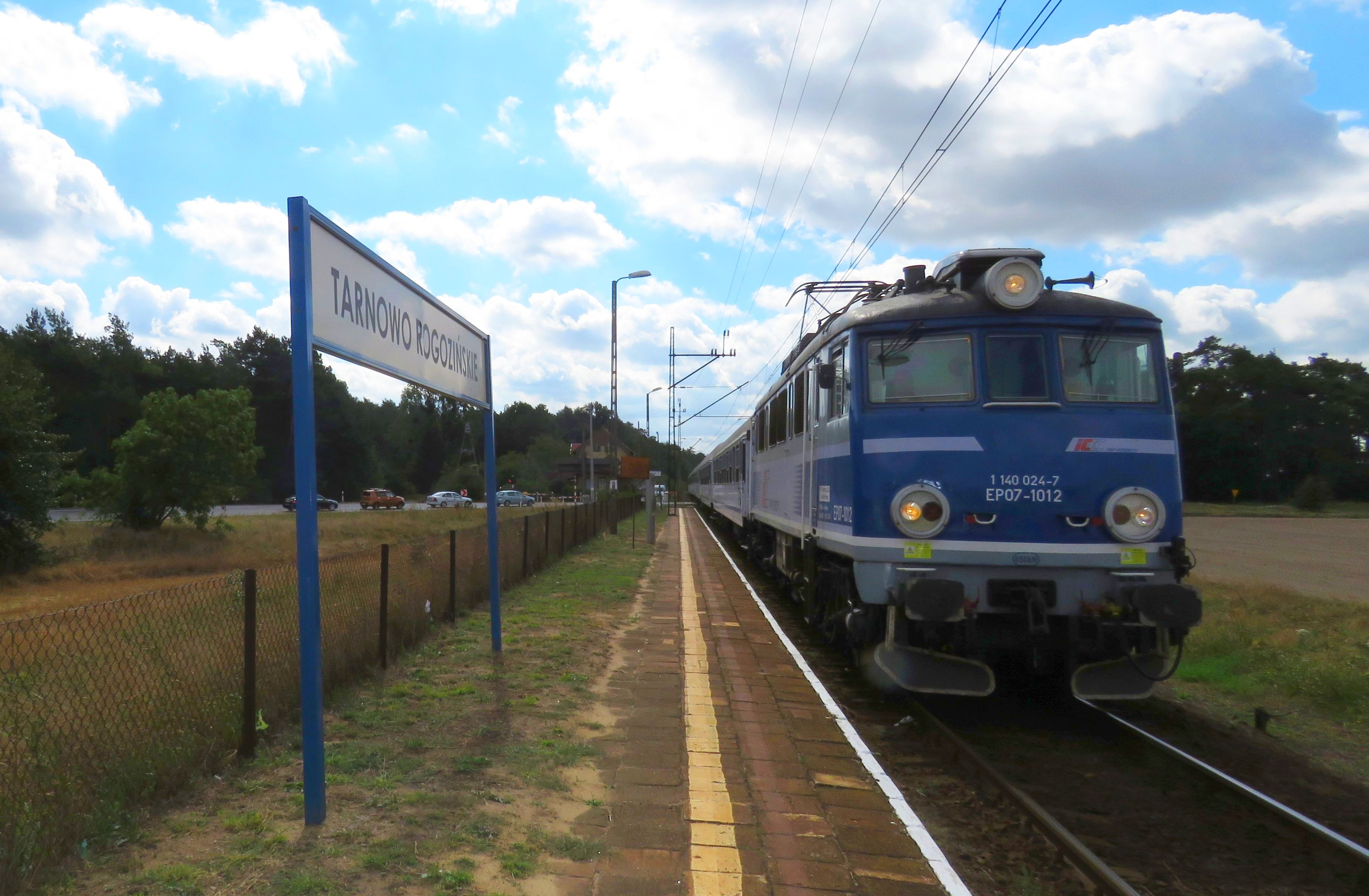
- A PKP Intercity service at Tarnowo Rogozińskie in 2015

Overview
- Status: Operational
- Locale: Poland
- Termini: Poznań Główny; Piła Główna

Service
- Type: Heavy rail
- Route number: 354

History
- Opened: 1879

Technical
- Line length: 92.538 km (57.500 mi)
- Track gauge: 1,435 mm (4 ft 8 1/2 in) standard gauge
- Electrification: 3000 V DC
- Operating speed: 100 km/h (62 mph)

The Poznań–Piła railway is a Polish 92-kilometre long railway line, that connects Poznań with Piła.

== History ==
The line was electrified in 1990. In October 2011, PKP PLK tendered for a feasibility study for the modernisation of the line. A tender for the modernisation was announced in October 2015. This investment is to be organised to be included in the budget of the European Union for the period 2014–2020.

== Route ==
The route is largely single track, with passing places at various stations along the route.

== Usage ==
The line is used by the following service(s):

- Intercity services between Poznań and Piła, continuing to various parts of Poland, including Kołobrzeg, Słupsk, Wrocław, Katowice and Kraków.
- Regional services between Poznań and Piła, with some of these continuing to Kołobrzeg or Koszalin.

== See also ==
- Railway lines of Poland
