= Gniezno railway station =

Railway station in Gniezno, Poland

Gniezno
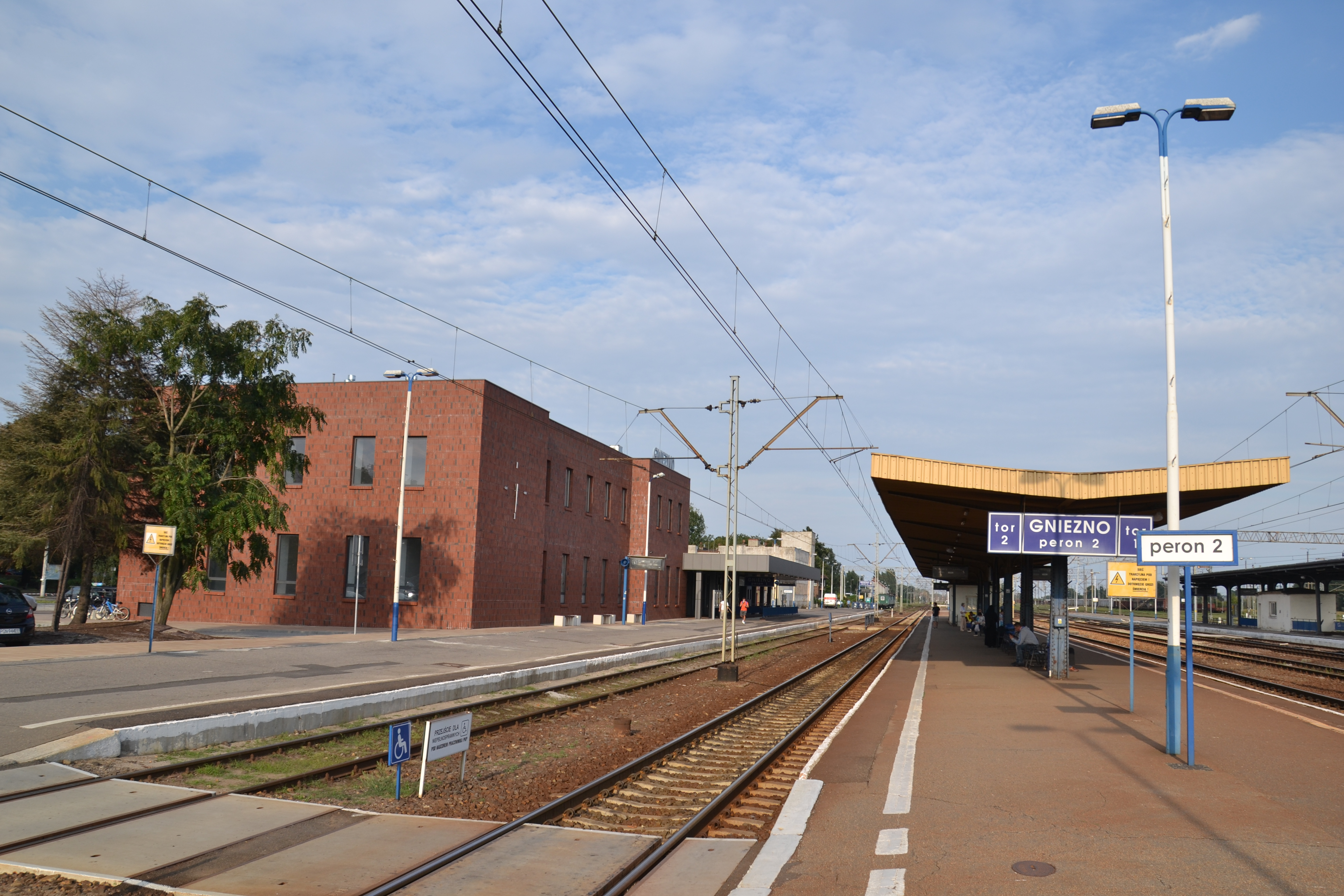
- Gniezno railway station

General information
- Location: Gniezno, Greater Poland Voivodeship; Poland
- Coordinates: 52°31′47″N 17°36′13″E
- System: Railway Station
- Operator: PKP Polskie Linie Kolejowe
- Lines: Poznań–Skandawa railway Oleśnica–Chojnice railway
- Platforms: 5

History
- Opened: 26 May 1872; 154 years ago
- Rebuilt: 2012-2014
Location
- Location within Poland

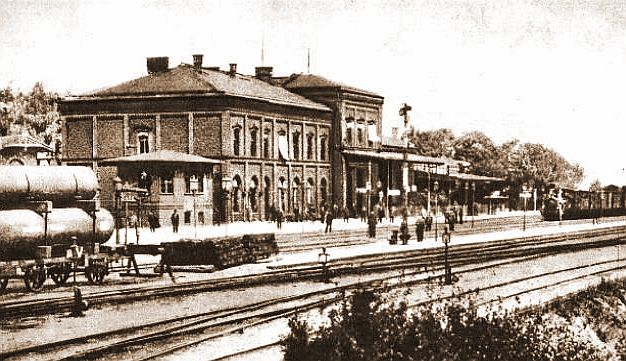
The station in 1896.

Gniezno railway station is a railway station serving the city of Gniezno, in the Greater Poland Voivodeship, Poland. The station is located on the Poznań–Skandawa railway and Oleśnica–Chojnice railway. The train services are operated by PKP, Polregio and Greater Poland Railways.

== History ==
The history of the railway station in Gniezno started on 30 November 1867 when, as a result of intense negotiations, a contract to build a railway from Poznan by Gniezno and Inowrocław to Torun and Bydgoszcz was signed. The railway station in Gniezno was one of the most important on the route to Bydgoszcz and Torun. Once the decision had been made and the optimal route had been studied, the first excavations were recorded in September 1868, at the area of the current railway station in Trzemeszno.

After four years of construction of the line, the grand opening of the station took place on 26 May 1872, when the first train ran on the new line. The first passenger service was inaugurated on 1 July 1873. The construction of a second railway line connecting Gniezno with Oleśnica was approved on 17 June 1872 with the official opening on 30 June 1875.

Gniezno railway station is located at the 50th kilometer mark on the line from Poznan to Torun, on the south side of the city of Gniezno. The most important building opposite the station has become a powerful addition to the expansion of the railway station, a depot. The locomotive depot has been rebuilt several times and it has now become a roundhouse, one of Europe's largest with 24 roads coming from it. Nowadays it is open for tourists.

In the years 1908 to 1911, as a result of numerous transformations both in the late nineteenth and early twentieth century, the technical and operational activity at the station expanded.

With the outbreak of World War II, the city of Gniezno was engaged in the raids. In September 1939 the railway lines were damaged or destroyed. On 6 September, as a result of the bombing, the roundhouse and several steam locomotives were destroyed. In 1940, as a result of the meeting of the Special Committee approved the plan "Otto", which aimed at the restoration and reconstruction of railways, modernization and expansion of railway stations and in the case of Gniezno modernization and expansion of the roundhouse. Thanks to the program, "Otto" in addition to the expansion and modernisation of railway lines and the construction of footbridges and roundhouse roads, telecommunication installations, reconstruction and electrification of railway sidings and the depot.

But the same program "Otto" did not finish there as the freight yard at Gniezo was expanded to relieve Poznan. The history of the railway station and roundhouse was written in 2010 in the book Miron Urbaniak Fri. "The historic railway station Gniezno" and the book of Thomas Tomkowiak Fri. "Secrets of Gniezno".

== Modernisation ==
In 1967-1968 the station was modernised with new platforms. Between 2012 and 2014, the station had a complete modernisation and reconstruction of the current station building and surrounding areas.

== Train services ==
The station is served by the following service(s):

- EuroCity services (EC) (EC 95 by DB) (IC by PKP) Berlin - Frankfurt (Oder) - Rzepin - Poznan - Bydgoszcz - Gdansk - Gdynia
- Intercity services Wroclaw - Leszno - Poznan - Inowroclaw - Bydgoszcz - Gdansk - Gdynia
- Intercity services Krakow - Lodz - Kutno - Konin - Poznan - Inowroclaw - Bydgoszcz
- Intercity services Wroclaw - Leszno - Poznan - Inowroclaw - Bydgoszcz - Gdansk - Gdynia
- Intercity services Wroclaw - Leszno - Poznan - Inowroclaw - Torun - Olsztyn - Bialystok
- Intercity services Zielona Góra - Zbąszynek - Poznan - Inowroclaw - Bydgoszcz - Gdansk - Gdynia
- Intercity services Zielona Góra - Zbąszynek - Poznan - Inowroclaw - Torun - Olsztyn
- Intercity services Jelenia Gora - Wroclaw - Jarocin - Poznan - Inowroclaw - Bydgoszcz - Gdansk - Gdynia
- Regional services (R) Poznan - Gniezno - Mogilno - Inowroclaw - Bydgoszcz
- Regional services (R) Poznan - Gniezno - Mogilno - Inowroclaw - Torun
- Regional services (KW) Poznan - Gniezno
- Regional services (KW) Gniezno - Krotoszyn

Preceding station	PKP Intercity	Following station
Poznań Główny towards Berlin Hbf	EuroCity EC 95; IC	Inowrocław towards Gdynia Główna
Preceding station	Polregio	Following station
Pierzyska towards Poznań Główny	PR	Jankowo Dolne towards Bydgoszcz Główna
Pierzyska towards Poznań Główny	PR	Jankowo Dolne towards Toruń Główny
Preceding station	KW	Following station
Pierzyska towards Poznań Główny	Poznań - Mogilno	Jankowo Dolne towards Mogilno
Terminus	Gniezno - Krotoszyn	Gębarzewo towards Krotoszyn
Preceding station	Poznań Metropolitan Railway	Following station
Pierzyska towards Kościan	PKM1	Terminus
