= Lasocice, Greater Poland Voivodeship =

Lasocice
- Village
- Location within Poland
- Coordinates: 51°49′28″N 16°29′8″E
- Country: Poland
- Voivodeship: Greater Poland
- County: Leszno
- Gmina: Święciechowa
- Population: 735

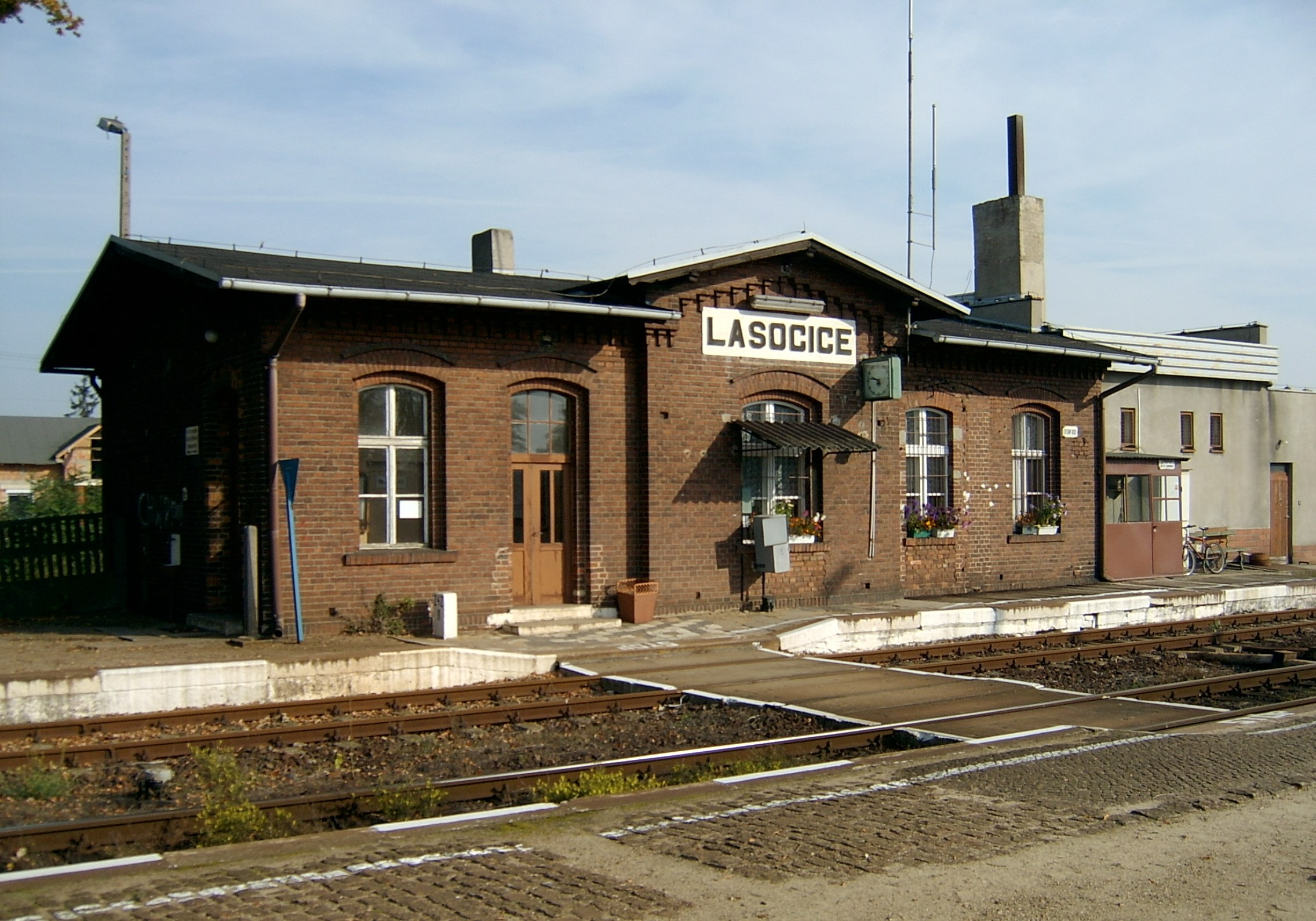
Lasocice, Greater Poland Voivodeship

Lasocice [lasɔˈt͡ɕit͡sɛ] is a village in the administrative district of Gmina Święciechowa, within Leszno County, Greater Poland Voivodeship, in west-central Poland.
