= Wolsztyn railway station =

Railway station in Wolsztyn, Poland

Wolsztyn
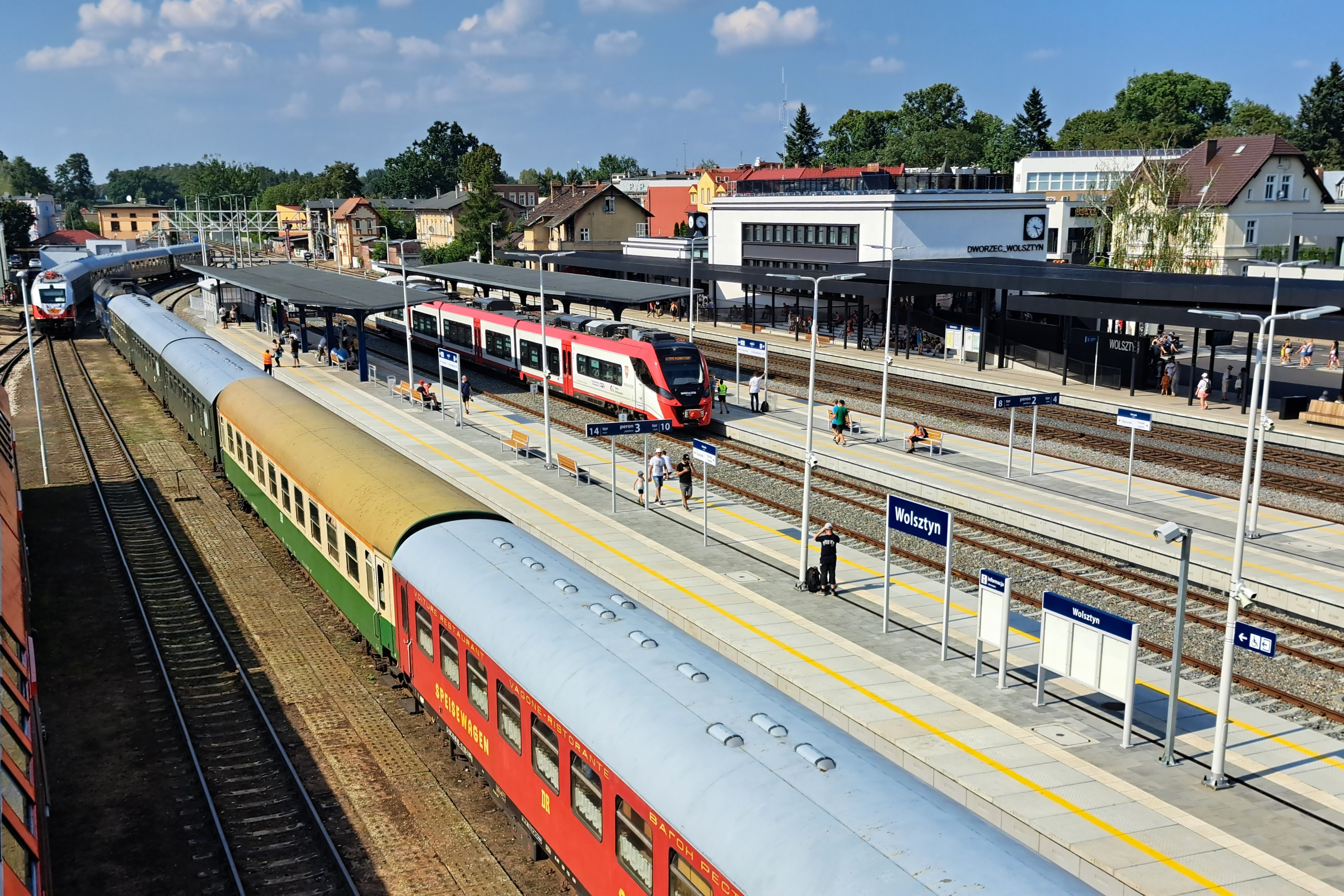
- Wolsztyn railway station

General information
- Location: Wolsztyn, Greater Poland Voivodeship; Poland
- Coordinates: 52°06′41″N 16°06′33″E
- System: Railway Station
- Operator: Greater Poland Railways
- Lines: Sulechów–Luboń koło Poznania railway Leszno–Zbąszyń railway Wolsztyn–Zagan railway (closed)
- Platforms: 5

History
- Opened: 1 June 1886; 140 years ago

Services
Preceding station	KW	Following station
Terminus	KW	Adamowo towards Poznań Główny
Tuchorza towards Zbąszynek	KW	Nowy Widzim towards Leszno
Location
- Location within Poland

Wolsztyn railway station is a railway station serving the town of Wolsztyn, in the Greater Poland Voivodeship, Poland. The station opened on 1 June 1886 and is located on the Sulechów–Luboń koło Poznania railway, Leszno–Zbąszyń railway and the closed Wolsztyn–Zagan railway. The train services are operated by Greater Poland Railways.

== History ==
The first building was built in 1886. It was completely destroyed on 1 September 1939, and was only fit for demolition. A newer station was built and opened in 1961.

== Train services ==
The station is served by the following services:

- Regional services (KW) Wolsztyn - Grodzisk Wielkopolski - Poznań- Wągrowiec - Gołańcz
- Regional services (KW) Zbąszynek - Zbąszyń - Wolsztyn - Boszkowo - Leszno

== Wolsztyn Roundhouse ==
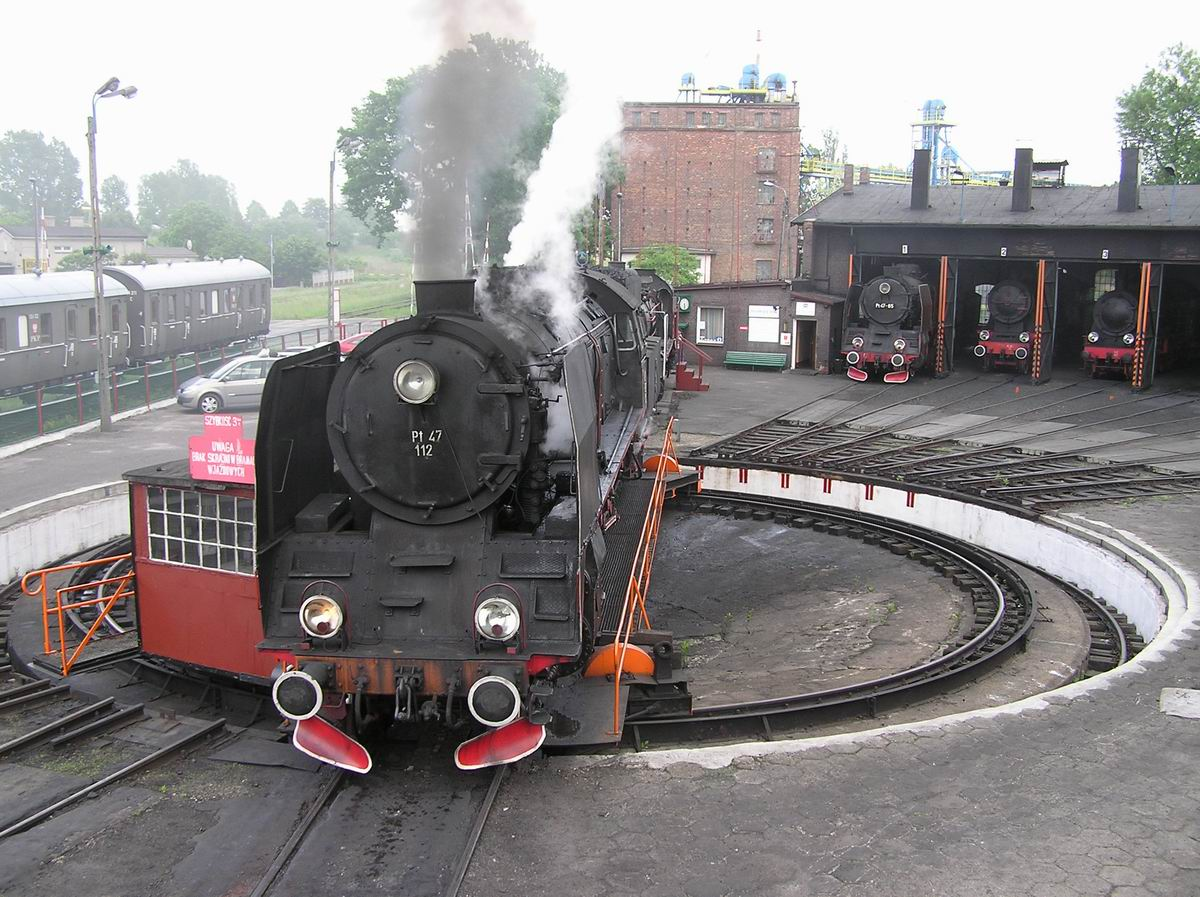
A steam engine on the turntable at the roundhouse

Near the railway station is Wolsztyn Roundhouse, built in 1907 and was enlarged in 1909, it has 4 positions for steam locomotives. An interesting element of the station is the water tower to 1907.

There is a steam festival every year at the end of April or start of May.
