= Kępno railway station =

Railway station in Kępno, Poland

Kępno

General information
- Location: Kępno; Greater Poland Voivodeship; Poland
- Owner: Polskie Koleje Państwowe S.A.

Construction
- Structure type: Tower station
Location

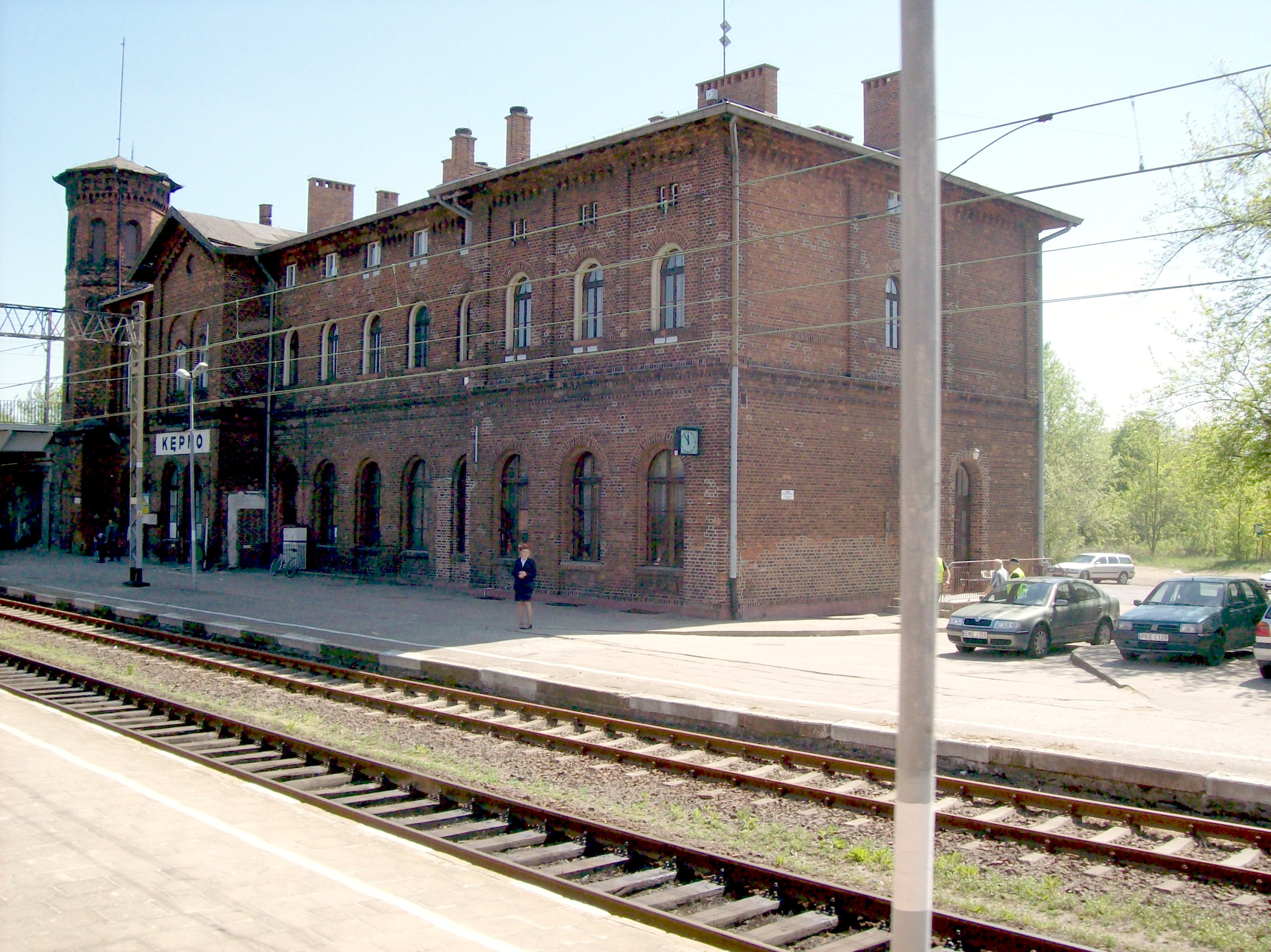
Station exterior

Kępno is a railway station in Kępno (Greater Poland Voivodeship), Poland run by PKP, the Polish State Railways.

== Train services ==
The station is served by the following services:

- Intercity services (IC) Poznań - Ostrów Wielkopolski - Kępno - Lubliniec - Częstochowa - Kraków
- Intercity services (TLK) Poznań - Ostrów Wielkopolski - Kępno - Lubliniec - Częstochowa - Kraków
- Regional services (R) Poznań - Kluczbork
- Regional services (KW) Poznań – Jarocin – Kępno
