= Zbąszynek railway station =

Railway station in Zbąszynek, Poland

Coordinates: 52.2422°N 15.8169°E

Zbąszynek
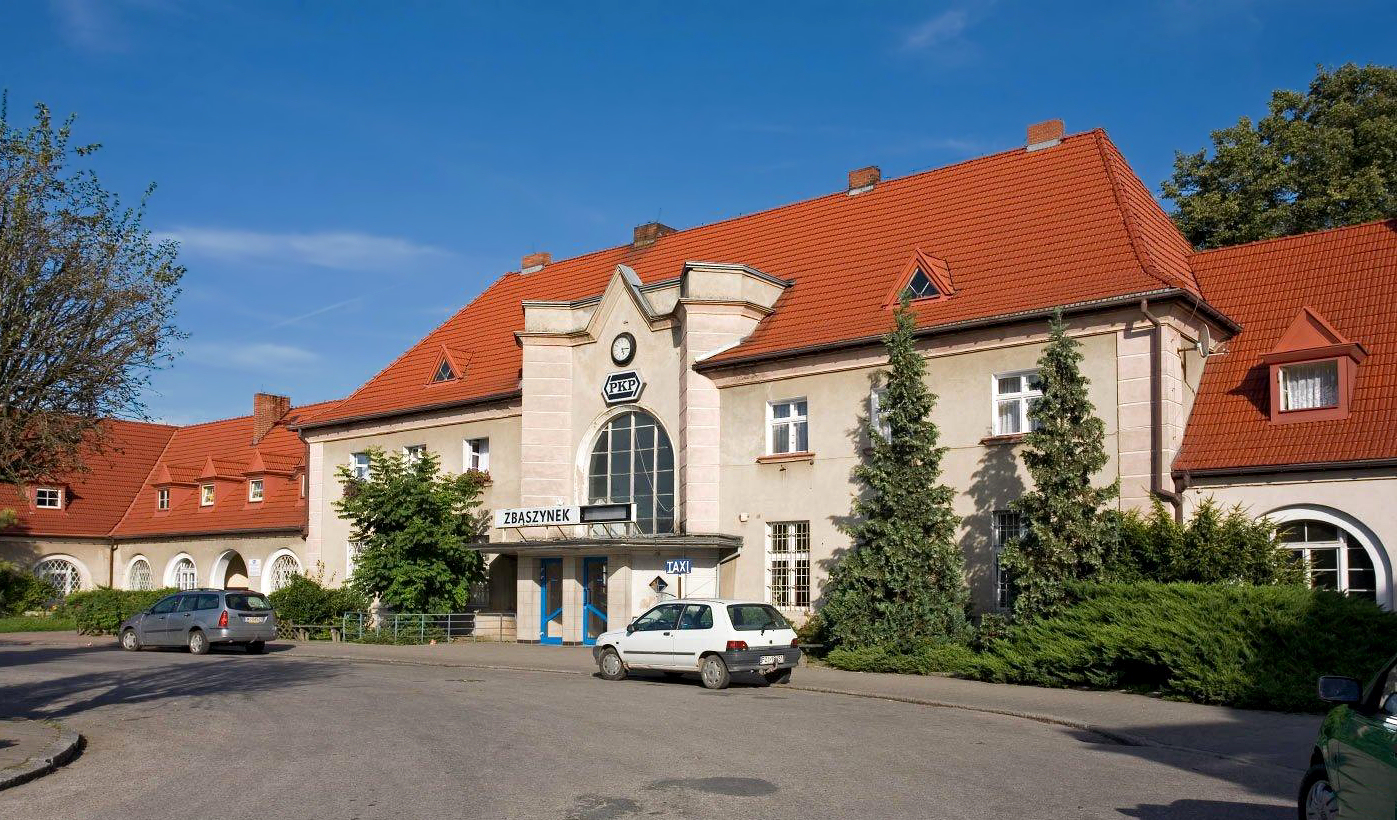
- Zbąszynek railway station

General information
- Location: Zbąszynek, Lubusz Voivodeship; Poland
- System: Railway Station
- Operator: PKP Polskie Linie Kolejowe
- Lines: Warsaw–Kunowice railway Zbąszynek–Guben railway Zbąszynek-Gorzów Wielkopolski railway
- Platforms: 5

History
- Opened: 1925; 101 years ago
- Former names: Neubentschen (1922-1930); Neu Bentschen (1931-1945); Nowy Zbąszyń (1945)

Services
| Preceding station | PKP Intercity | Following station |
|---|---|---|
| Świebodzin towards Berlin Hbf | EuroCity EC 95; EIC | Poznań Główny towards Warszawa Wschodnia |
| Świebodzin towards Berlin Hbf | EuroCity EC 95; IC | Poznań Główny towards Gdynia Główna |
| Świebodzin towards Köln Hbf | EuroNight | Poznań Główny towards Warszawa Wschodnia |
| Preceding station | Polregio | Following station |
| Szczaniec towards Rzepin | PR | Terminus |
| Babimost towards Zielona Góra | PR | Dąbrówka Wielkopolska towards Gorzów Wielkopolski |
| Preceding station | KW | Following station |
| Zbąszyń towards Poznań Główny | Poznań - Zbąszynek | Terminus |
| Zbąszyń towards Leszno | Leszno - Zbąszynek | Terminus |
Location
- Location within Poland

Zbąszynek railway station is a railway station serving the town of Zbąszynek, in the Lubusz Voivodeship, Poland. The station opened in 1925 and is located on the Warsaw–Kunowice railway, Zbąszynek–Guben railway and Zbąszynek-Gorzów Wielkopolski railway. The train services are operated by PKP, Polregio and Greater Poland Railways.

The station was opened as a border station between Germany and Poland, with Zbąszyń railway station becoming the Polish border station. Between 1922 and 1930 the station was known as Neubentschen and from 1931 until 1945 the station was known as Neu Bentschen.

== Train services ==
The station is served by the following service(s):

- EuroCity services (EC) (EC 95 by DB) (EIC by PKP) Berlin - Frankfurt (Oder) - Rzepin - Poznan - Kutno - Warsaw
- EuroCity services (EC) (EC 95 by DB) (IC by PKP) Berlin - Frankfurt (Oder) - Rzepin - Poznan - Bydgoszcz - Gdansk - Gdynia
- EuroNight services (EN) Cologne - Duisburg - Dortmund - Berlin - Frankfurt (Oder) - Poznan - Kutno - Warsaw
- Intercity services Zielona Gora - Zbaszynek - Poznan - Kutno - Warsaw
- Intercity services Zielona Góra - Zbąszynek - Poznan - Inowroclaw - Bydgoszcz - Gdansk - Gdynia
- Intercity services Zielona Góra - Zbąszynek - Poznan - Inowroclaw - Torun - Olsztyn
- Regional services (R) Rzepin - Swiebodzin - Zbasynek
- Regional services (R) (Nowa Sol -) Zielona Gora - Zbaszynek - Zbąszyn - Opalenica - Poznan
- Regional services (R) Zielona Gora - Zbaszynek - Miedzyrzecz - Gorzow Wielkopolskie
- Regional services (KW) Zbaszynek - Zbąszyn - Opalenica - Poznan
- Regional services (KW) Zbaszynek - Zbaszyn - Wolsztyn - Boszkowo - Leszno
