= Wrocław–Poznań railway =

Railway line in Poland

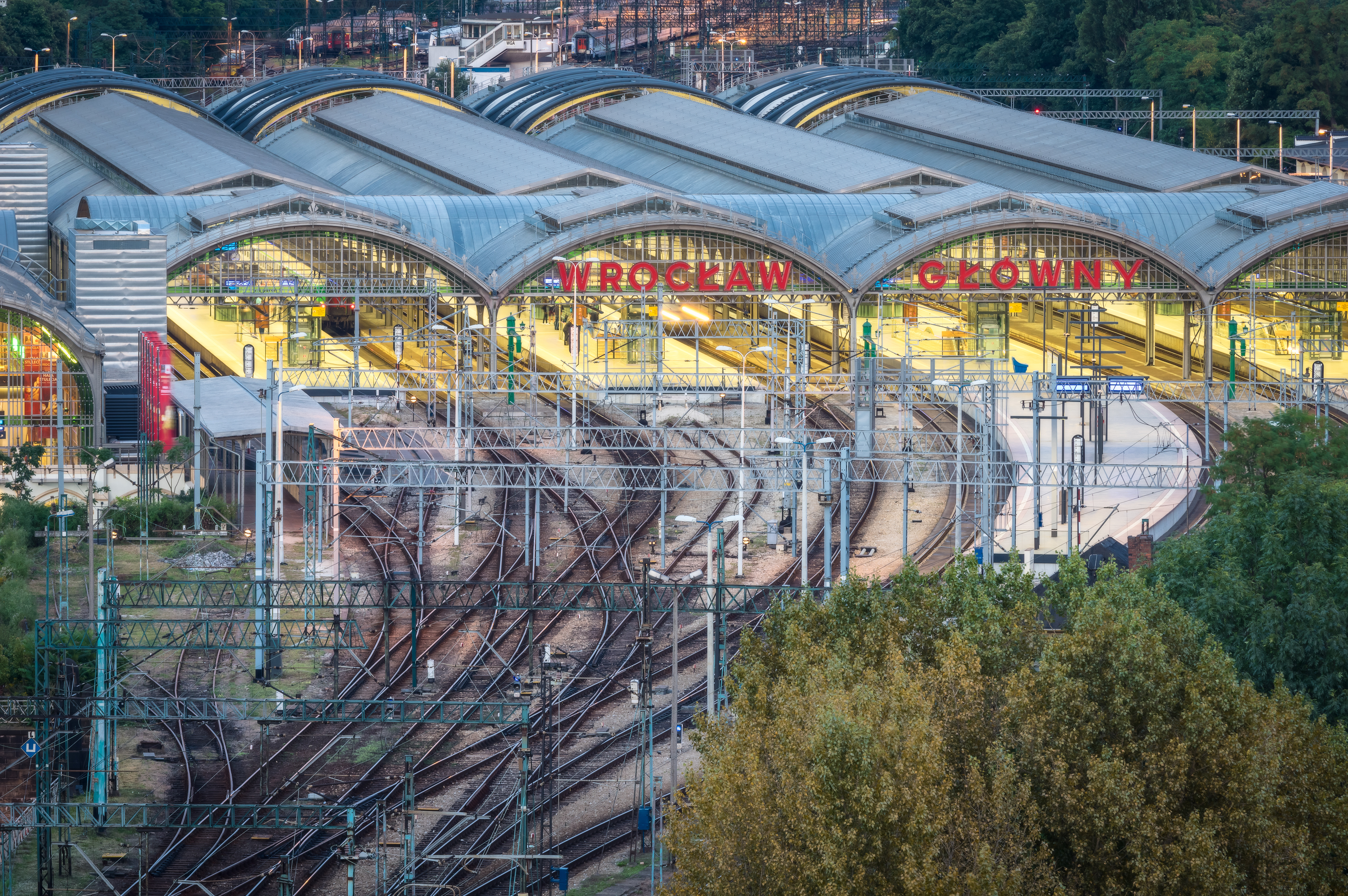
- Wrocław Główny

Overview
- Status: in use
- Locale: Poland
- Termini: Wrocław; Poznań

Service
- Type: Heavy rail
- Route number: 271

History
- Opened: 1856

Technical
- Line length: 164 km (102 mi)
- Track gauge: 1,435 mm (4 ft 8 1/2 in) standard gauge
- Electrification: 3000 V DC
- Operating speed: 160 km/h (99 mph)

The Wrocław–Poznań railway is a 213-kilometre-long (132 mi) Polish railway line, that connects southern Poland and Wrocław with Leszno, Poznań and further to Szczecin. The railway is part of European TEN-T route E59 from Scandinavia to Vienna, Budapest and Prague.

== Opening ==
In 1853, a decision was made to build a railway line connecting Wrocław with Poznań. The Upper Silesian Railway (Oberschlesische Eisenbahn Gesellschaft) obtained a concession for the construction of the railway, with construction starting in Leszno, in three directions: to Wrocław, Poznań and Głogów. A prototype steam locomotive entered Leszno station from Rawicz on 27 September 1856, and the first regular train service started on 27 October 1856. The ceremonial opening of the line, involving city authorities and residents, took place 29 October 1856.

== History ==
In the interwar period, Leszno station served as a border control station. On the railway, the train service was limited to 2 passenger trains and the 801/802 express train between Wroclaw and Gdańsk. From Poznan, two passenger trains reached Rawicz. Between Leszno and Wrocław there were 2 pairs of international passenger trains (without stopping in Lasocice, border control station in Leszno), and 3 pairs of trains to the border at Lasocice from Leszno. Here the border was on the line of today's border of Greater Poland Voivodeship and Lower Silesian Voivodeship.

== Electrification ==
Electrification of the lines around Leszno took place in three stages:

- 31 May 1969: - Poznań - Puszczykowko
- 20 December 1969: Puszczykowko - Leszno
- 22 April 1970: Leszno - Wrocław

== Modernisation ==
Since 2010, PKP Polish Railway Lines has led the modernisation of railway line E59 between Wrocław and Poznań. The project is co-financed by the European Union. As a result of the works, the line speed was increased up to 160 km/h and travel time on the section between Wrocław and Poznań decreased to 75 minutes on the fastest trains. In addition, the Leszno and Poznań stations were equipped with two local traffic control centres. Completion of the work was planned for 2014, but the railway was only finished in 2023. Along with the modernisation of the tracks, stations were improved, and sound barriers and underpasses were built to reduce collisions and noise.

== See also ==
- Railway lines of Poland
