= Railway lines of Poland =

Contents
1 List (1.1 000s · 1.2 100s · 1.3 200s · 1.4 300s · 1.5 400s · 1.6 500s · 1.7 600s · 1.8 700s · 1.9 800s · 1.10 900s) · 2 References · 3 See also

Every railway line in Poland has its own number, with the lowest numbers attached to the most important and most strategic routes.

Line number 1 links Warsaw Centralna with Katowice Central Station, while line number 999, the last one on the list, is a branch line connecting Piła Main with the secondary-importance station Piła North (Pila Północ).

A very detailed MAP OF RAILWAY LINES OF POLAND may be downloaded from the website 'Polskie Linie Kolejowe - Mapy. Six different maps are available, each of which can be downloaded by clicking on 'POBIERZ.' The first map is the most detailed, showing all railway stations in Poland, with each line labelled by its line number.

== List ==
No.	Line Name
1	Warszawa Centralna – Katowice; Warsaw–Vienna Railway (Polish: Kolej Warszawsko-Wiedeńska) * Warsaw to Dąbrowa Górnicza Ząbkowice (1847) * Dąbrowa Górnicza Ząbkowice - Katowice (1859)
2	Warszawa Centralna – Terespol; Warsaw–Terespol Railway (Polish: Kolej Warszawsko-Terespolskiej) * Warsaw (Praga) to Siedlce (1866) * Siedlce to Terespol (1867); Warsaw Cross-City Line (Polish: Kolej średnicowa) * Warsaw Center to Praga (1933)
3	Warszawa Zachodnia – Kunowice; Warsaw - Kalisz Railway (Polish: Kolej Warszawsko-Kaliska) * Warsaw to Łowicz (1902) * Łowicz - Kunowice (?)
4	Grodzisk Mazowiecki – Zawiercie; Central Rail Line (Polish: Centralna Magistrala Kolejowa, CMK) (1977)
5	Korytów – Gdańsk Port Północny; Central Rail Line (line planned, not constructed)
6	Zielonka – Kuźnica Białostocka; Warsaw – Saint Petersburg Railway (Polish: Kolej Warszawsko-Petersburska) (1862)
7	Warszawa Wschodnia railway station – Dorohusk; Vistula River Railroad (Polish: Kolej Nadwiślańska) (1877)
8	Warszawa Zachodnia – Kraków Główny railway station
9	Warszawa Wschodnia railway station – Gdańsk Główny railway station Vistula River Railroad (Polish: Kolej Nadwiślańska) (1877)
10	Legionowo – Tłuszcz
11	Skierniewice – Łowicz Główny railway station Warsaw–Vienna railway (Polish: Kolej Warszawsko-Wiedeńska) (1862)
12	Skierniewice – Łuków
13	Krusze – Pilawa
14	Łódź Kaliska – Tuplice; Warsaw - Kalisz Railway (Polish: Kolej Warszawsko-Kaliska) (1902)
15	Bednary – Łódź Kaliska; Warsaw - Kalisz Railway (Polish: Kolej Warszawsko-Kaliska) (1902)
16	Łódź Widzew railway station – Kutno
17	Łódź Fabryczna railway station – Koluszki; Warsaw–Vienna railway (Polish: Kolej Warszawsko-Wiedeńska) (1866)
18	Kutno – Piła Główna railway station
19	Warszawa Główna railway station – Józefinów
20	Warszawa Główna railway station – Warszawa Praga
21	Warszawa Wileńska – Zielonka; Warsaw – Saint Petersburg Railway (Polish: Kolej Warszawsko-Petersburska) (1862)
22	Tomaszów Mazowiecki – Radom
23	Warszawa Główna railway station – Warszawa Zachodnia railway station T2/1G,12/2G
24	Piotrków Trybunalski – Zarzecze – Biały Ług
25	Łódź Kaliska – Dębica
26	Łuków – Radom
27	Nasielsk – Toruń Wschodni railway station
28	Wieliszew – Zegrze
29	Tłuszcz – Ostrołęka
30	Łuków – Lublin Północ railway station
31	Siedlce – Siemianówka
32	Czeremcha – Białystok
33	Kutno – Brodnica
34	Ostrołęka – Małkinia – Siedlce
35	Ostrołęka – Szczytno
36	Ostrołęka – Łapy
37	Białystok – Zubki Białostockie railway station
38	Białystok – Bartoszyce – Głomno
39	Olecko – Suwałki
40	Sokółka – Suwałki
41	Ełk – Gołdap
42	Warszawa Główna railway station – Warszawa Szczęśliwice railway station T610/202/3,2/6
43	Czeremcha – Brześć
44	Mikołajów – Regny
45	Warszawa Wschodnia railway station – Warszawa Grochów railway station T1G,2G
46	Warszawa Zachodnia railway station – Warszawa Czyste railway station T201,2S
47	Warszawa Śródmieście WKD – Grodzisk Mazowiecki Radońska – Grodzisk Mazowiecki EKD; Electric Commuter Railway (Polish: Elektrycza Kolej Dojazdowa) (1927)
48	Podkowa Leśna Główna – Milanówek Grudów; Electric Commuter Railway (Polish: Elektrycza Kolej Dojazdowa) (1934)
49	Śniadowo – Łomża
50	Zambrów – Czerwony Bór
51	Suwałki – Trakiszki
52	Lewki – Nieznany Bór railway station – Białowieża Towarowa railway station
53	Tomaszów Mazowiecki – Spała
54	Giżycko – Kruklanki
55	Sokołów Podlaski – Siedlce
56	Płock Radziwie railway station – Płock Radziwie Port railway station
57	Kuźnica Białostocka – Gieniusze - Machnacz (sz)
58	Granica Państwa (Zubki Białostockie) – Waliły Las railway station (sz)
59	Granica Państwa (Svislac) – Chryzanów railway station (sz)
60	Kobylany – Terespol (sz)
61	Kielce – Fosowskie
62	Tunel – Sosnowiec Główny railway station
63	Dorohusk – Zawadówka Naftobaza railway station (sz)
64	Kozłów – Koniecpol
65	Hrubieszów-Włodzimierz Wołyński border crossing – Sławków Południowy; Broad Gauge Metallurgy Line (Polish: Linia Hutnicza Szerokotorowa, LHS)
66	Zwierzyniec Towarowy – Stalowa Wola Południe
67	Lublin – Świdnik
68	Lublin – Przeworsk
69	Rejowiec – Hrebenne
70	Włoszczowice – Chmielów
71	Ocice – Rzeszów Główny railway station
72	Zawada – Hrubieszów Miasto railway station
73	Sitkówka Nowiny railway station – Busko Zdrój
74	Sobów – Stalowa Wola-Rozwadów railway station
75	Rytwiany – Połaniec
76	Bąkowiec – Kozienice
77	Janików – Świerże Górne
78	Sandomierz – Grębów
79	Padew – Wola Baranowska LHS
80	Furmany – Olendry
81	Chełm Osobowa – Włodawa
82	Bąkowiec – Puławy Azoty
83	Zawada – Zamość Bortatycze – Jarosławiec
84	Grębów – Olendry
90	Zebrzydowice – Cieszyn
91	Kraków Główny Osobowy – Medyka; Galician Railway of Archduke Charles Louis (Polish: Kolej galicyjska im. Karola Ludwika); Kraków to Przemyśl (1860); Przemyśl to Lwów (1861)
92	Przemyśl – Medyka (sz); Galician Railway of Archduke Charles Louis (Polish: Kolej galicyjska im. Karola Ludwika) broad gauge line from Przemyśl to Polish-Ukrainian border
93	Trzebinia – Zebrzydowice
94	Kraków Płaszów – Oświęcim; Galician Transversal Railway (Polish: Galicyjska Kolej Transwersalna) 1884
95	Kraków Mydlniki – Podłęże
96	Tarnów – Leluchów
97	Skawina – Żywiec; Galician Transversal Railway (Polish: Galicyjska Kolej Transwersalna) 1884
98	Sucha Beskidzka – Chabówka; Galician Transversal Railway (Polish: Galicyjska Kolej Transwersalna) 1884
99	Chabówka – Zakopane
100	Kraków Mydlniki – Gaj
101	Munina – Hrebenne
102	Przemyśl Główny – Malhowice; First Hungarian-Galician Railway (Polish: Pierwsza Węgiersko-Galicyjska Droga Żelazna) (1872)
103	Trzebinia – Wadowice – Skawce
104	Chabówka – Nowy Sącz; Galician Transversal Railway (Polish: Galicyjska Kolej Transwersalna) 1884
105	Muszyna – Krynica; Galician Transversal Railway (Polish: Galicyjska Kolej Transwersalna) 1884
106	Rzeszów Główny – Jasło
107	Nowy Zagórz – Łupków
108	Stróże – Krościenko
109	Kraków Bieżanów – Wieliczka Rynek-Kopalnia
110	Gorlice Zagórzany – Gorlice
112	Kraków Płaszów – Kraków Wisła
113	Podłęże – Niepołomice
114	Trzebinia – Trzebinia Siersza
115	Tarnów – Szczucin
116	Granica Państwa (Werchrata) – Kaplisze (sz)
117	Kalwaria Zebrzydowska Lanckorona – Bielsko-Biała Główna
118	Kraków Mydlniki – Kraków Balice (Międzynarodowy Port Lotniczy)
119	Żurawica – Małkowice
120	Hurko – Krówniki
121	Medyka – Chałupki Medyckie
123	Hurko – Krówniki (sz)
124	Medyka – Chałupki Medyckie (sz)
125	Żurawica – Małkowice (sz)
126	Jaworzno Szczakowa – Chrzanów – Płaza – Bolęcin
127	Radzionków – Tarnowskie Góry TGB T3
128	Radzionków – Nakło Śląskie T4
129	Tarnowskie Góry TGB – Kalety T3
130	Tarnowskie Góry TGD – Kalety T4
131	Chorzów Batory – Tczew; Coal Trunk-Line (Polish: Magistrala Węglowa)
132	Bytom – Wrocław Główny
133	Dąbrowa Górnicza Ząbkowice – Kraków Główny Osobowy
134	Jaworzno Szczakowa – Mysłowice
135	Gliwice Łabędy – Pyskowice
136	Kędzierzyn Koźle – Opole Groszowice
137	Katowice – Legnica
138	Oświęcim – Katowice
139	Katowice – Zwardoń
140	Katowice Ligota – Nędza
141	Katowice Ligota – Gliwice
142	Katowice Ligota – Tychy
143	Kalety – Wrocław Mikołajów WP2
144	Tarnowskie Góry – Opole Główne
145	Chorzów Stary – Radzionków
146	Wyczerpy– Chorzew Siemkowice
147	Zabrze Biskupice – Gliwice
148	Pszczyna – Rybnik
149	Zabrze Makoszowy – Leszczyny
150	Most Wisła – Chybie
151	Kędzierzyn Koźle – Chałupki
152	Pyskowice – Paczyna – Lubliniec
153	Toszek Północ – Rudziniec Gliwicki
154	Łazy – Dąbrowa Górnicza Towarowa
155	posterunek odgałęźny Kucelinka – Poraj
156	Bukowno – Jaworzno Szczakowa
157	Pawłowice Śląskie – Skoczów
158	Rybnik Towarowy – Chałupki
159	Orzesze – Żory – Pawłowice Śląskie – Wodzisław Śląski
160	Zawiercie ZW – Dąbrowa Górnicza Ząbkowice ZA T3
161	Katowice Szopienice Północne – Chorzów Stary
162	Dąbrowa Górnicza Strzemieszyce – Dąbrowa Górnicza Huta Katowice – Dąbrowa Górnicza
163	Sosnowiec Kazimierz – Sosnowiec Maczki
164	Chorzów Batory – Ruda Kochłowice
165	Bytom Bobrek – Bytom Karb
166	Ruda Wschodnia – Gliwice Sośnica
167	Szobiszowice – Gliwice Port
168	Gliwice – Gliwice Łabędy
169	Tychy – Orzesze Jaśkowice
170	Jastrzębie Zdrój Moszczenica – Zebrzydowice
171	Dąbrowa Górnicza Towarowa – Panewnik
172	Gierałtowice – Chudów – Orzesze
173	Rybnik – Sumina
174	Kędzierzyn Koźle – Kędzierzyn Koźle Port
175	Kłodnica (p.odg.) – Strzelce Opolskie – Kluczbork
176	Racibórz Markowice – Olza
177	Racibórz – Głubczyce
178	Zabrze Mikulczyce – Tworóg
179	Tychy – Mysłowice Kosztowy MKSB1
180	Dorota – Mysłowice Brzezinka
181	Herby Nowe – Oleśnica
182	Tarnowskie Góry – Zawiercie
183	Dąbrowa Górnicza Ząbkowice – Będzin Grodziec – Brzeziny Śląskie
184	Dąbrowa Górnicza Strzemieszyce – Sosnowiec Zagórze
185	Sosnowiec Główny – Sosnowiec Pogoń
186	Zawiercie – Dąbrowa Górnicza Ząbkowice T4
187	Ruda Kochłowice – Ruda Czarny Las – Ruda Orzegów
188	Bytom Bobrek – Zabrze Biskupice
189	Ruda Chebzie – Zabrze Biskupice
190	Bielsko-Biała Główna – Cieszyn
191	Goleszów – Wisła Głębce
192	Syrynia – Pszów
193	Racibórz Studzienna – Krzanowice Południowe
194	Pietrowice Wielkie – Kietrz
195	Kędzierzyn Koźle Zachodnie – Polska Cerekiew – Baborów
196	Olesno Śląskie – Praszka
197	Strzebiń – Woźniki Śląskie
198	Pyskowice – Pyskowice Miasto
199	Rudziniec Gliwicki – Kędzierzyn Koźle KKA
200	Gliwice – Gliwice Sośnica KWK Sośnica Makoszowy
201	Nowa Wieś Wielka – Gdynia Port
202	Gdańsk Główny – Stargard Szczeciński
203	Tczew – Kostrzyn
204	Malbork – Braniewo
205	Wielewo – Anielin Gradowo (sz)
206	Inowrocław Rąbinek – Żnin – Drawski Młyn
207	Toruń Wschodni – Malbork
208	Działdowo – Chojnice
209	Brodnica – Kowalewo Pomorskie – Bydgoszcz Wschód
210	Chojnice – Runowo Pomorskie
211	Chojnice – Kościerzyna
212	Lipusz – Bytów – Korzybie
213	Reda – Hel
214	Somonino – Kartuzy
215	Laskowice Pomorskie – Bąk
216	Działdowo – Olsztyn Główny
217	Bogaczewo – Wielkie Wieżno – Braniewo (sz)
218	Myślice – Prabuty – Kwidzyn – Szlachta
219	Olsztyn Główny – Ełk
220	Olsztyn Główny – Bogaczewo
221	Gutkowo – Braniewo
222	Małdyty – Malbork
223	Czerwonka – Ełk
224	Czerwonka – Sągnity
225	Nidzica – Wielbark
226	Pruszcz Gdański – Gdańsk Port Północny
227	Gdańsk Główny – Gdańsk Zaspa Towarowa
228	Rumia – Gdynia Port Oksywie
229	Pruszcz Gdański – Łeba
230	Wejherowo – Garczegorze
231	Inowrocław Rąbinek – Kruszwica – Mogilno
232	Jabłonowo Pomorskie – Prabuty
233	Pszczółki – Kościerzyna
234	Gdańsk Kokoszki – Stara Piła
235	Gdańsk Kokoszki – Matarnia – Gdańsk Osowa
236	Rogoźno Wielkopolskie – Bzowo Goraj
237	Lębork – Maszewo Lęborskie – Bytów
238	Opalenie Tczewskie – Smętowo
239	Mogilno – Orchowo
240	Świecie nad Wisłą – Terespol Pomorski – Złotów
241	Tuchola – Koronowo
242	Twarda Góra – Nowe
243	Skórcz – Jabłowo – Starogard Gdański
244	Morzeszczyn – Gniew
245	Aleksandrów Kujawski – Ciechocinek
246	Toruń Wschodni – Olek – Chełmno
249	Gdańsk Główny – Gdańsk Nowy Port
250	Gdańsk Główny – Rumia; Tricity Fast Urban Railroad (Polish: Szybka Kolej Miejska w Trójmieście) (1951)
251	Tama Brodzka – Iława Główna
251 (D29-1971)	Nowy Świętów – Sławniowice Nyskie
252	Zajączkowo Lubawskie – Lubawa
254	Tropy – Braniewo
256	Szymankowo – Nowy Dwór Gdański
256 (D29-1971)	Nysa – Ścinawa Mała
257	Ostróda – Miłomłyn
258	Wiatrowiec Warmiński – Sępopol
259	Kętrzyn – Karolewo BSZ – Węgorzewo
259 (D29-1971)	Otmuchów – Dziewiętlice
260	Zajączkowo Tczewskie – Pruszcz Gdański
261	Sątopy Samulewo – Reszel
262	Szczytno – Biskupiec Reszelski
263	Swarzewo – Krokowa
264	Wąbrzeźno – Wąbrzeźno Miasto
265	Zajączkowo Tczewskie – Pszczółki
271	Wrocław Główny – Poznań Główny
272	Kluczbork – Poznań Główny
273	Wrocław Główny – Szczecin Główny
274	Wrocław Świebodzki – Zgorzelec
275	Wrocław Muchobór – Gubinek
276	Wrocław Główny – Międzylesie
277	Opole Groszowice – Wrocław Brochów
278	Węgliniec – Zgorzelec
279	Lubań Śląski – Węgliniec
280	Opole Groszowice – Opole Główne
281	Oleśnica – Chojnice
282	Miłkowice – Żary – Jasień
283	Jelenia Góra – Ławszowa – Żagań
284	Legnica – Jerzmanice Zdrój – Zawidów
285	Wrocław Główny – Świdnica Przedmieście – Jedlina Zdrój
286	Kłodzko Główne – Wałbrzych Główny
287	Opole Zachodnie – Nysa
288	Nysa – Brzeg
289	Legnica – Rudna Gwizdanów
290	Mikułowa – Granica Państwa (Krzewina Zgorzelecka) – Bogatynia
291	Wałbrzych Szczawienko – Boguszów Gorce Wschód – Mieroszów
292	Jelcz Miłoszyce – Wrocław Osobowice
293	Jełowa – Kluczbork
294	Głubczyce – Racławice Śląskie
295	Węgliniec – Bielawa Dolna
296	Wielkie Piekary – Miłkowice
297	Nowy Świętów – Głuchołazy Zdrój
298	Kamienna Góra – Sędzisław
299	Kamienna Góra – Lubawka
300	Opole Główne – Opole Wschodnie
301	Opole Główne – Namysłów
302	Malczyce – Bolków – Marciszów
303	Rokitki – Chocianów – Kożuchów
304	Brzeg – Łagiewniki Dzierżoniowskie
305	Grodziec Mały – Kolsko
306	Gogolin – Krapkowice – Prudnik
307	Namysłów – Kępno
308	Kamienna Góra – Ogorzelec – Jelenia Góra
309	Kłodzko Nowe – Kudowa Zdrój
310	Kobierzyce – Piława Górna
311	Jelenia Góra – Szklarska Poręba Górna – Granica Państwa (Jakuszyce)
312	Marciszów – Krzeniów – Jerzmanice Zdrój
313	Otmuchów – Przeworno
314	Bolesławiec Wschód – Modła
315	Malczyce – Jawor
316	Złotoryja – Rokitki
317	Syców – Bukowa Śląska
318	Bielawa Zachodnia Dworzec Mały – Wolibórz - Radków
319	Strzelin – Łagiewniki Dzierżoniowskie
320	Kondratowice Dworzec Mały – Ząbkowice Śląskie Dworzec Mały
321	Grodków Śląski – Głęboka Śląska
322	Kłodzko Nowe – Stronie Śląskie
323	Nowa Wieś Grodziska – Bolesławiec Wschód
324	Krzewina Zgorzelecka – Ręczyn – Granica Państwa (Hagenwerder)
325	Baborów – Pilszcz
326	Wrocław Psie Pole – Wrocław Zakrzów – Trzebnica
327	Nowa Ruda Słupiec – Ścinawka Średnia – Radków
328	Nysa – Kałków Łąka
329	Szydłów – Gracze – Lipowa Śląska
330	Kamienna Góra – Okrzeszyn
331	Jawor – Borów – Roztoka
333	Głuchołazy – Granica Państwa → Krnov CZ
334	Kamieniec Ząbkowicki – Złoty Stok
335	Henryków Dworzec Mały – Ciepłowody
336	Mirsk – Świeradów Zdrój – Świeradów Nadleśnictwo
337	Lubań Śląski – Leśna
338	Fosowskie – Dobrodzień
339	Ruszów – Gozdnica
340	Mysłakowice – Karpacz
341	Bielawa Zachodnia – Dzierżoniów Śląski
342	Jerzmanice Zdrój – Wilków Złotoryjski – Leszczyna
343	Głuchołazy – Granica Państwa → Mikulovice CZ
344	Wilka – Zawidów
345	Kamienna Góra – Pisarzowice
d. 345	Opole Wschodnie – Opole Port
346	Granica Państwa (Liberec) – Granica Państwa (Zittau)
347	Malczyce – Malczyce Port
348	Trzciniec Zgorzelecki – Granica Państwa (Zittau)
349	Święta Katarzyna – Wrocław Kuźniki
351	Poznań Główny – Szczecin Główny
352	Swarzędz – Poznań Starołęka
353	Poznań Wschód – Żeleznodorożnyj
354	Poznań Główny POD – Piła Główna
355	Ostrów Wielkopolski – Grabowno Wielkie
356	Poznań Wschód – Bydgoszcz Główna
357	Sulechów – Luboń k. Poznania
358	Zbąszynek – Gubin
359	Leszno – Zbąszyń
360	Jarocin – Kąkolewo
361	Puszczykówko – Osowa Góra
362	Kobylin – Rawicz – Legnica Północna
363	Rokietnica – Międzychód – Skwierzyna
364	Wierzbno – Rzepin
365	Stary Raduszec – Łęknica
366	Miejska Górka – Kurzagóra – Kościan
367	Zbąszynek – Gorzów Wielkopolski
368	Szamotuły – Międzychód
369	Mieszków – Śrem – Czempiń
370	Zielona Góra – Żary
371	Wolsztyn – Żagań
372	Bojanowo – Góra Śląska – Odrzycko
373	Międzychód – Zbąszyn
374	Bzowo Goraj – Mirosław Ujski – Piła Główna
375	Międzyrzecz – Toporów
376	Kościan – Opalenica
377	Gniezno Winiary – Stawiany – Sława Wielkopolska
378	Gołańcz – Chodzież
379	Konotop – Cigacice – Sulechów
380	Jankowa Żagańska – Sanice
381	Oborniki Wielkopolskie – Wronki
382	Piętnów Legnicki – Legnica LG5
383	Ostrzeszów – Namysłaki
384	Sulechów – Świebodzin
385	Janowiec Wielkopolski – Skoki
386	Kunowice – Cybinka
387	Wschowa – Lipinka Głogowska
388	Konin – Pątnów – Kazimierz Biskupi
389	Żagań – Jankowa Żagańska
393	Cigacice – Cigacice Port
394	Poznań Krzesiny – Kobylnica
395	Zieliniec – Kiekrz
401	Szczecin Dąbie SDB – Świnoujście Port
402	Koszalin – Goleniów
403	Piła Północ – Ulikowo
404	Szczecinek – Kołobrzeg
405	Piła Główna – Ustka
406	Szczecin Główny – Trzebież Szczeciński
407	Wysoka Kamieńska – Kamień Pomorski – Trzebiatów
408	Szczecin Główny – Stobno Szczecińskie
409	Szczecin Gumieńce – Granica Państwa (Tantow)
410	Grzmiąca – Grotniki Drawskie – Choszczno – Kostrzyn
411	Stargard Szczeciński – Pyrzyce – Siekierki
412	Wałcz – Krzyż
413	Człuchów – Przechlewo – Słosinko
414	Gorzów Wielkopolski Zieleniec – Chyrzyno
415	Gorzów Wielkopolski – Gorzów Wielkopolski Wieprzyce – Myślibórz
416	Wałcz Raduń – Wierzchowo Pomorskie
417	Sobieradz – Granica PLK – Szczecin Dąbie – Szczecin Lotnisko
418	Sławno – Darłowo
419	Pyrzyce – Gryfino
420	Worowo – Wysoka Kamieńska
421	Połczyn Zdrój – Smardzko – Świdwin
422	Pyrzyce – Głazów
423	Chwarstnica – Swobnica
424	Goleniów – Maszewo
425	Łubowo – Borne Sulinowo
426	Strzelce Krajeńskie Wschód – Strzelce Krajeńskie
427	Mścice – Mielno Koszalińskie
428	Szczecin Dąbie SDB – Szczecin Podjuchy
429	Stobno Szczecińskie – Dołuje – Nowe Warpno
430	Barnówko – Kostrzyn
d. 430	Stare Bielice – Skwierzyna
431	Police – Police Chemia
432	Szczecin Wstowo – Szczecin Turzyn
433	Szczecin Główny SG – Szczecin Gumieńce
440	Warszawa Służewiec – Warszawa Lotnisko Chopina (Warsaw Chopin Airport)
445	Warszawa Zachodnia – Warszawa Aleje Jerozolimskie
446	Terespol – Granica Państwa (Briest) (sz)
447	Warszawa Zachodnia – Grodzisk Mazowiecki
448	Warszawa Zachodnia – Warszawa Rembertów
449	Warszawa Rembertów – Zielonka
450	Kobylany – Wólka (sz)
451	Białowieża Towarowa – Białowieża Pałac
452	Warszawa Wschodnia Osobowa – Warszawa Grochów T4G
453	Terespol – Granica Państwa (Briest) T3
454	Chotyłów Bór – Chotyłów
455	Wólka – Kobylany (sz)
456	Warszawa Praga WPC – Legionowo T3
457	Warszawa Włochy – Warszawa Włochy T3Ł
458	Łódź Fabryczna – Łódź Widzew
480	Układy Torowe Sektora Taboru
501	Warszawa Jagiellonka – Warszawa Targówek
502	Warszawa Michałów – Warszawa Wschodnia Towarowa
503	Warszawa Wileńska Marki – Warszawa Wschodnia Towarowa
506	Warszawa Antoninów – Warszawa Gocławek
507	Warszawa Główna Towarowa – Warszawa Gołąbki
509	Warszawa Główna Towarowa – Warszawa Gdańska
510	Warszawa Główna Towarowa – Warszawa Aleje Jerozolimskie
511	Chotomów – Legionowo Piaski
512	Pruszków – Komorów
513	Jasienica – Tłuszcz
514	Prostyń Bug – Treblinka
515	Białystok – Białystok Starosielce
516	Turczyn – Białystok Starosielce
517	Papiernia – Las Suwalski
518	Łęgówek – Lesk
520	Doły – Ujrzanów
521	Mińsk Mazowiecki R4 – Mińsk Mazowiecki R101
522	Mińsk Mazowiecki R102 – Mińsk Mazowiecki R45
523	Trzaskoniec – Poważe
524	Jaźwiny – Żołnierka
525	Czachówek Południowy – Czachówek Wschodni
526	Czachówek Zachodni – Czachówek Południowy CZP11
527	Czachówek Południowy CZP11 – Czachówek Wschodni
528	Czachówek Zachodni – Czachówek Południowy
529	Miedniewice – Skierniewice
530	Skierniewice Park – Skierniewka
531	Łowicz Główny ŁG1 – Łowicz Przedmieście
532	Łowicz Główny – Łowicz Przedmieście
533	Arkadia – Placencja
534	Koluszki – Mikołajów
535	Zieleń – Koluszki
536	Słotwiny – Bęzelin
537	Żakowice Południowe – Słotwiny
538	Pękowice – Bęzelin
539	Łódź Kaliska Towarowa – Retkinia
540	Łódź Chojny – Łódź Widzew
541	Łódź Widzew – Łódź Olechów
542	Borszewice – Zduńska Wola Karsznice
543	Gajewniki – Dionizów
544	Zamków – Borysławice
545	Warszawa Michałów – Warszawa Grochów
546	Warszawa Wschodnia Towarowa – Warszawa Rembertów T6M
547	Warszawa Podskarbińska – Warszawa Antoninów
561	Zadębie – Adampol
562	Adampol – Lublin Tatary LTB
563	Rejowiec Zachodni – Rejowiec Południowy
564	Kolonia (Zamojska) – Siedliska
565	Charzewice – Stalowa Wola Rozwadów Towarowy
566	Skarżysko-Kamienna SKA – Skarżysko Kamienna SKE
567	Piaski – Kielce Herbskie
568	Sitkówka Nowiny – Szczukowice
569	Radkowice – Brzeziny
570	Psary – Starzyny
571	Czarnca – Knapówka
572	Włoszczowa Północ – Żelisławice
573	Idzikowice – Radzice
574	Zapowiedź – Idzikowice
575	Szeligi – Marków
576	Wolanów – Rożki
577	Garbatka Letnisko – Sieciechów
578	Garbatka Letnisko – Wysokie Koło
579	Stawy – Dęblin DB
580	Wieprz – Wisła
581	Świdnik – Świdnik Port Lotniczy
601	Kraków Przedmieście – Kraków Główny Towarowy
602	Kraków Przedmieście – Kraków Olsza
603	Kraków Prokocim Towarowy PRD – Kraków Bonarka
604	Kraków Płaszów – Kraków Prokocim Towarowy PRA
605	Kraków Płaszów – Kraków Prokocim Towarowy PRB
606	Kraków Prokocim Towarowy PRB – Kraków Bieżanów
607	Raciborowice – Dłubnia
608	Podgrabie – Rudzice
609	Tarnów Filia – Tarnów Wschód
610	Dębica Towarowa – Dębica Wschodnia
611	Rzeszów Zachodni – Rzeszów Staroniwa
612	Przeworsk – Przeworsk Gorliczyna
613	Żurawica ŻRC – Hurko
614	Żurawica ŻRB – Hurko (sz)
615	Przemyśl Główny – Przemyśl Bakończyce
616	Jelinka – Kornie
617	Zagórz R46 – Zagórz R101
618	Jasło Towarowe – Sobniów
619	Stróże SR4 – Stróże SR3
620	Basznia – Kaplisze
651	Radoszowy – Gottwald
652	Katowice Muchowiec KMB – Podg Staszic – Katowice Murcki
653	Katowice Muchowiec – Katowice Ochojec KOC
654	Szabelnia – Katowice Szopienice Północne
655	Mysłowice MWB – Katowice Muchowiec KMA
656	Katowice – Brynów
657	Katowice Szopienice Północne – Katowice Muchowiec KMA
658	Stawiska Sk1 R3 – Stawiska Sk1 R2
659	Będzin – Sosnowiec Główny T3
660	Sosnowiec Południowy – Sosnowiec Główny
661	Okradzionów – Kozioł
662	Dąbrowa Górnicza Huta Katowice – Dąbrowa Górnicza Piekło
663	Sosnowiec Kazimierz SKZ2 – Sosnowiec Kazimierz SKZ1
664	Sławków Południowy – Sławków
666	Sosnowiec Maczki SMA – Jaworzno Szczakowa JSC
667	Sosnowiec Maczki – Długoszyn
668	Jaworzno Szczakowa JSB – Długoszyn
669	Jaworzno Szczakowa JSE – Pieczyska T4P
670	Borowa Górka – Jaworzno Szczakowa T4B
671	Maciejów Północny – Gliwice GLA – Gliwice T3
672	Maciejów Północny – Zabrze Makoszowy Kopalnia
673	Maciejów Północny – Gliwice T3
675	Szobiszowice – Gliwice Port
676	Gliwice Sośnica R1 – Gliwice Sośnica GSB – KWK Sośnica
677	Zabrze Makoszowy Kopalnia – Mizerów
678	Borki – Katowice Dąbrówka Mała
679	Chałupki – Granica Państwa (Chałupki)
680	Kędzierzyn Kolźle KKD – Kłodnica (p.odg.)
681	Nowa Wieś – Stare Koźle
682	Nowa Wieś – Kędzierzyn Koźle KKB
683	Czarków – Borowiany
684	Borowiany – Krupski Młyn
685	Droniowiczki – Jawornica
686	Herby Nowe – Liswarta
687	Kalina – Herby Stare
688	Rybnik Towarowy RTA – Rybnik RBC
689	Studzionka – Dębina
690	Jastrzębie Zdrój Moszczenica R22 – Jastrzębie Zdrój Moszczenica R21
691	Nędza Wieś – Turze
693	Zabrzeg – Bronów R4
694	Bronów – Bieniowiec
695	Cieszyn R103 – Cieszyn R102
696	Tychy Miasto – Tychy Lodowisko
698	Mysłowice Kosztowy R103 – Mysłowice Kosztowy R205
699	Oświęcim OwC Oświęcim OWC1
700	Częstochowa – Częstochowa Stradom
701	Częstochowa – Kucelinka
702	Częstochowa Towarowa – Częstochowa Stradom
703	Kucelinka – Częstochowa Towarowa CTA
704	Herby Stare – Herby Nowe
705	Zawiercie R125 – Zawiercie R97
706	Katowice Muchowiec KMB – Katowice Ochojec KOC1
707	Katowice Muchowiec KMB – Staszic
709	Kędzierzyn Koźle – Stare Koźle
710	Bytom – Bytom Bobrek
711	Maciejów Północny – Gliwice T4
712	Maciejów Południowy – Gliwice GLA
713	Katowice – Chorzów Batory
714	Jaworzno Szczakowa JSE – Pieczyska T3P
715	Borowa Górka – Jaworzno Szczakowa T3B
716	Piekary Śląskie Szarlej – Barbara
717	Górki Ściernie – Fiat Auto Poland
719	Jęzor Centralny JCA – Sosnowiec Jęzor GT
720	Sosnowiec Jęzor – Sosnowiec Jęzor GT
721	Gdańsk Południowy – Motława Most
722	Gdańsk Zaspa Towarowa ZP1 – Gdańsk Wiślany
723	Gdynia Chylonia – Gdynia Port GPF
724	Gdynia Port GPD – Gdynia Port GPO
725	Gdynia Główna Osobowa R20 – Gdynia Port GPB
726	Tczew R52- Zajączkowo Tczewskie ZTB
727	Tczew – Malinowo
728	Tczew R60 – Zajączkowo Tczewskie ZTB
729	Górki – Zajączkowo Tczewskie
730	Zajączkowo Tczewskie ZTD – Tczew Suchostrzygi
731	Malinowo – Zajączkowo Tczewskie ZTB
732	Tczew Południe – Tczew Wisła
733	Suchy Las – Wielbark Las
734	Nieszawka – Toruń Towarowy TRB
735	Górki – Zajączkowo Tczewskie ZTA
736	Grębocin – Katarzynka
737	Ponętów – Barłogi
738	Lipusz R32 – Lipusz R31
739	Zduńska Wola Karsznice – Zduńska Wola
740	Ponętów – Zamków
741	Mimowola – Jaksice
742	Inowrocław – Inowrocław Rąbinek
743	Lipowa Tucholska – Szlachta
744	Lipowa Tucholska – Szlachta Zachód
745	Bydgoszcz Główna – Czyżkówko
746	Gdynia Główna Osobowa – Gdynia Port GPB
750	Wrocław Brochów WBB – Wrocław Stadion
751	Wrocław Gądów – Wrocław Zachodni
752	Wrocław Gądów – Wrocław Popowice WP3
753	Wrocław Grabiszyn – Wrocław Gądów
754	Wrocław Popowice WP1 – Wrocław Popowice WP
755	Wrocław Popowice WP – Wrocław Popowice WP3
756	Wrocław Stadion – Wrocław Popowice WP2
757	Wrocław Świebodzki – Wrocław Muchobór
758	Wrocław Stadion – Wrocław Muchobór
759	Wrocław Gądów – Wrocław Nowy Dwór
760	Wrocław Świebodzki – Wrocław Gądów
761	Wrocław Grabiszyn – Wrocław Świebodzki WSB
762	Wrocław Osobowice WO2 – Jeżyny
763	Wrocław Brochów WBB – Wrocław Główny WGA
764	Siechnice – Wrocław Brochów WBBD
765	Wrocław Brochów WBB – Lamowice
766	Łukanów – Dąbrowa Oleśnicka
767	Kuniów (p.odg.) – Smardy
768	Ligota Dolna (p.odg.) – Gotartów (p.odg.)
769	Opole Zachodnie OP2 – Opole Zachodnie OPZ1
771	Świdnica Przedmieście – Świdnica Miasto
772	Strzegom Międzyrzecze – Strzegom Miasto
773	Boguszów Gorce – Boguszów Gorce Towarowy
774	Marciszów Górny – Krużyn
775	Jezierzany – Miłkowice
776	Marciszów – Wojcieszów Górny
777	Bolesławiec Wschód – Bolesławiec
778	Krysin – Zgorzelec Miasto
779	Studniska – Las
780	Wilka 2 – Wilka 1
781	Pieńsk – Granica Państwa
782	Małowice Wołowskie – Iwno
786	Granica Państwa (Krzewina Zgorzelecka) – Bogatynia
801	Poznań Starołęka PSK – Poznań Górczyn
802	Poznań Starołęka PSK – Luboń k. Poznania
803	Poznań Piątkowo (posterunek ruchu) – Suchy Las
804	Poznań Antoninek – Nowa Wieś Poznańska
805	Swarzędz – Stary Młyn
806	Poznań Franowo PFD – Nowa Wieś Poznańska
807	Sokołowo Wrzesińskie – Września
808	Września – Podstolice
809	Barłogi – Borysławice
810	Zduńska Wola – Dionizów
811	Stary Staw – Franklinów
812	Kępno R5 – Hanulin R39
813	Kępno Kp1 – Hanulin R5
814	Kępno R38 – Hanulin R2
815	Durzyn – Krotoszyn
816	Krotoszyn – Osusz
817	Leszno Grzybowo – Leszno
818	Leszno LOG – Marysiewice
819	Chlastawa – Kosieczyn
820	Chlastawa – Dąbrówka Zbąska
821	Jerzmanice Lubuskie – Rzepin RZB11
822	Rzepin RZB – Drzeńsko
823	Poznań Franowo PFD – Stary Młyn
824	Pokrzywno – Poznań Franowo PFD
825	Jarocin SKP1 – Jarocin R285
826	Jarocin R10 – Jarocin R16 T111
827	Kostrzyn R5 – Kostrzyn R208 T13/15A
829	Warszawa Praga R95 – Warszawa Praga R96
830	Łódź Olechów – Łódź Olechów (ŁOA – ŁOB – ŁOC)
831	Łódź Olechów ŁOC – Łódź Olechów ŁOA
832	Łódź Olechów – Łódź Olechów (ŁOC – ŁOLAS – Elektrowozownia)
833	Warszawa Praga WPE42- Warszawa Praga (WPE 42 – WPE 41 – WPB – WPC)
834	Warszawa Praga – Warszawa Praga (WPE 42 – WPA – WPB – WPC)
835	Warszawa Praga WPE42 – Warszawa Praga (WPE42 – WPA)
836	Białystok R4 – Białystok R192
837	Białystok R613 – Białystok R192
838	Warszawa Praga WPE41 – Warszawa Praga WPD
839	Warszawa Grochów R5 – Warszawa Grochów R535
840	Kielce Herbskie KHA – Kielce Herbskie KHB
841	Skarżysko Kamienna SKA – Skarżysko Kamienna R405
842	Kielce Herbskie KHA R230 – Kielce Herbskie R237
845	Inowrocław Rąbinek – Inowrocław Chemia
846	Wisła Most – Gdańsk Grobla
847	Konopat – Bocznica ZP
848	Zarzecze – Biały Ług
851	Szczecin Wstowo – Szczecin Gumieńce
854	Szczecin Port Centralny SPB – Dziewoklicz
855	Regalica – Szczecin Port Centralny SPA
857	Szczecin Dąbie SDA – Szczecin Dąbie SDC
860	Trzebinia TSA – Trzebinia
861	Żurawica ŻRA – Żurawica ŻRB
862	Rybnik Towarowy RTB – Radlin Obszary
863	Knurów – KWK Budryk
864	Katowice Ligota – KWK Wujek
865	Magdalenka – Małaszewicze Centralne (MSC)
866	Magdalenka – Małaszewicze Rozrządowa (MSR)
867	Małaszewicze Centralne (MSC) – Małaszewicze (MSE)
868	Warszawa Szczęśliwice R8000 – Warszawa Szczęśliwice
869	Wałbrzych Szczawienko – Wałbrzych Zespół Bocznic
870	Rozbark – ZGH Orzeł Biały
871	Wanda – KWK Michał
872	Nowa Wieś – Kędzierzyn Koźle KKC
873	Pawłowice Śląskie – Pawłowice Górnicze
874	Kleszczów – Ciepłownia
875	Wodzisław Śląski – KWK 1 Maja
876	Wodzisław Śląski – Radlin Marcel
877	Radlin Obszary – Radlin Marcel
878	Suszec Rudziczka – Suszec Kopalnia – KWK Krupiński
880	Czerwionka – KWK Dębieńsko – Czerwionka Dębieńsko
881	Kaczyce – KWK Morcinek
882	Oświęcim – KWK Czeczott
883	Mysłakowice Kosztowy MKSC – KWK Wesoła
884	Lędziny – KWK Ziemowit
885	Nowy Bieruń – KWK Piast
886	Dwory – Zakłady Chemiczne Dwory – Dwory-Monowice
887	Jup R1 – KWK Julian
888	Bytom Północny – KWk Centrum
889	Chudów – Ornontowice Budryk
890	Bierawa – Zakłady Azotowe Kędzierzyn
891	Raszowa – Zakłady Koksownicze Zdzieszowice
893	Zabrze Makoszowy – KWK Makoszowy – Zabrze Makoszowy Kopalnia
894	Ruda Bielszowice – KWK Halemba
895	Gottwald – KWK Kleofas
896	Panewnik – KWK Śląsk T2
897	Panewnik – KWK Śląsk T1
898	Staszic – KWK Staszic
899	Sosnowiec Dańdówka – KWK Sosnowiec
900	Ostrołęka – Goworki
901	Warszawa Wschodnia Towarowa – Warszawa Rembertów T5M
902	Warszawa Wschodnia Osobowa – Warszawa Antoninów T2P
903	Warszawa Podskarbińska – Warszawa Grochów T3G, 5G
904	Zaborze – Raniewo (sz)
905	Kowalewo – Bogdanów (sz)
906	Chotyłów – Mętraki
907	Mętraki – Raniewo
908	Chotyłów – Podsędków
909	Bogdanów – Kowalewo
910	Nowosady – Chryzanów
911	Bernadczyzna – Oskierki
912	Zabłotczyzna – Oskierki (sz)
913	Narewka – Planta
914	Narewka – Wiącków
915	Mikłaszewo – Planta (sz)
916	Siemianówka – Wiącków (sz)
917	Łódź Widzew – WGW Janów
918	Warszawa Bema – Warszawa Zachodnia
919	Warszawa Zachodnia – Warszawa Ochota Postojowa
920	Warszawa Zachodnia – Warszawa Zachodnia R217-578, R218-579
921	Kutno – Kutno Azory Lokomotywownia
922	Sokółka – Buchwałowo
923	Buchwałowo S – Buchwałowo Wschód (sz)
924	Bocznica Straszewo N
925	Bocznica Grzybowce N
926	Bocznica Straszewo S (sz)
927	Bocznica Grzybowce S (sz)
928	Sokole – Sokole Naftobaza
929	Bocznica Krzywólka
930	Lublin – Lublin Tatary
931	Hrubieszów Miasto – Hrubieszów Towarowy
932	Olendry – Jeziórko
933	Chmielów k. Tarnobrzega – Machów
934	Małogoszcz MŁ1 – Małogoszcz Park Towarowy
935	Lublin LBA – Lublin LBC
936	Skarżysko Kamienna SKB – Skarżysko Kamienna SY
937	Warszawa Okęcie – Jeziorna
938	Warszawa Jelonki – Radiowo
939	Łódź Dąbrowa PODG – Łódź Dąbrowa Przemysłowa (EC4)
940	Kraków Nowa Huta NHB – Kraków Krzesławice
941	Kraków Nowa Huta NHE – Kościelniki T1001
942	Kościelniki – Kraków Nowa Huta NHB T1002
943	Kraków Nowa Huta NHA – Kraków Nowa Huta NHC
944	Kraków Nowa Huta NHA – Kraków Nowa Huta NHD
945	Kraków Prokocim PRD – Kraków Prokocim PRB
947	Kraków Olsza – Kraków Łęg
948	Kraków Towarowy – Kraków Główny Osobowy T3
949	Kraków Towarowy – Kraków Główny Osobowy T4
950	Tarnowskie Góry TGA1 – Tarnowskie Góry TGE
951	Tarnowskie Góry TGA – Tarnowskie Góry TGE
954	Tarnowskie Góry TGB – Tarnowskie Góry TGD (Grupa torów C)
956	Kędzierzyn Koźle KKC – Kędzierzyn Koźle KKB 12
957	Rybnik – Rybnik Towarowy RTF
958	Rybnik Towarowy RT11 – Rybnik Towarowy RTB
959	Rybnik Towarowy RTD – Rybnik Towarowy RTE
960	Gdynia Główna Osobowa – Gdynia Postojowa
961	Gdynia Postojowa GP14 – Gdynia Port GPC
962	Gdynia Główna Osobowa – Gdynia Port GPF
963	Gdynia Główna Osobowa R64 – Gdynia Główna Osobowa R95
964	Gdynia Postojowa GP15 – Gdynia Chylonia
965	Wisła Most – Gdańsk Kanał Kaszubski
966	Działdowo R102 – Działdowo R101
967	Iława R2 – Iława R144
968	Iława R1 – Iława R45
969	Jaworzno Szczakowa – Szyb Sobieski
970	Mietków – Mietków Bocznica WKSM
971	Lubin Górniczy – Lubin Kopalnia PLK
972	Pawłowice Małe – Pawłowice Małe Fabryczny
973	Bolesławiec – Wizów
974	Rakowice Żwirownia – Rakowice ZKGM
975	Węgliniec SKP – Węgliniec WG
976	Boguszów Gorce Zachód – Czarny Bór
977	Czarnowąsy – Bocznica Elektrowni Opole
978	Przywory Opolskie – Chorula Cementownia Górażdże
979	Tarnowskie Góry TGC – Tarnowskie Góry TGC
980	Czerwieńsk Osobowy CK – Czerwieńsk Towarowy T100
981	Rzepin RZA R3 – Rzepin RZB11 R103 T44
982	Zbąszynek R463 – Zbąszynek R47 T185a/117/8
983	Jarocin R286 – Jarocin R152 T25
984	Poznań Franowo PFB – Poznań Franowo PFA T209/200/150/103
987	Tarnów Mościce – Mościce Azoty
988	Przeworsk R66 – Przeworsk Towarowy R112
989	Hurko – Medyka Towarowa R34
990	Szczecin Port Centralny SPA – Szczecin Port Centralny SPD32
991	Szczecin Port Centralny SPA – Szczecin Port Centralny Lokomotywownia
992	Szczecin Port Centralny SPA – Szczecin Port Centralny SPC
993	Szczecin Port Centralny SPB – Szczecin Port Centralny SPB Tor 400
994	Szczecin Port Centralny SPB17 – Szczecin Port Centralny SPB15
995	Szczecin Port Centralny SPD31 – Nabrzeże Starówka T846
996	Lubiewo – Świnoujście SIB
997	Świnoujście SIB – Baza Promów Morskich
998	Szczecin Wstowo – Elektrownia Pomorzany
999	Piła Główna – Piła Północ

== See also ==
- Liste der Eisenbahnstrecken in Polen (at German Wikipedia) for additional details
