= Jan Franciszek Macha =

Polish Roman Catholic priest killed in WWII

Blessed Jan Franciszek Macha
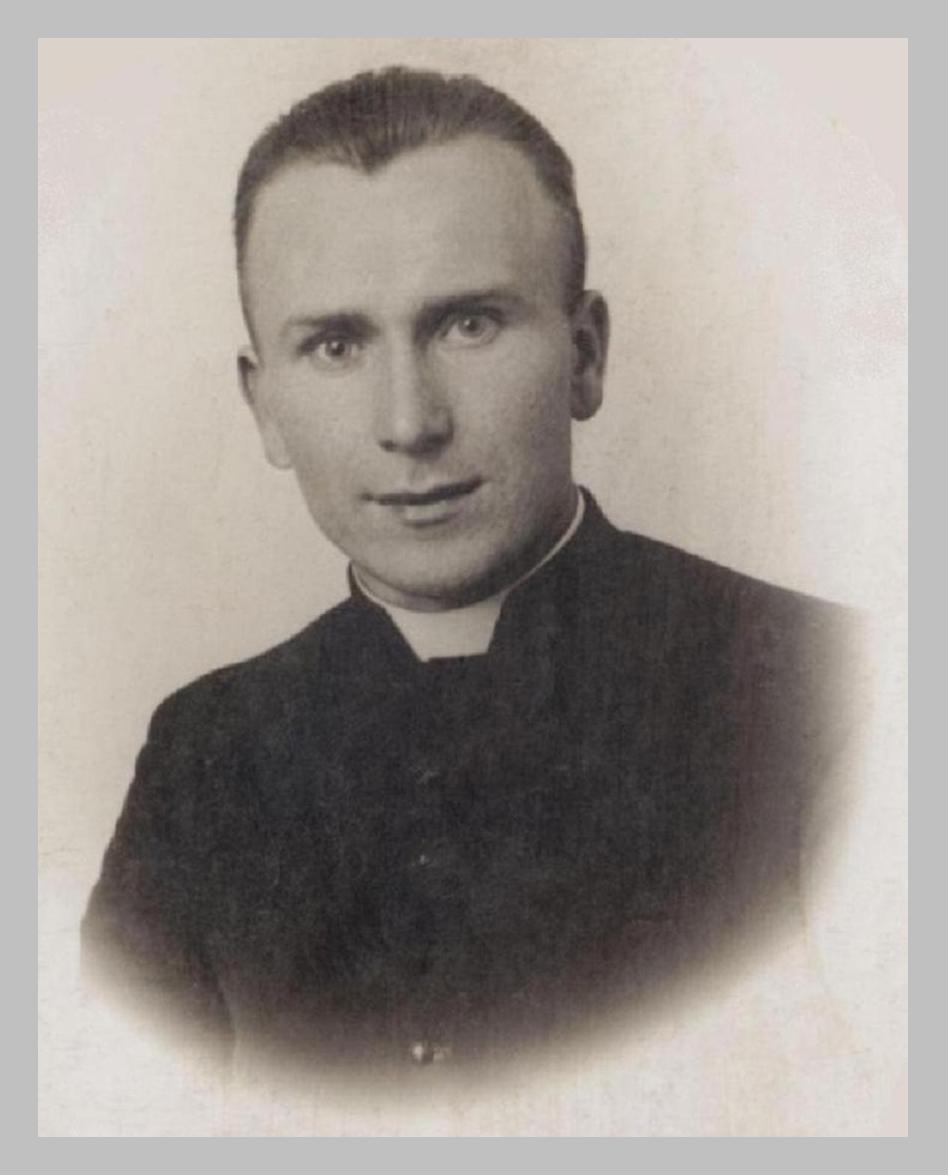
- Macha in 1940

Martyr
- Born: 18 January 1914; Chorzów, Vistula Land
- Died: 3 December 1942 (aged 28); Katowice, Poland
- Venerated in: Roman Catholic Church
- Beatified: 20 November 2021, Cathedral of Chrystus Król, Katowice, Poland by Cardinal Marcello Semeraro
- Feast: 2 December

Jan Franciszek Macha (18 January 1914 – 3 December 1942) was a Polish Roman Catholic priest. He was once rejected for ecclesial studies so studied law for some months before being accepted as a seminarian. He was ordained just months before the outbreak of World War II and was assigned to a parish church as a vicar on 1 September 1939 just as the Nazi forces invaded Poland in an attack that sparked the conflict. Macha aided student and scout activities and set about providing material assistance to families who lost sons and husbands to the war. He was arrested in 1942 and was moved from prison to prison before being executed by the guillotine.

Pope Francis beatified Macha on 20 November 2021.

== Life ==
Jan Macha was born in Chorzów as the first of four children born to Paweł Macha and Anna Cofałka. He was often referred to as "Hanik" at home. His two sisters were Róża and Maria and his brother was Piotr.

He did his grammar schooling in his hometown from 1921 to 1924 and then right after leaving made an application to the Silesian Theological College in 1933. But Macha was rejected due to the high number of candidates and so decided to do his education at the Jagiellonian in the law department. In 1934 he commenced his ecclesial studies (succeeding in his second application) and became known among his fellow seminarians for his deep devotion and for his empathetic traits that made him a liked peer. He was elevated to the diaconate at a Mass held on 1 May 1938 in Katowice. Macha received his ordination from Bishop Stanisław Adamski in Katowice on 25 June 1939 and from 1 September 1939 onwards (the time that the Nazi forces invaded Poland) served as a joint vicar for the Saint Josef parish in Ruda Śląska. Macha celebrated his first Mass in the Saint Mary Magdalene parish church in his hometown on 27 June 1939. It was just before his first Mass - as he vested for it - he told his sister Róża that he would die soon and that it would not be a natural death. He often visited families in his parish area and once the war broke out would render spiritual and material assistance to those families that lost their husbands and sons in the fighting. He also raised funds for poorer families and would preside over marriages as well as providing religious instruction to children. Macha also involved himself in student and scout initiatives. In the beginning of 1940 the Gestapo summoned him to interrogate him about his activities and released him.

Macha was arrested on 5 September 1941 in a Gestapo raid at a train station in Katowice and was detained in Mysłowice until 13 November 1941 and it was during his imprisonment that he was interrogated. Macha was humiliated during these interrogations and would often plead to God to forgive his persecutors for their actions. Macha sent his first letter to his relatives on 18 September 1941 and in late June 1942 was moved to a prison on Mikołowska Street in Katowice; he was soon sentenced to death on 17 July 1942. The news of this sentence spread quick among his parishioners and relatives so much so that his mother travelled to Berlin in August 1942 failing to secure a pardon for her son.

Macha made his last confession to the priest Joachim Beslera during the night preceding his execution and also wrote a farewell letter to his relatives. He also wrote a small note that said: "Priest Jan Macha executed on 2 XII 1942" despite the fact he was executed at 12:15am on 3 December at the guillotine. It is believed that his remains were cremated since his remains were never recovered. His relatives asked for his remains for a proper burial but the Nazis refused this and the S.S. - upon learning of an impending funeral service - restricted certain elements of the ceremonial.

== Beatification ==
The diocesan process was launched on 24 November 2013 in Katowice archdiocese and it later closed on 4 September 2014. Pope Francis approved the cause on 28 November 2019 and confirmed that Macha died in odium fidei ("in hatred of the faith"). The beatification was celebrated on 20 November 2021. The postulator for the cause is Damian Bednarski.
