= Gdańsk Olszynka railway station =

Railway station in Gdańsk, Poland

Coordinates: 54.3375°N 18.6789°E

Gdańsk Olszynka
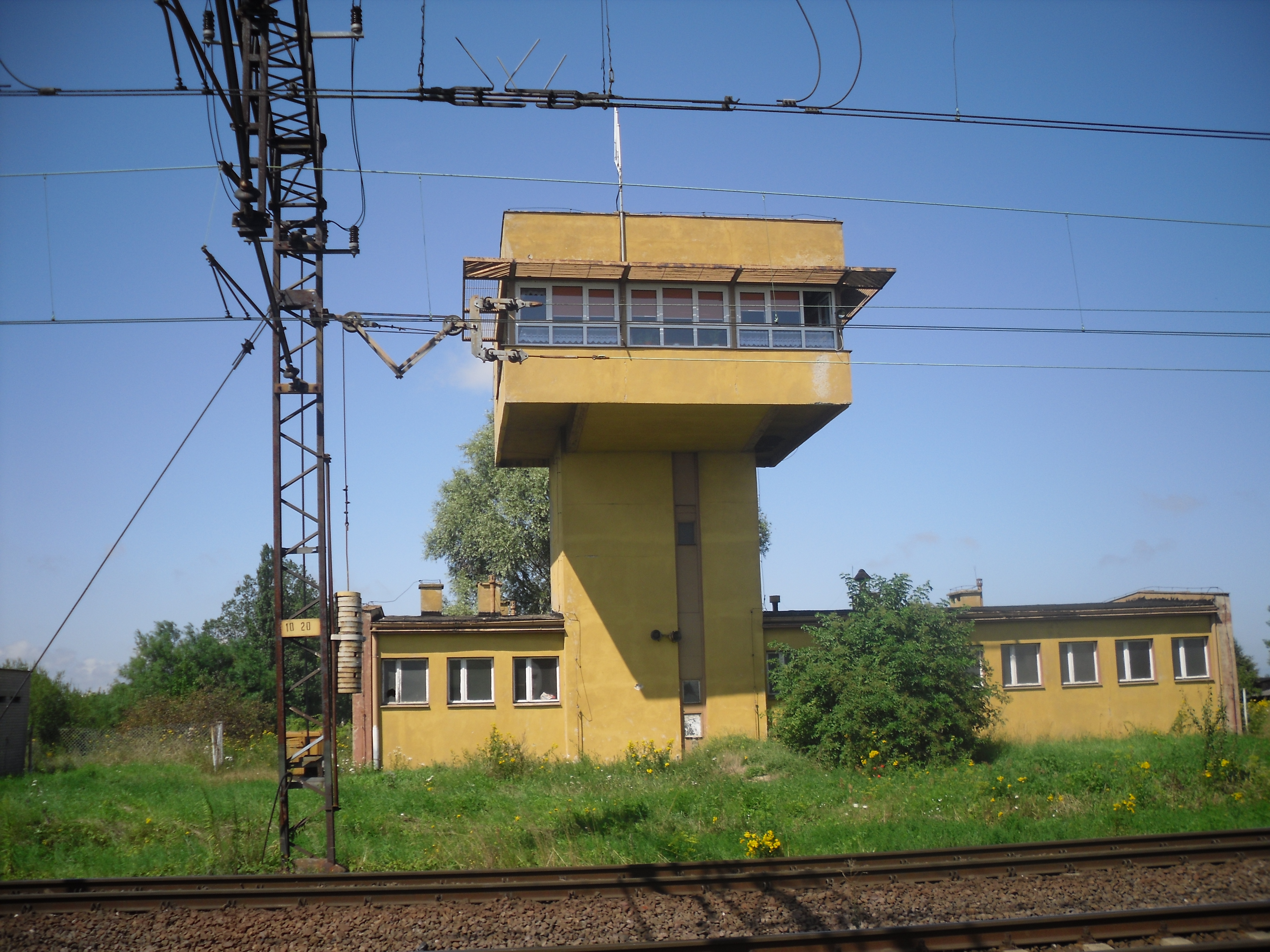

General information
- Location: None, Olszynka, Gdańsk; Poland
- Owner: Polskie Koleje Państwowe S.A.
- Platforms: None

Construction
- Structure type: Building: No; Depot: Never existed Water tower: No
Location

Gdańsk Olszynka is a former railway station in Gdańsk, Poland.

== Lines crossing the station ==
Start station	End station	Line type
Pruszcz Gdański	Gdańsk Port Północny	Freight
