= Maszewo Lęborskie railway station =

Railway station in Maszewo Lęborskie, Poland

Coordinates: 54.4628°N 17.7330°E

Maszewo Lęborskie
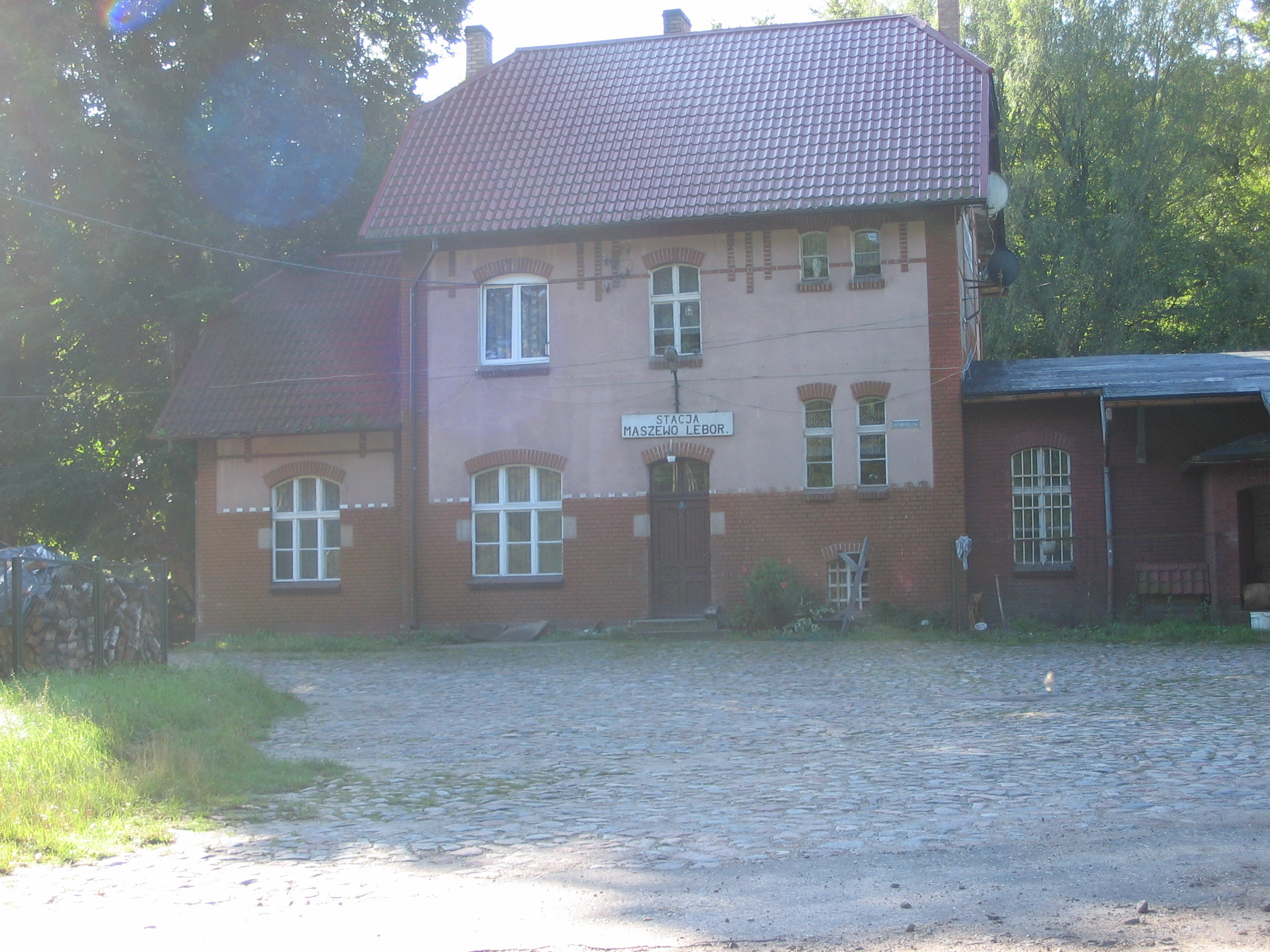

General information
- Location: Maszewo Lęborskie; Poland
- Owner: Polskie Koleje Państwowe S.A.
- Platforms: 2

Construction
- Structure type: Building: Yes (no longer used); Depot: Never existed Water tower: Never existed

History
- Former names: Groß Massow until 1945
Location

Maszewo Lęborskie (German: Bahnhof Groß Massow) is a non-operational PKP railway station in Maszewo Lęborskie (Pomeranian Voivodeship), Poland.

== Lines crossing the station ==
Start station	End station	Line type
Lębork	Bytów	Closed
