= Kraków Główny–Kraków Lotnisko railway =

Railway line in Kraków, Poland

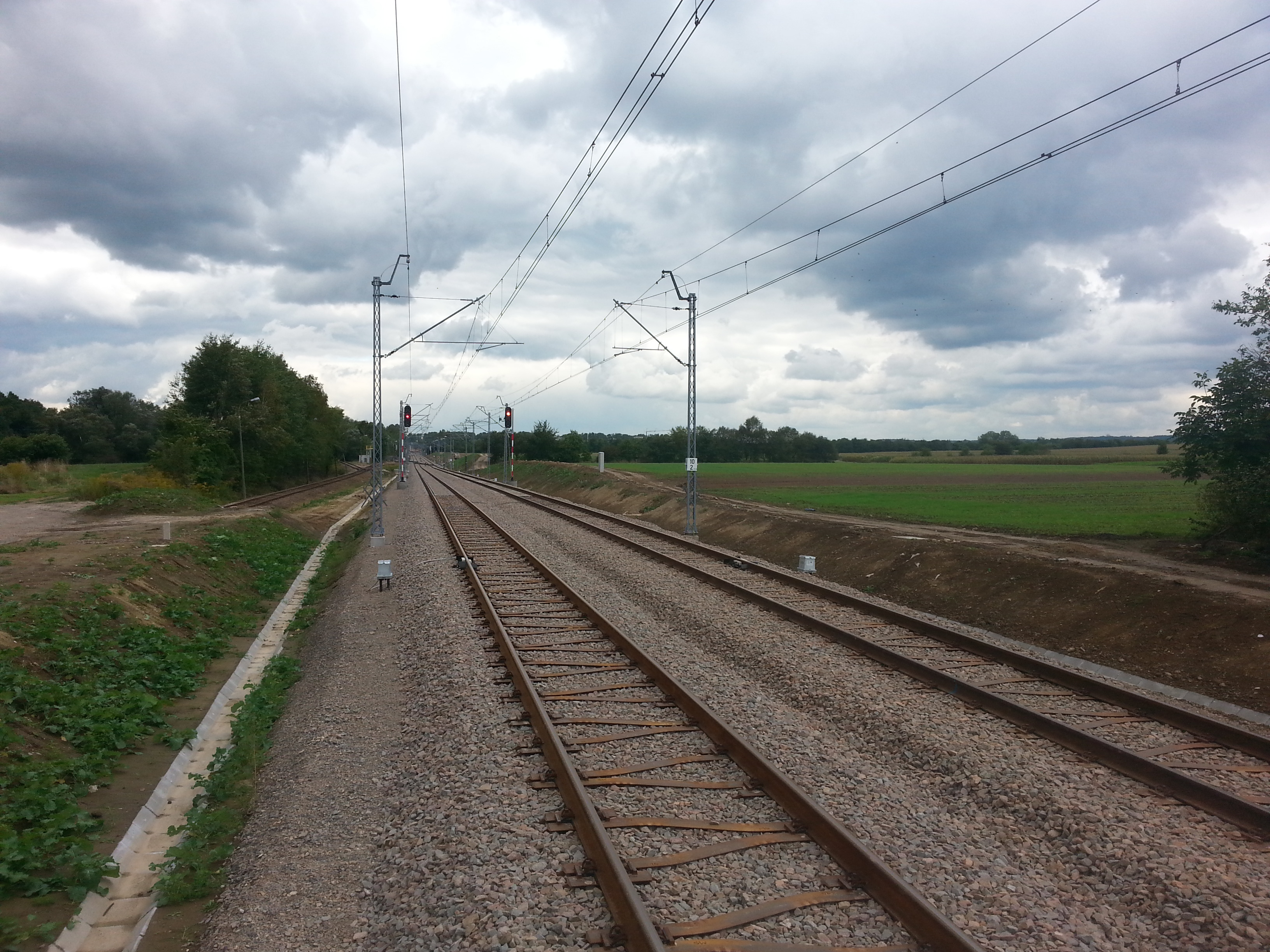
- View from the Kraków Olszanica railway station towards the airport

Overview
- Line number: 118
- Termini: Kraków Główny; Kraków Lotnisko

History
- Opened: 1951

Technical
- Line length: 11.960 km (7.432 mi)
- Track gauge: 1,435 mm (4 ft 8 1/2 in)
- Operating speed: 80 km/h (50 mph)
Route map

Kraków Główny–Kraków Lotnisko railway is an electrified, mostly double-track, secondary railway line of national importance in the Lesser Poland Voivodeship. It allows travel by train from the center of Kraków to the Kraków John Paul II International Airport. Passenger services are operated by Lesser Poland Railways. The line also features a siding for Orlen.

== Route ==
Kraków Główny–Kraków Lotnisko railway starts at the northern junction of the Kraków Główny railway station (km 0.056), where trains use a collision-free track layout in relation to Dąbrowa Górnicza Ząbkowice–Kraków Główny railway. In the area of the Kraków Główny KGA railway station station, the former additional tracks no. 3 and 6 were adjusted to become the main tracks of the Kraków Główny–Kraków Lotnisko railway. The line then runs through the Kraków Łobzów railway station, where two platforms are located. Beyond Łobzów, the line uses the former track no. 1 of the Kraków Mydlniki–Kraków Bieżanów railway (the so-called small orbital line), which runs over a new viaduct above Armii Krajowej Street (before which the Kraków Bronowice railway station is located), while track no. 2 runs along the former ramp.

== Technical parameters ==
The maximum speed along the entire line is 80 km/h for passenger trains and railbuses, and 60 km/h for freight trains. The entire line is classified as D3 (the maximum axle load is 221 kN/axle, and the maximum linear load is 71 kN/m).

== History ==
In 1951, Polish State Railways built a line connecting the Kraków Mydlniki railway station with Balice. On 25 May 2006, the company Polregio launched the Balice Express service, connecting Kraków Główny railway station with a station in Balice, where a special higher fare was applied. Later, the name of the service was changed to REGIOairport.

On 26 September 2013, PKP Polskie Linie Kolejowe signed a contract with the Italian company Astaldi to modernize the line. Due to the reconstruction, all services operated by railbuses were canceled from 1 February 2014. As part of the modernization, three new stops were built (Kraków Młynówka, Kraków Zakliki, and Kraków Olszanica), the final station was moved closer to the airport terminal, the Kraków Łobzów railway station was modernized, a second track was constructed, and the line was electrified. On 13 September 2015, the first passenger train passed through the line after the renovation as part of the ceremonies marking the completion of the first section of the new passenger terminal at the airport. On 14 September, the Provincial Building Supervision Inspectorate issued a permit for the use of the renovated line. Ultimately, on 28 September, the service was launched, and the new carrier became Lesser Poland Railways.

== Operating points ==
Name of the station	Type	Number of platform edges
Kraków Główny	Railway station	10
Kraków Główny KGA	Railway station	0
Kraków Łobzów	Passenger stop	4
Kraków Łobzów	Branch post	0
Kraków Bronowice	Passenger stop	4
Kraków Mydlniki	Railway station	2
Kraków Młynówka	Passenger stop	2
Kraków Zakliki	Passenger stop	2
Kraków Olszanica	Passenger stop	2
Kraków PKN Orlen	Railway siding post	0
Kraków Balice MPL	Station siding	0
Kraków Lotnisko	Railway station	2

== Train operations ==
Trains on the line operate on the Fast Urban Railway in the Kraków Agglomeration service route Kraków Lotnisko–Kraków Główny–Wieliczka Rynek-Kopalnia, operated by Lesser Poland Railways. Trains run every half hour; the journey from Kraków Lotnisko railway station to Kraków Główny railway station takes 18 minutes.
