= Żywiec railway station =

Railway station in Żywiec, Poland

Żywiec
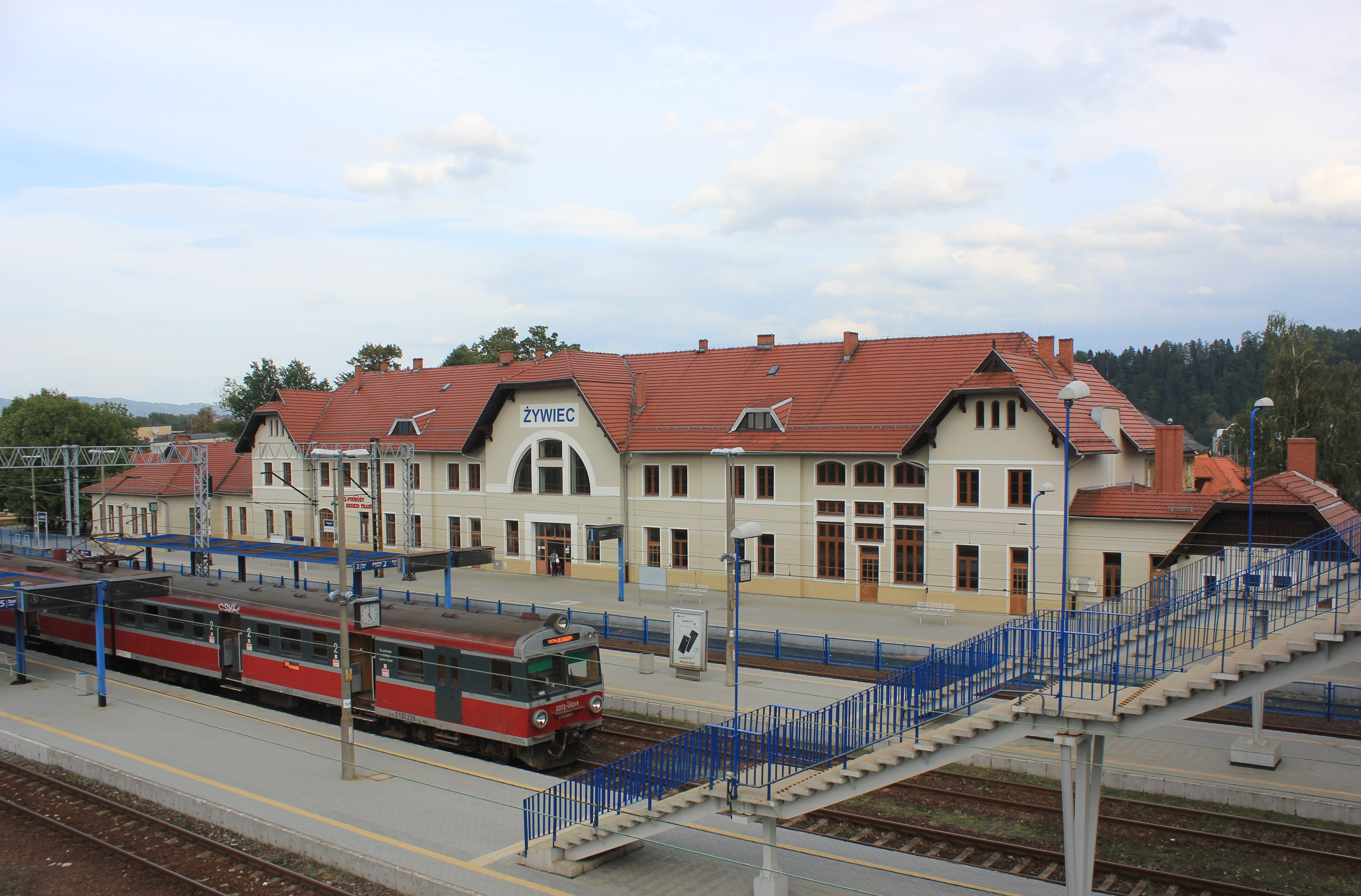
- Żywiec railway station in 2017

General information
- Location: ul. Dworcowa 52, Żywiec; Silesian Voivodeship; Poland
- Coordinates: 49°40′48″N 19°11′10″E
- Owner: Polish State Railways
- Lines: Skawina–Żywiec; Katowice–Zwardoń
- Platforms: 3
- Tracks: 5

History
- Opened: 1878; 148 years ago
- Former names: Saybusch-Zablocie; Saybusch-Żywiec; Saybusch

Passengers
- 2,000–3,000 per day (2022)
Location
- Location within Poland Location within Silesian Voivodeship

Żywiec is a railway station in Żywiec, Silesian Voivodeship, Poland. It is located in the Zabłocie district of the town, on Dworcowa Street. It is classified by PKP as an agglomeration station.

== History ==
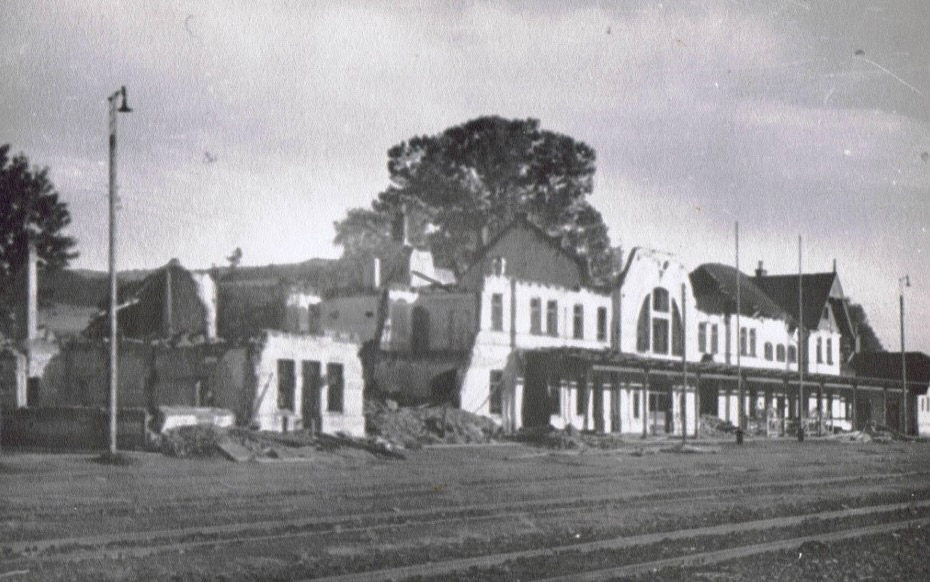
Station building destroyed in 1945

The station was opened in 1878, along a railway to Bielsko. Since 1884, it was a part of the Galician Transversal Railway. During the Second World War, in April 1945, German units destroyed the station building while retreating from the town. It was rebuilt in 1949.

== Connections ==
- 97 Skawina – Żywiec
- 139 Katowice – Zwardoń
