= Wyczerpy-Aniołów =

- Dzielnica of Częstochowa
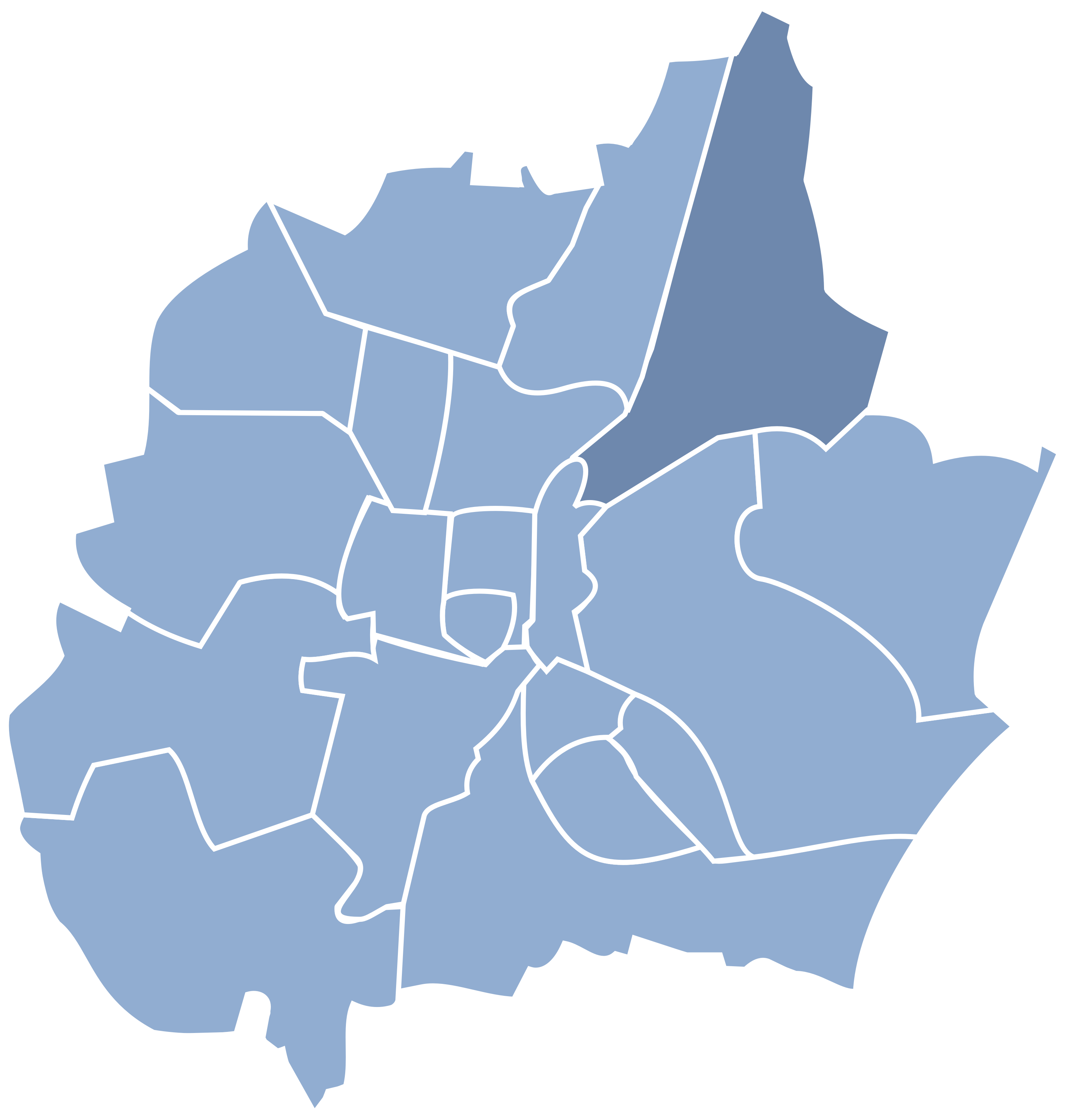
- Location of Wyczerpy-Aniołów within Częstochowa
- Coordinates: 50.838°N 19.159°E
- Country: Poland
- Voivodeship: Silesian
- County/City: Częstochowa

Area
  - Total: 16.62 km^{2} (6.42 sq mi)

Population (2014)
  - Total: 9,182
  - Density: 552.5/km^{2} (1,431/sq mi)
- Time zone: UTC+1 (CET)
  - Summer (DST): UTC+2 (CEST)
- Area code: (+48) 34

Wyczerpy-Aniołów is a dzielnica (district) of Częstochowa located in north-east part of the city. The district has an area of 16.62 km^{2} and in 2014 had 9,182 inhabitants.

Through the district run the national road 1, the national road 91, and the railway line 1 (with the Częstochowa Aniołów station).

== History ==
The village Wyczerpy was founded in 1356. The village was growing along the route from Częstochowa to Warsaw. Over time, the village split into Wyczerpy Górne (Upper Wyczerpy) and Wyczerpy Dolne (Lower Wyczerpy). In the second half of the 19th century there was created two factories: glassworks and chemical plants

Wyczerpy Dolne was incorporated into Częstochowa in 1952 and Wyczerpy Górne was incorporated in 1977.
