= Suwałki railway station =

Railway station in Suwałki, Poland

Suwałki
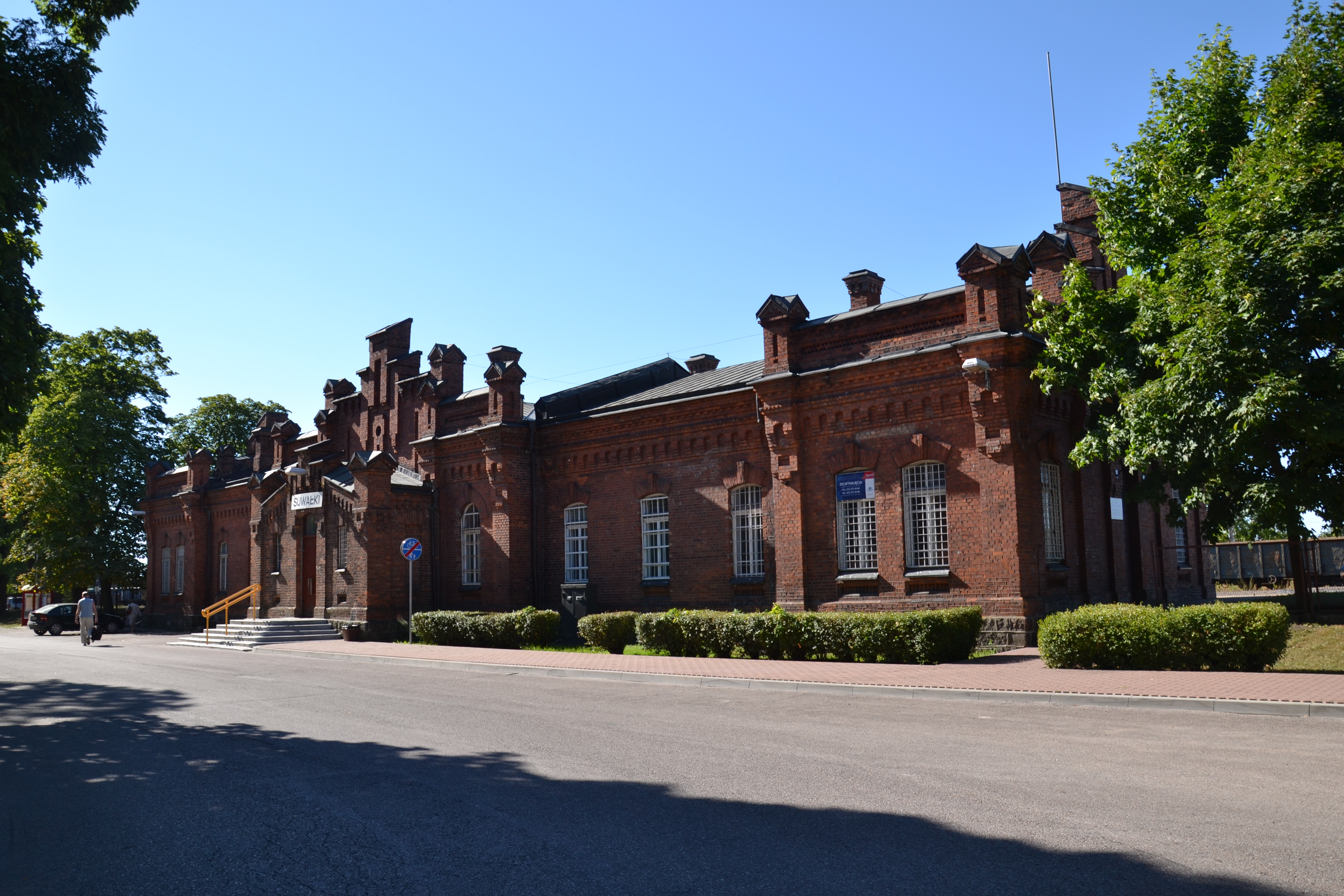
- Station building

General information
- Location: Suwałki, Podlaskie Voivodeship; Poland
- Owner: Polish State Railways
- Lines: Olecko–Suwałki railway; Sokółka–Suwałki; Suwałki–Trakiszki
- Platforms: 4

History
- Opened: 1899
- Former names: Suwalken (before 1941); Sudauen (1941–1945)
Location

Suwałki (Polish: Suwalken) is the main railway station in the city of Suwałki, located in the Podlaskie Voivodeship of north eastern Poland. As of 2012, it is served by Polregio (regional services) and international trains to and from Lithuania. In 2017, the station served 300–499 passengers per day.

The station building stands unchanged to this day. It is one of the main and one of the oldest unchanged since the construction monuments of Suwałki.

The station opened in 1899, primarily to cater to the requirements of the Russian army. The establishment of the station catalysed a swift urban expansion.
