= Kraków Mydlniki railway station =

Railway station in Kraków, Poland

Coordinates: 50.0834°N 19.8589°E

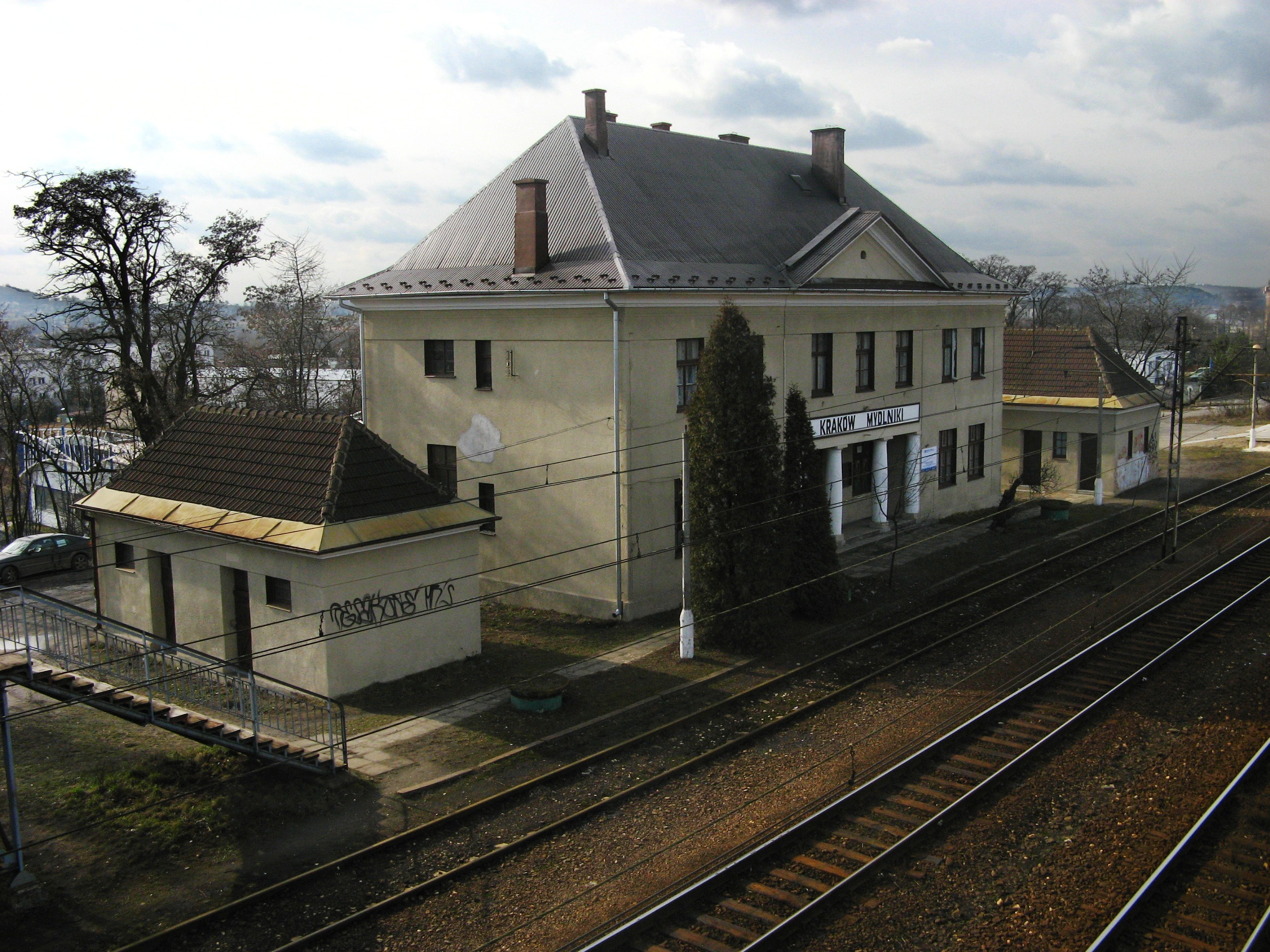
Kraków Mydlniki railway station

Kraków Mydlniki is a railway station in the Bronowice district of Kraków, Poland, located in the neighbourhood of Mydlniki, northwest of the city centre. The station, with its historic building, lies within the Tenczynek Landscape Park (Tenczyński Park Krajobrazowy) protected area with numerous summer visitors, because the Park is also the location of a medieval Tenczyn Castle built as a seat of the powerful Tęczyński family. It fell into ruin during the Deluge in mid-17th century, after being pillaged and burned by Swedish-Brandenburgian forces looking for the Polish Crown Jewels and the rumored treasures of the Tęczyński family. Within the Landscape Park are five nature reserves.

The station serves the PKP rail line 95 between Katowice to the west (1), and Kraków Balice to the east (2); more specifically:

1. PKP rail line 133 Dąbrowa Górnicza Ząbkowice - Kraków Główny, 70.7 kilometres (43.9 mi)
2. PKP rail line 118 Kraków Mydlniki - Kraków Balice, 5.0 kilometres (3.1 mi).

== Train services ==
The station is served by the following services:

- Regional services (PR) K3 Katowice — Kraków Główny — Tarnów — Dębica — Rzeszów
- Regional services (PR) K32 Kraków Główny — Trzebinia — Oświęcim — Czechowice-Dziedzice
- Regional services (KMŁ) SKA3 Oświęcim (Auschwitz) — Trzebinia — Kraków Główny — Tarnów
- Regional services (KŚ) S3 Katowice — Mysłowice — Trzebinia — Krzeszowice — Kraków Główny

PKP Intercity, K33 , and S34 services pass through this station without stopping.

Preceding station	Polregio	Following station
Kraków Mydlniki Wapiennik towards Katowice	K3	Kraków Bronowice towards Kraków Główny or Dębica
Kraków Bronowice towards Kraków Główny	K32	Kraków Mydlniki Wapiennik towards Czechowice-Dziedzice
Preceding station	KMŁ	Following station
Kraków Mydlniki Wapiennik towards Oświęcim (Auschwitz)	SKA3	Kraków Bronowice towards Kraków Główny or Tarnów
Preceding station	KŚ	Following station
Kraków Mydlniki Wapiennik towards Katowice	S3	Kraków Bronowice towards Kraków Płaszów
