= Leśna railway station =

Disused railway station in Leśna, south-western Poland

Leśna
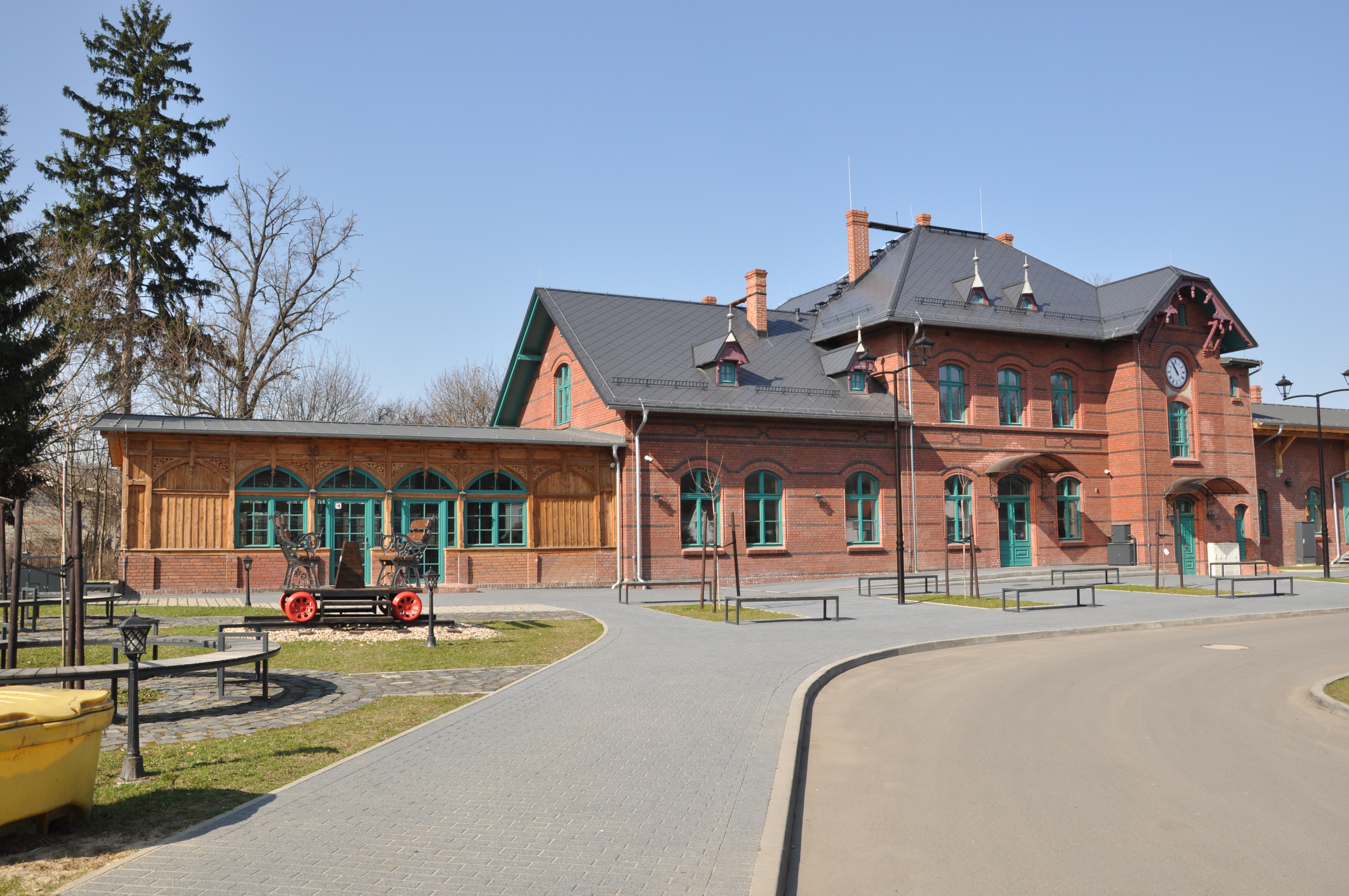
- Renovated station building in March 2026

General information
- Location: Leśna, Lower Silesian Voivodeship; Poland
- Coordinates: 51°01′39″N 15°15′45″E
- Owner: Polskie Koleje Państwowe S.A.
- Line: Lubań–Leśna railway
- Platforms: 1

History
- Opened: 15 May 1896
- Former names: Marklissa (before 1945); Leszna nad Gwizdem (1945–1947)

Key dates
- 30 September 1991: Line closed for freight traffic only
Location

Leśna (German: Marklissa) is a disused railway station on the Lubań–Leśna railway in the town of Leśna, Lubań County, within the Lower Silesian Voivodeship in south-western Poland.

Since 1991, the Lubań–Leśna railway has been closed for only freight trains, special trains, and tourist heritage railway trains.

== History ==
The station opened as Marklissa on 15 May 1896. Electrification of the Lubań–Leśna railway was completed on 3 April 1923.

After World War II, the area was placed under Polish administration. As a result, the line was taken over by Polish State Railways and the station was renamed to Leszna nad Gwizdem. The station was renamed once again to its current name, Leśna, on 1 February 1947.

The Lubań–Leśna railway was likely the only line on which Polish State Railways immediately resumed services in 1945 using former German electric trains. However, this did not last long as soon after the Red Army dismantled the local power plant in Sieniawka, which supplied electricity to the entire Silesian Mountain Railway.

Before any decisions were made about restoring the power plant, the Red Army dismantled the overhead wires, un-electrifying the line. The Red Army also stole all the German electric trains and transported them into the Soviet Union. This was done under 'war reparations' of World War II.

== Gallery ==
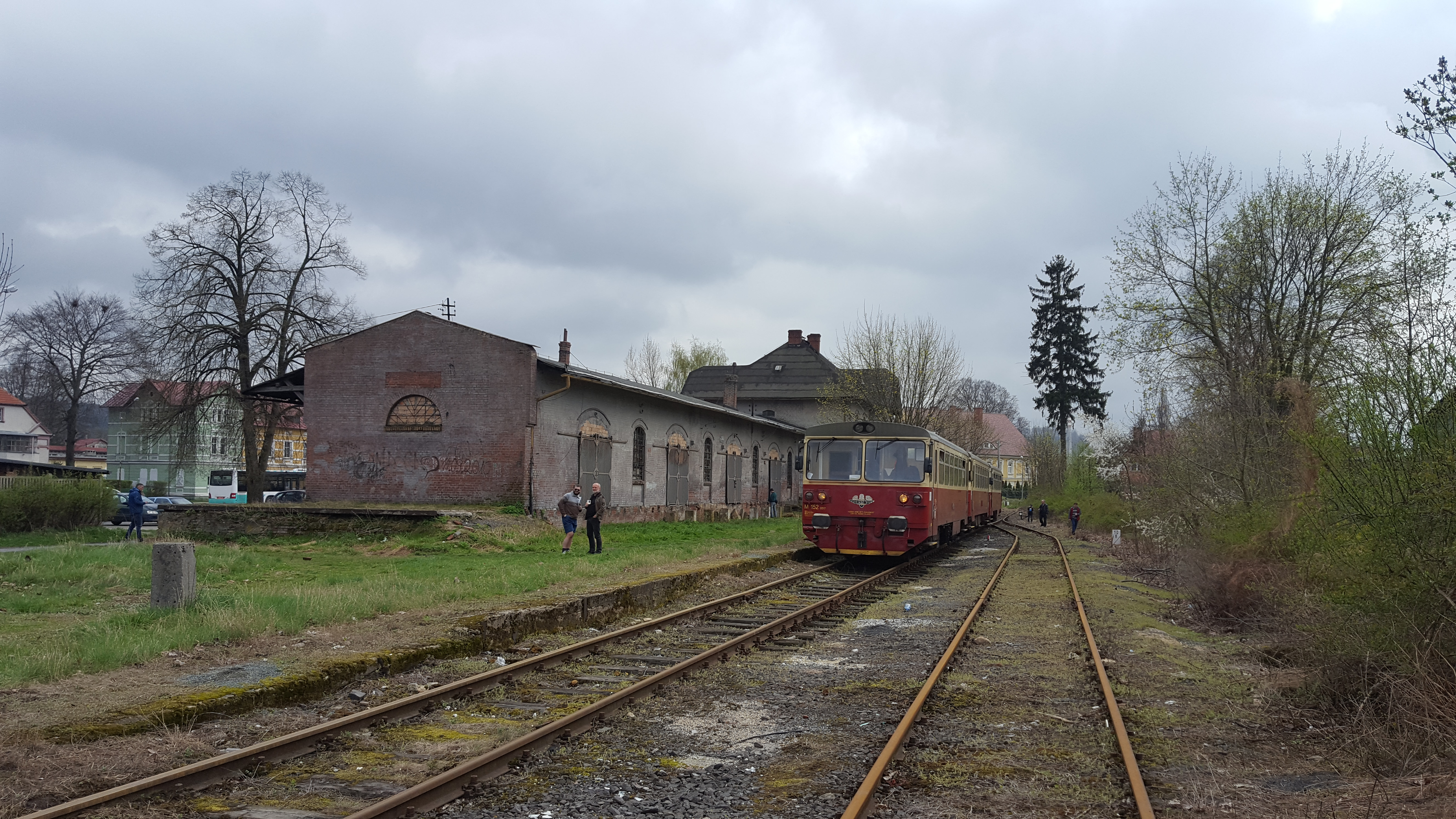
Tourist train at the station in 2017

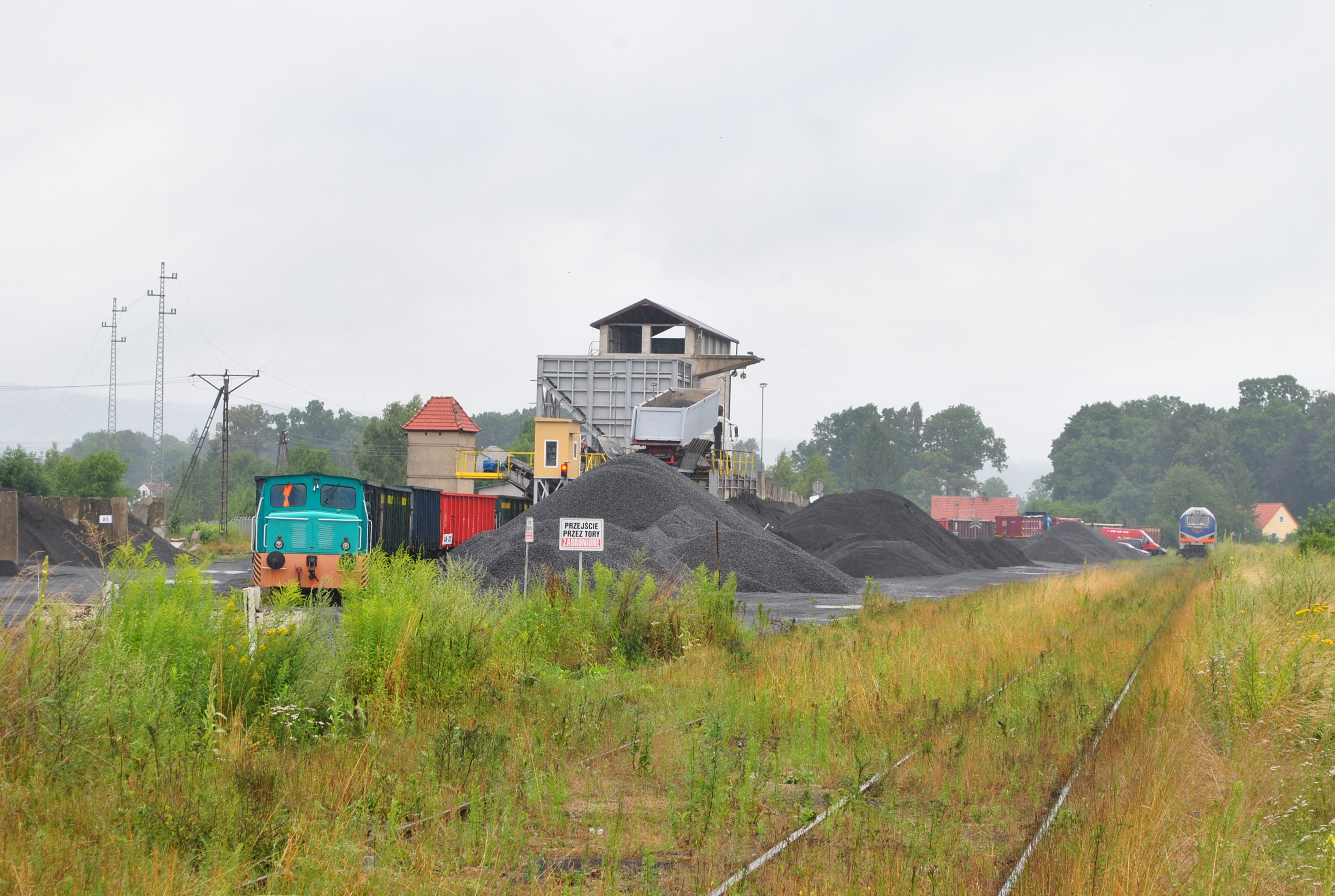
Sidings used by freight trains
