= Szczecin Gumieńce–Gumieńce-Tantow railway =

Railway crossing and border between Poland and Germany

Railway line No. 409
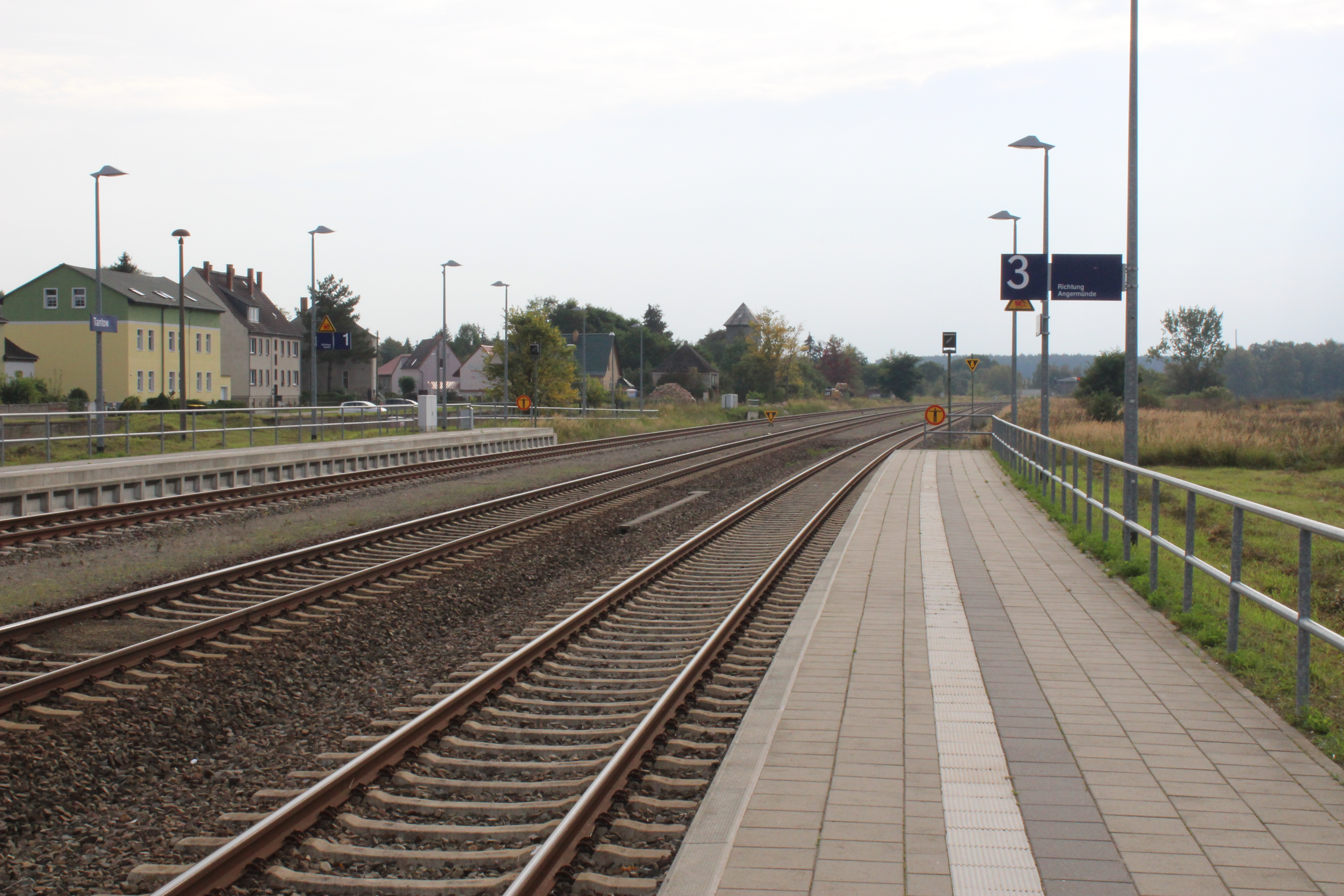

Overview
- Status: in use
- Locale: Poland
- Termini: Szczecin Gumieńce; Gumieńce - Tantow border crossing

Service
- Route number: 409

History
- Opened: 1843; 183 years ago

Technical
- Line length: 9.954 km (6.185 mi)
- Track gauge: 1,435 mm (4 ft 8 1/2 in) standard gauge
- Electrification: none (planned)
- Operating speed: 120 km/h (75 mph)

The Szczecin-Gumieńce-Tantow border crossing is a Polish-Germen railway border. The railway is a single-track and within the Polish section of the Berlin–Szczecin railway. It connects the Szczecin Gumieńce station with the state border, formerly the Gumieńce-Tantow border crossing.

== Modernization and electrification ==
The upgraded tracks allow for passenger trains to travel at a maximum speed of 160 km/h and fright trains to move at a maximum speed of 120 km/h.

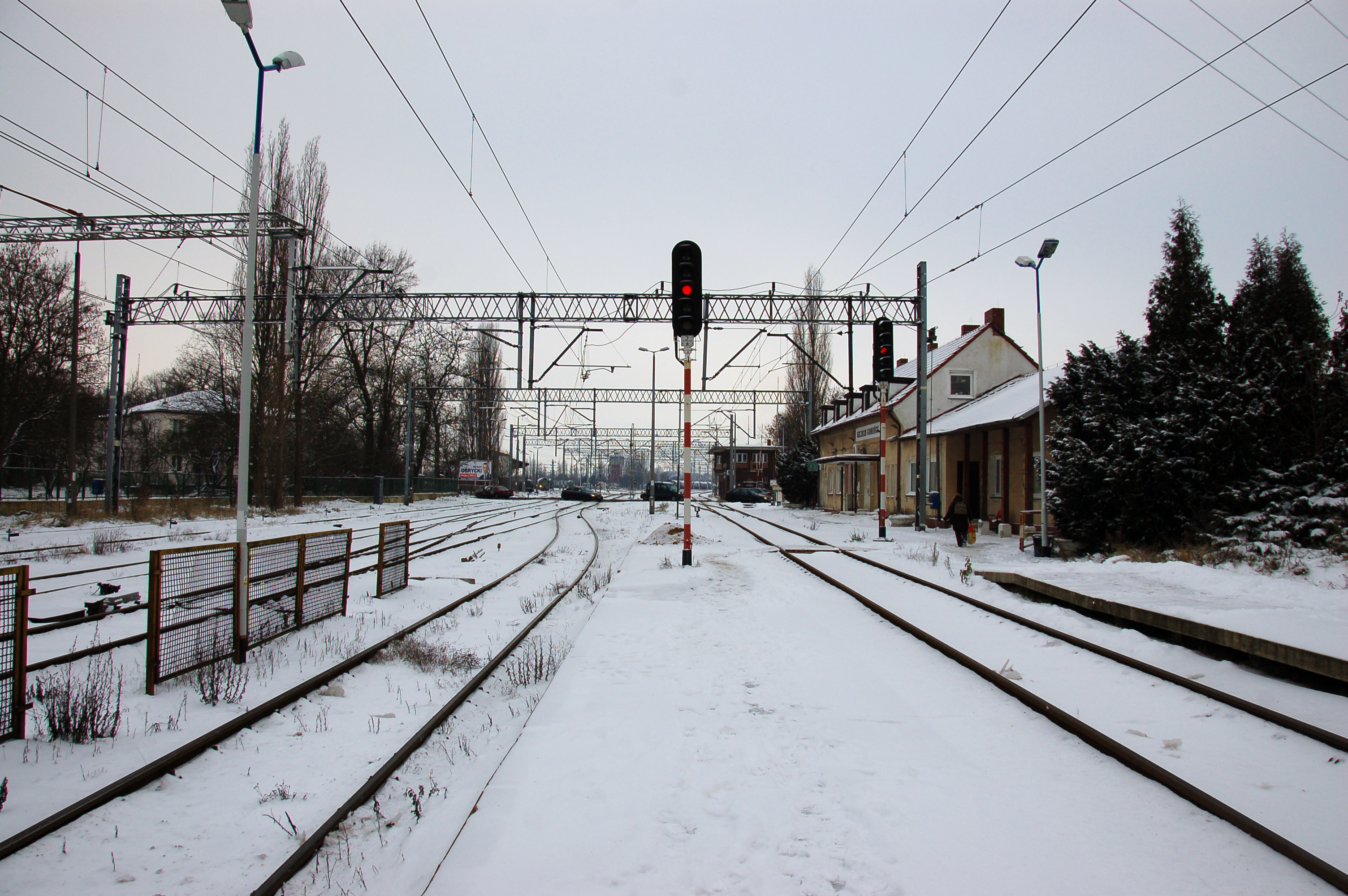

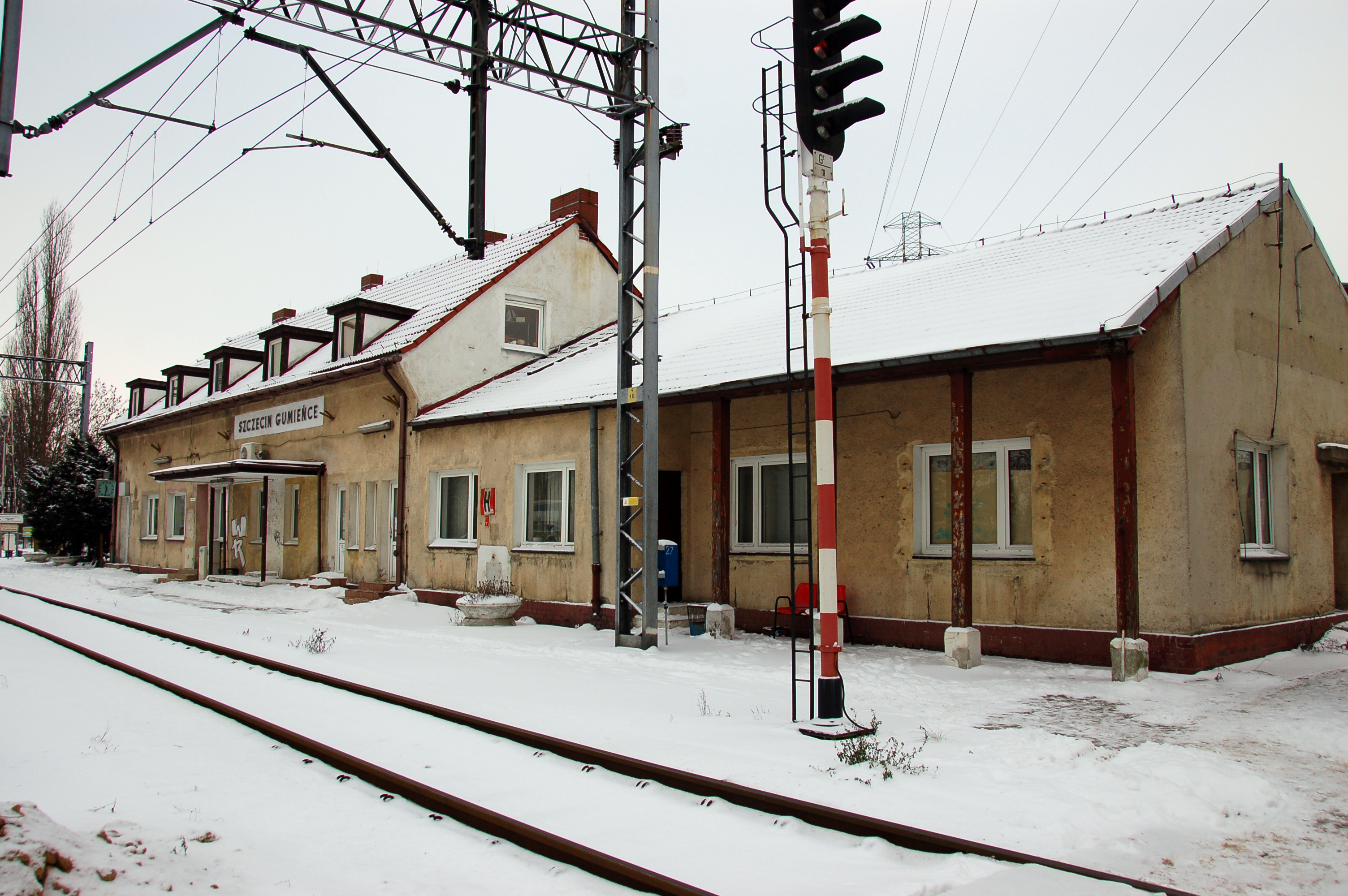

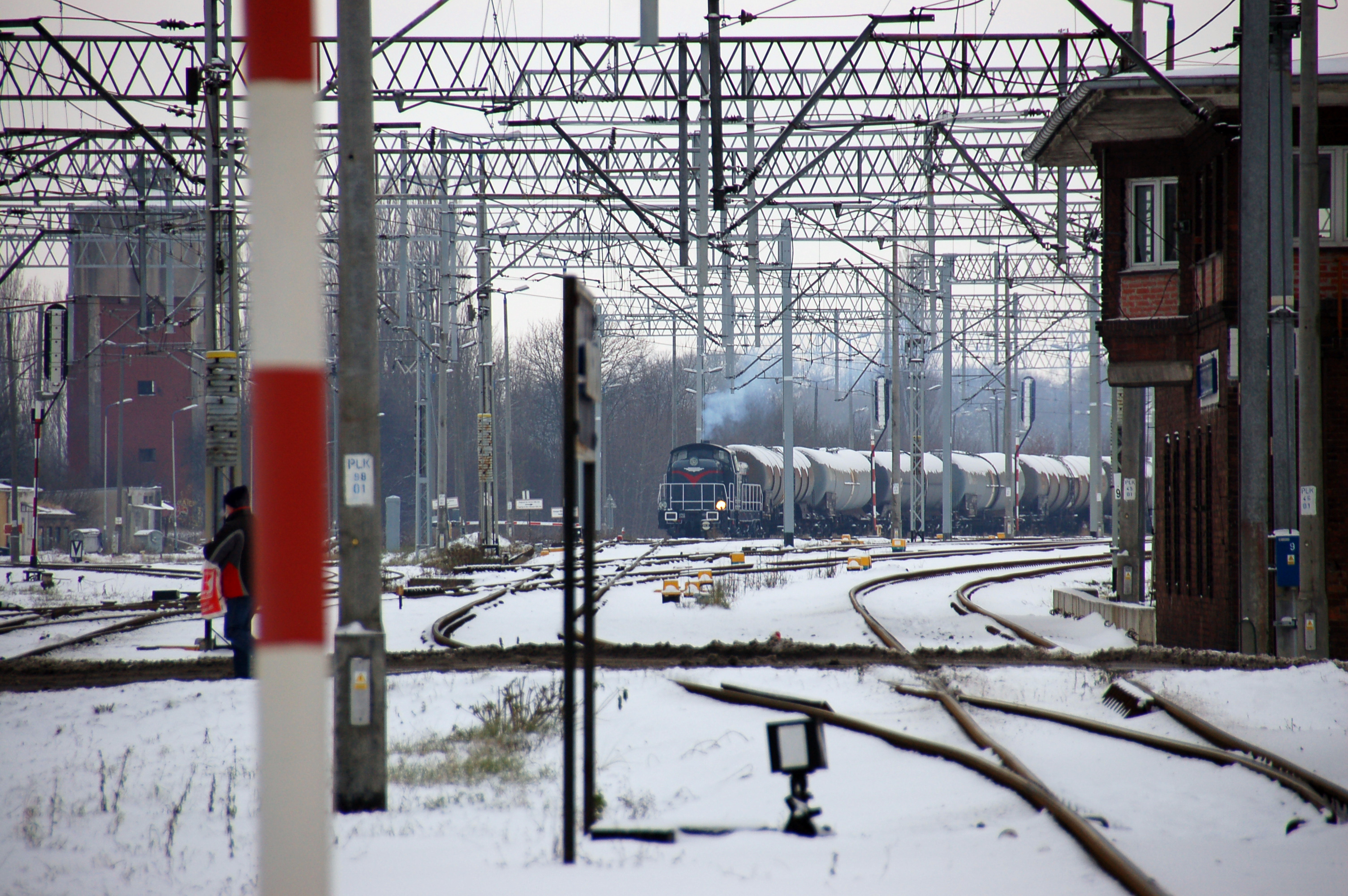

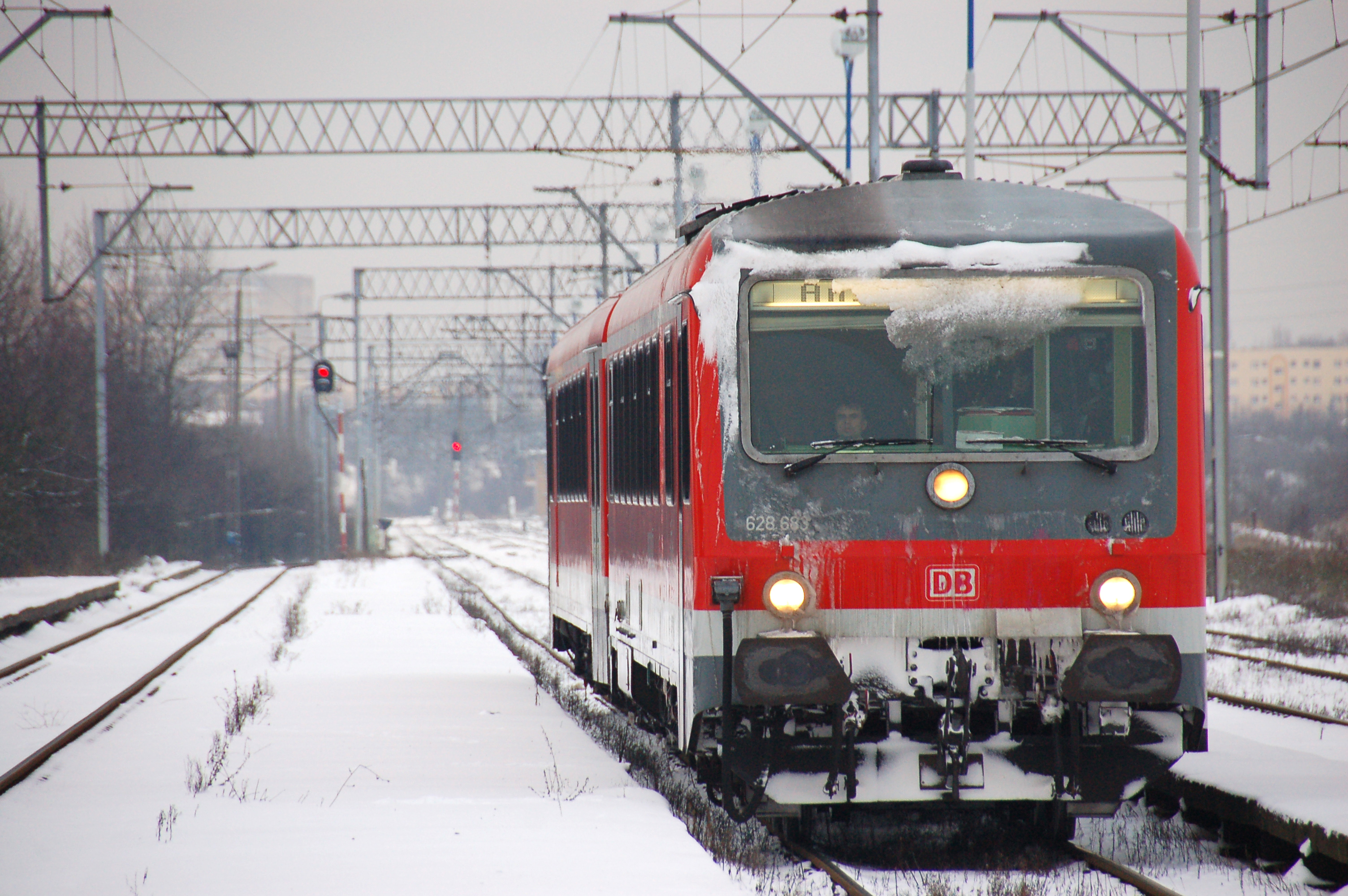
