= Gdańsk Południowy railway station =

Railway station in Gdańsk, Poland

Coordinates: 54.3317°N 18.6371°E

Gdańsk Południowy
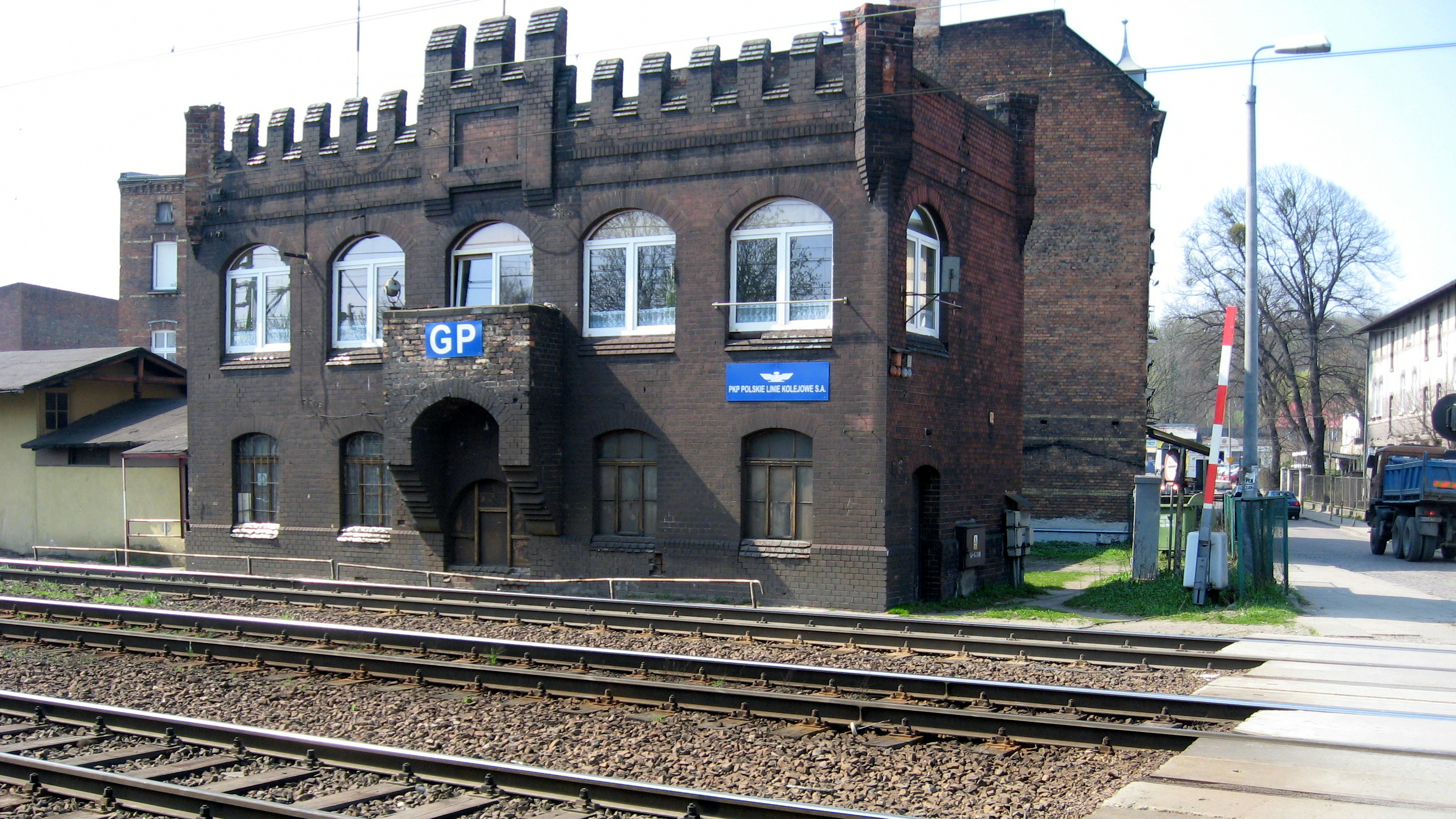

General information
- Location: None, Orunia, Gdańsk; Poland
- Owner: Polskie Koleje Państwowe S.A.
- Platforms: None

Construction
- Structure type: Building: Yes (non operational); Depot: Existed in past Water tower: No

History
- Opened: 1800; 226 years ago
Location

Gdańsk Południowy is a former railway station in Gdańsk, Poland. It was the first station in Gdańsk, built outside the city walls, as the municipal government refused to agree on removing fortifications in order to lead rails inside. After the inauguration of the Gdańsk Główny station, this station became a freight-only one; the station building is no longer used.

== Lines crossing the station ==
Start station	End station	Line type
Warszawa Wschodnia	Gdańsk Główny	Passenger/Freight
Motława Most	Gdańsk Południowy	Freight
