= Maszewo Lęborskie =

- Village
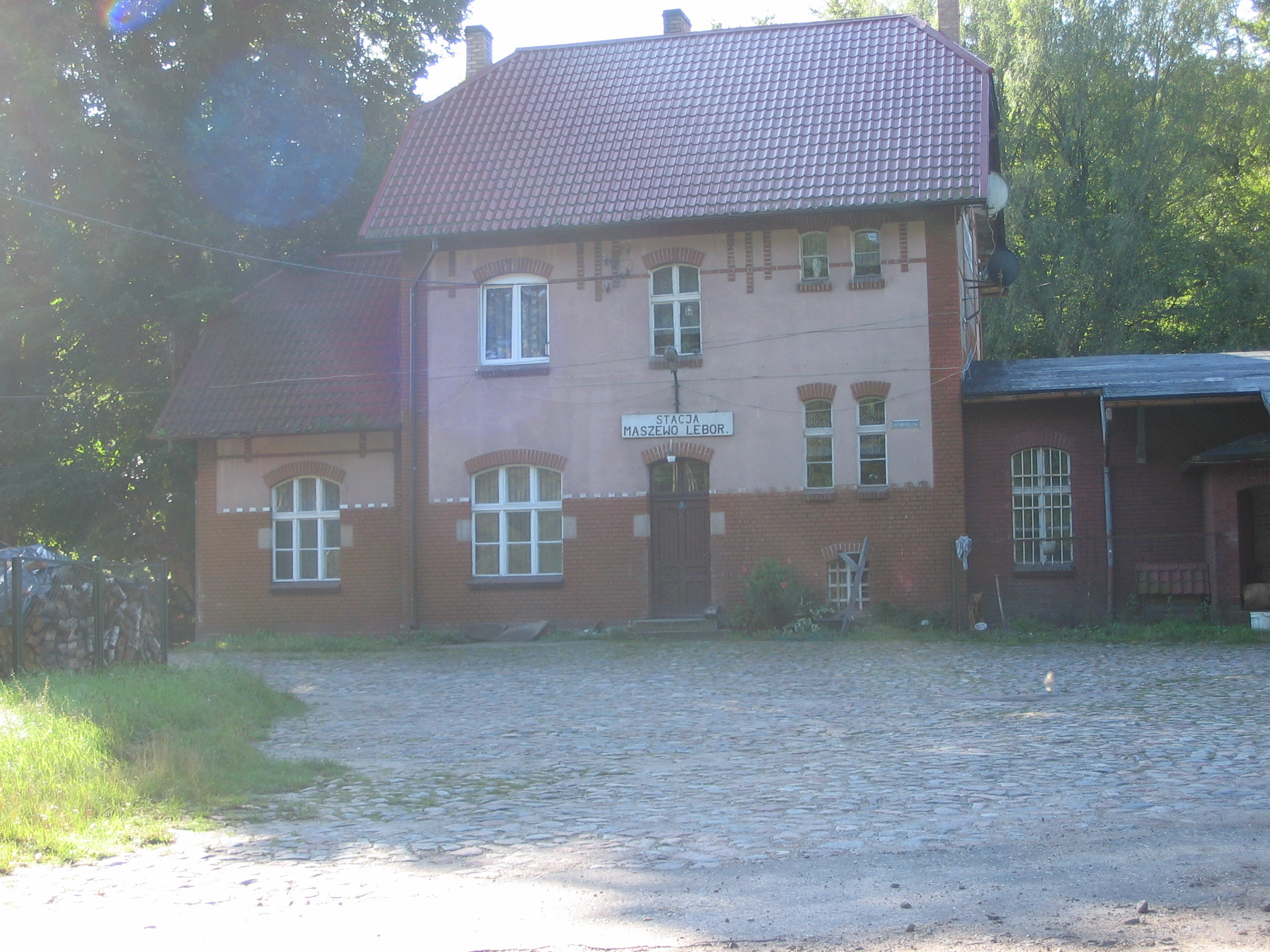
- train station in Maszewo Lęborskie

- Location within Poland
- Coordinates: 54°28′15″N 17°44′6″E
- Country: Poland
- Voivodeship: Pomeranian
- County: Lębork
- Gmina: Cewice
- Population: 764

Maszewo Lęborskie [maˈʂɛvɔ lɛmˈbɔrskʲɛ] (German: Groß Massow) is a village in the administrative district of Gmina Cewice, within Lębork County, Pomeranian Voivodeship, in northern Poland.

For details of the history of the region, see History of Pomerania.
