= Głuchołazy railway station =

Railway station in Poland

Głuchołazy
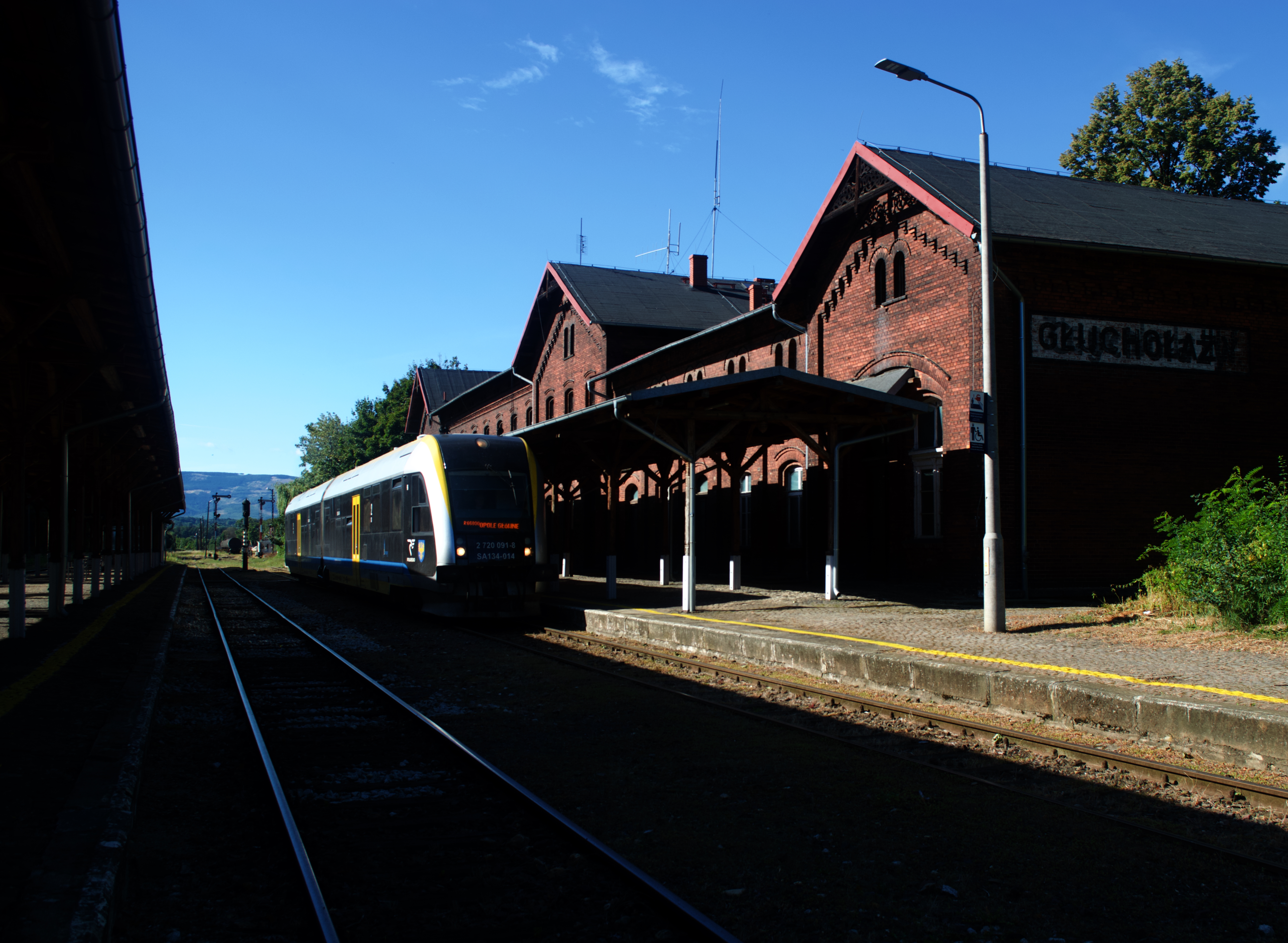
- Railway station in 2025

General information
- Location: Głuchołazy, Opole Voivodeship; Poland
- Owner: Polskie Linie Kolejowe
- Lines: Nowy Świętów–Głuchołazy; Krnov–Głuchołazy; Hanušovice–Głuchołazy
- Platforms: 2
- Tracks: 3
- Train operators: Polregio; České dráhy

Construction
- Architectural style: Rundbogenstil

History
- Opened: 1875
- Former names: Ziegenhals (before 1914); Ziegenhals Hauptbahnhof (1914–1945)
Location
- Location within Poland Location within Opole Voivodeship

Głuchołazy is a railway station in Bodzanów, in the Opole Voivodeship in Poland, it is a transit station for Czech trains on the Krnov – Głuchołazy – Jeseník route.

== Passenger traffic ==
Year	Passenger exchange per day
2017	0-9
2022	0-9

The station primarily handles transit passenger traffic of the Czech Railways. These trains stop at the second platform to change direction. Since 19 December 2006, passengers have been able to board and alight from them. Previously, they were closed to Polish travelers. Currently, apart from the two seasonal pairs of trains from Opole to Jeseník, connections with the Czech Republic are the only ones available in Głuchołazy, and there are no domestic connections.

The Czech transit passenger rail connection through Poland has been in operation since 1948: Krnov – Głuchołazy – Jesenik (via Mikulovice). In the Czech Republic, a direct connection between Krnov and Mikulovice would be over 100 km longer than the transit route through Poland. Currently, Głuchołazy does not have a domestic passenger connection, but it has two connections to Czech towns: Krnov and Jesenik (via Mikulovice).
