= Chorzów Stary =

- Chorzów District
- St. Mary Magdalene church

- Location of Chorzów Stary within Chorzów
- Coordinates: 50°18′23″N 18°58′30″E
- Country: Poland
- Voivodeship: Silesian
- County/City: Chorzów
- Time zone: UTC+1 (CET)
  - Summer (DST): UTC+2 (CEST)
- Area code: (+48) 032

Chorzów Stary (literally Old Chorzów) is a district of Chorzów, Silesian Voivodeship, southern Poland.

== History ==
The village could have been first mentioned in 1136 in a papal bull of Pope Innocent II in the sentence: Item villa ante Bitom, que Zversov dicitur cum rusticis argentifossoribus et cum duabus tabernis nonnisi ad archiepiscopi pertinet iurisdictionem. Later it was mentioned in a document issued by Władysław Opolski on June 24, 1257, which allowed Henryk of Miechów to resettle Chorzów on German law. This privilege was renewed by Casimir of Bytom in 1299. The local Catholic parish was established somewhere between 1300 and 1326, when it was first mentioned in Peter's Pence register among parishes of Sławków deanery in Diocese of Kraków.

After World War I in the Upper Silesia plebiscite 3,242 out of 6,269 voters in Chorzów (Stary) voted in favour of staying in Germany, against 2,980 opting for joining Poland. In 1922 it became a part of Silesian Voivodeship, Second Polish Republic.
