= Galician Transversal Railway =

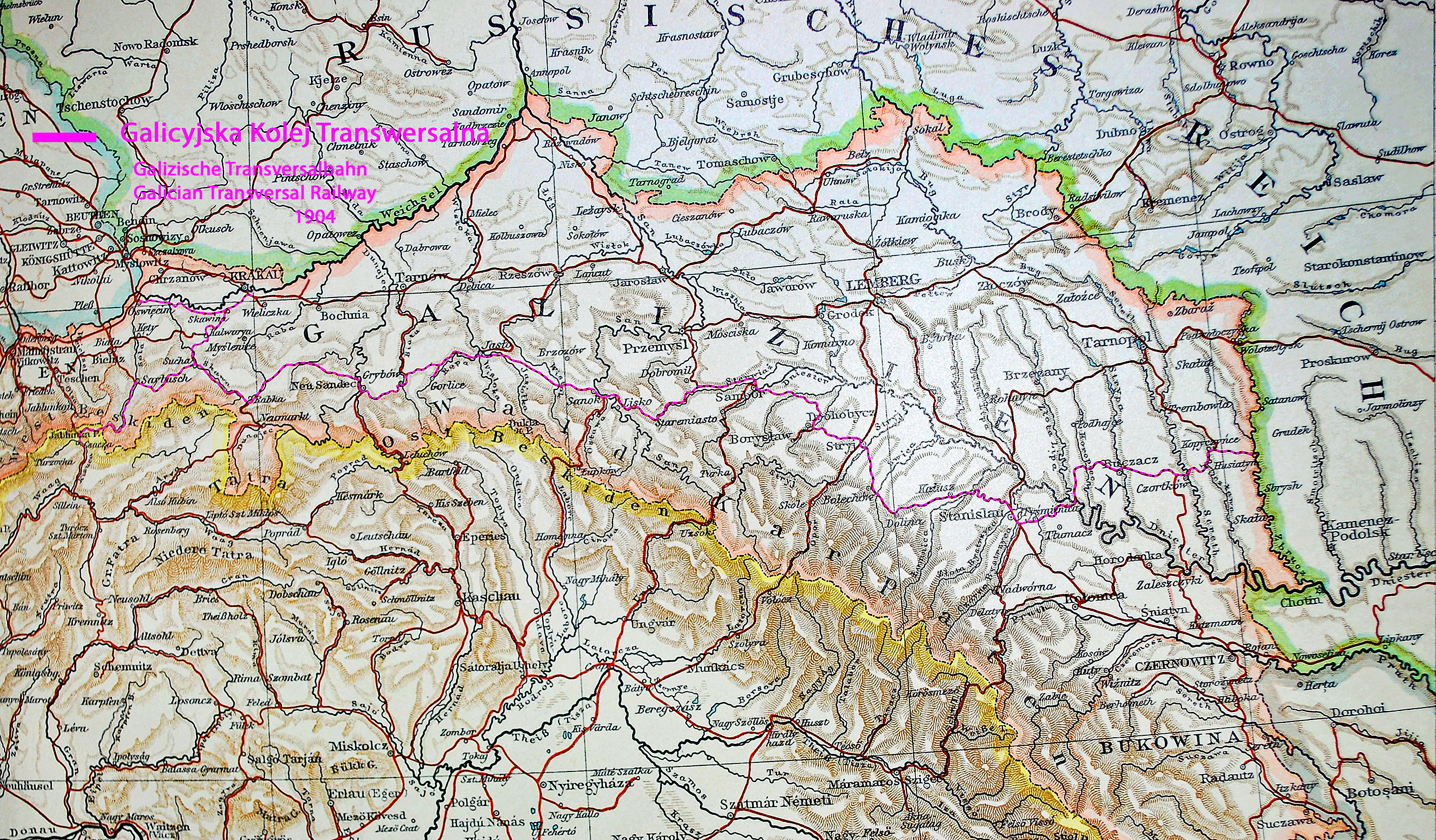
Rail lines of Galicia 1904

The Galician Transversal Railway (German: Galizische Transversalbahn, Polish: Galicyjska Kolej Transwersalna) was a railway system, opened in 1884 in the province of Galicia (Austria-Hungary). It was operated by a state-owned enterprise. The line ran from west to east, along the northern side of the Carpathian Mountains from Zwardoń to Zagórz, passing through the oil fields in the Carpathians.

The line was constructed to connect already existing lines into a continuous east-west route parallel to the main Galician Railway of Archduke Charles Louis route Kraków - Lwów, which would be less exposed to attacks in a war with the Russian Empire. The railway was also supposed to activate underdeveloped mountainous areas of Galicia.

The Transversal Railway started at Čadca (present-day Slovakia), and ended in Husiatyn (present-day Ukraine), with a total length of around 800 km (500 mi). The main towns located along the route are:

- Żywiec,
- Nowy Sącz,
- Jasło,
- Krosno,
- Sanok,
- Zagórz,
- Chyrów,
- Sambor,
- Drohobycz,
- Stryj,
- Stanisławów.

Before construction of the Transversal Railway began, several connections had already existed, such as:

- Zagórz – Krościenko – Chyrów (part of the Łupków – Przemyśl connection of the First Hungarian-Galician Railway, 1872),
- The Dniestr Railway, Chyrów – Sambor – Stryj (1872),
- The Archduke Albrecht Railway, Stryj – Dolina – Stanislawów (1873).
- Nowy Sącz – Stróże (part of the Tarnów – Plaveč connection, 1876)

The lines built within the Transversal Railway project totaled 577 kilometers (359 mi) and these were:

- Čadca – Zwardoń – Żywiec – Sucha Beskidzka – Chabówka – Limanowa – Nowy Sącz (together with side lines Suchá – Skawina – Kraków-Plaszów, and Skawina – Oświęcim),
- Stróze – Jasło – Sanok – Zagórz (together with a branch line to Gorlice),
- Chryplin (near Stanisławów) – Buczacz – Czortków – Husiatyn.

== See also ==
- Imperial Royal Austrian State Railways
- History of rail transport in Poland
- Galician Railway of Archduke Charles Louis
