= Gdańsk Port Północny railway station =

Railway station in Gdańsk, Poland

Gdańsk Port Północny
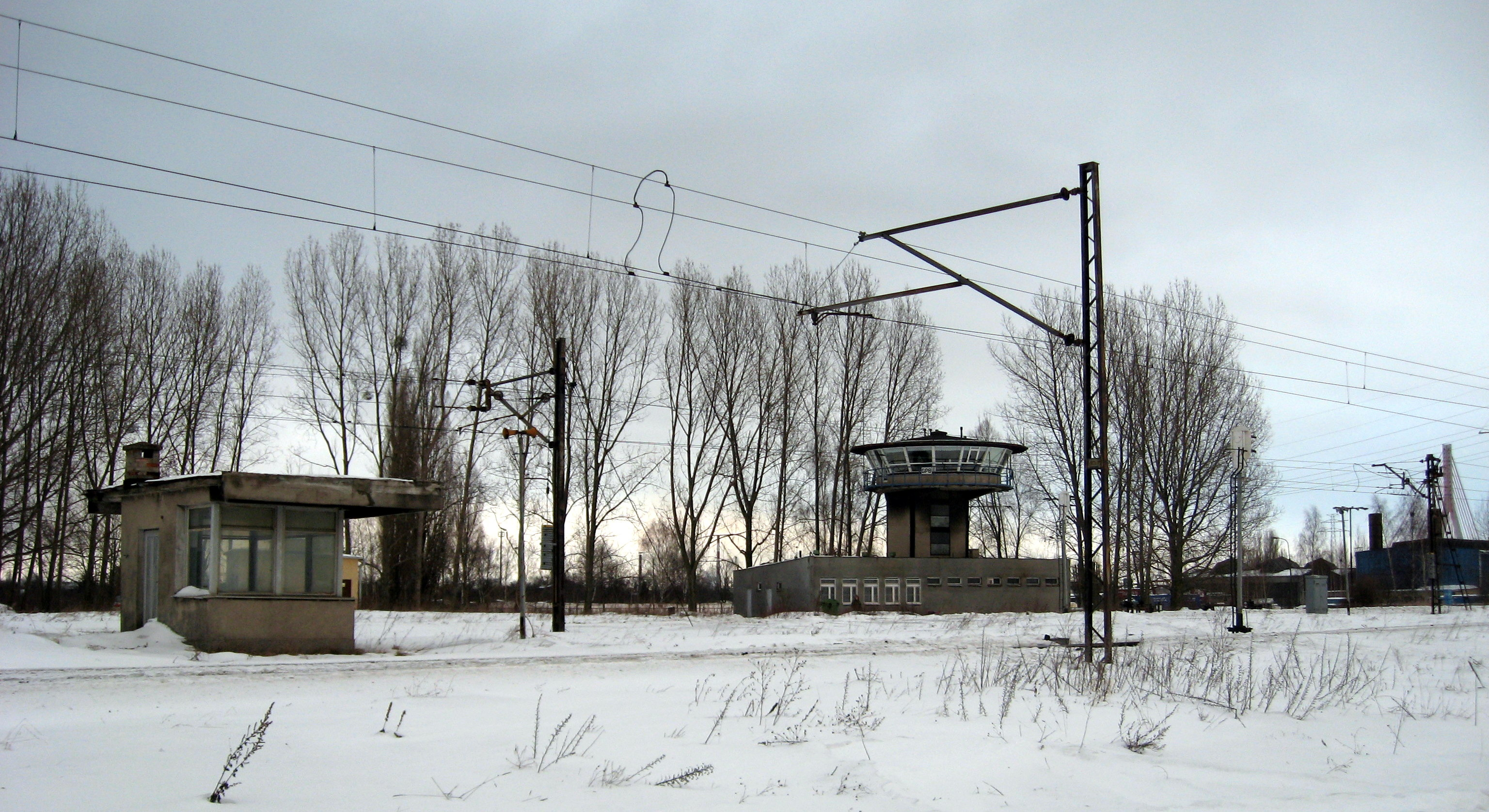

General information
- Location: None, Nowy Port, Gdańsk; Poland
- Coordinates: 54°22′04″N 18°40′59″E
- Owner: Polskie Koleje Państwowe S.A.
- Line: 226
- Platforms: No data

Construction
- Structure type: Building: Yes; Depot: No; Water tower: No
Location

Gdańsk Port Północny is a freight railway station in Gdańsk, a city on the Baltic coast of northern Poland.

== Lines crossing the station ==
Start station	End station	Line type
Pruszcz Gdański	Gdańsk Port Północny	Freight
