= Rokietnica railway station =

Railway station in Greater Poland Voivodeship, Poland

Coordinates: 52.5119°N 16.7536°E

Rokietnica
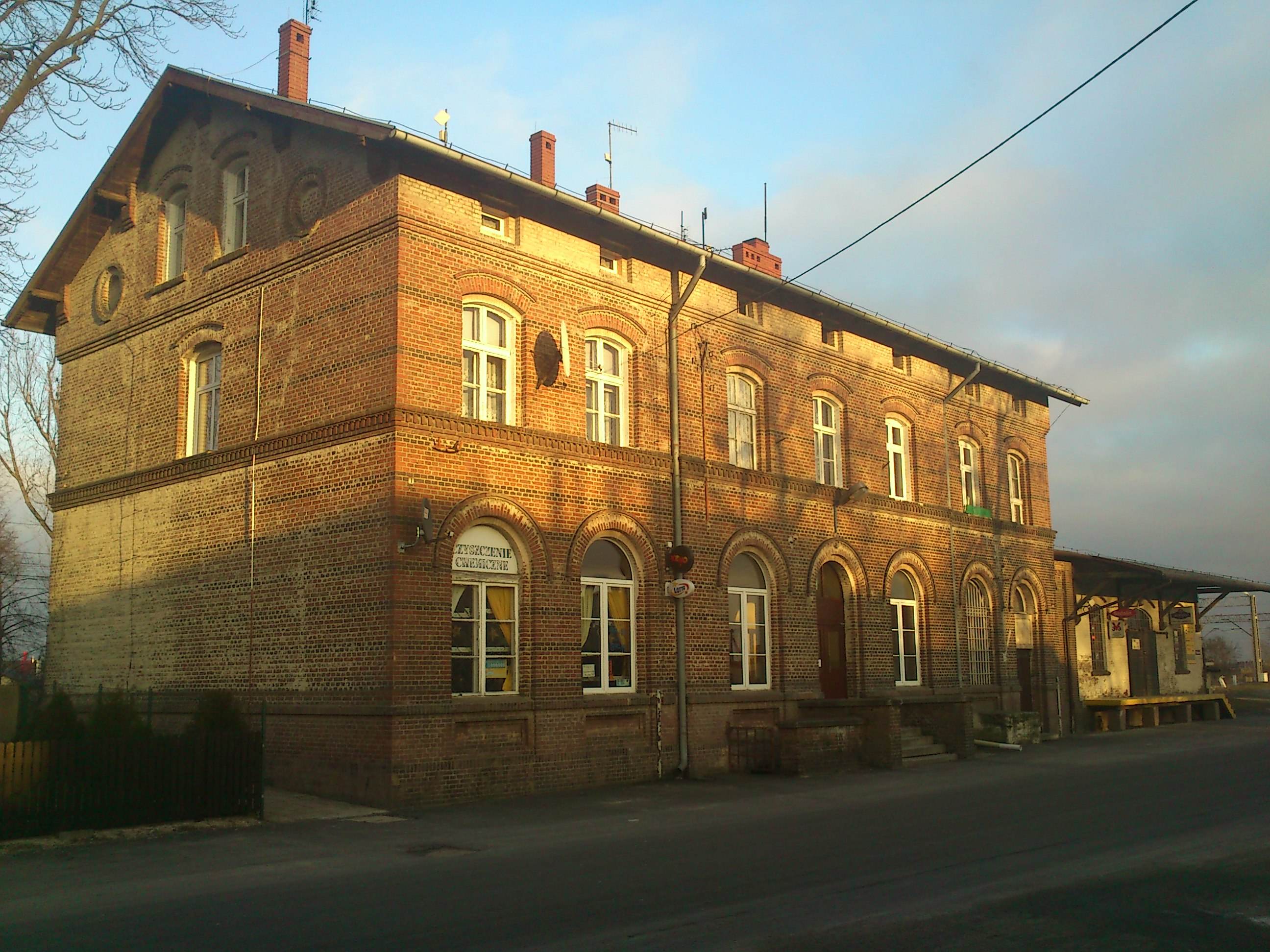
- Rokietnica railway station

General information
- Location: Rokietnica, Greater Poland Voivodeship; Poland
- System: Railway Station
- Operator: Polregio
- Lines: 351: Poznań–Szczecin railway 363: Rokietnica–Skwierzyna railway (closed)
- Platforms: 3
- Tracks: 5

Services
Preceding station	Polregio	Following station
Pamiątkowo towards Szczecin Główny	PR	Kiekrz towards Poznań Główny
Preceding station	KW	Following station
Kiekrz towards Poznań Główny	Poznań - Krzyż	Pamiątkowo towards Krzyż
Preceding station	Poznań Metropolitan Railway	Following station
Pamiątkowo towards Wronki	PKM4	Kiekrz towards Środa Wielkopolska
Location
- Location within Poland

Rokietnica railway station is a railway station serving the village of Rokietnica, in the Greater Poland Voivodeship, Poland. The station is located on the Poznań–Szczecin railway and the now closed Rokietnica–Skwierzyna railway. The train services are operated by Polregio.

== Train services ==
The station is served by the following service(s):

- Regional services (R) Szczecin - Stargard - Dobiegniew - Krzyz - Wronki - Poznan
