= Baborówko railway station =

Railway station in Poland

Coordinates: 52.583°N 16.627°E

Baborówko

General information
- Location: Baborówko, Greater Poland Voivodeship; Poland
- System: Railway Station
- Operator: Polregio
- Line: 351: Poznań–Szczecin railway
- Platforms: 2
- Tracks: 2

Services
Preceding station	Polregio	Following station
Szamotuły towards Szczecin Główny	PR	Pamiątkowo towards Poznań Główny
Preceding station	KW	Following station
Pamiątkowo towards Poznań Główny	Poznań - Krzyż	Szamotuły towards Krzyż
Preceding station	Poznań Metropolitan Railway	Following station
Szamotuły towards Wronki	PKM4	Pamiątkowo towards Środa Wielkopolska
Location
- Location within Poland

Baborówko railway station is a railway station serving the village of Baborówko, in the Greater Poland Voivodeship, Poland. The station is located on the Poznań–Szczecin railway. The train services are operated by Polregio.

== Train services ==
The station is served by the following service(s):

- Regional services (R) Szczecin - Stargard - Dobiegniew - Krzyz - Wronki - Poznan
