= Pamiątkowo railway station =

Railway station in Pamiątkowo, Poland

Coordinates: 52.5537°N 16.6850°E

Pamiątkowo
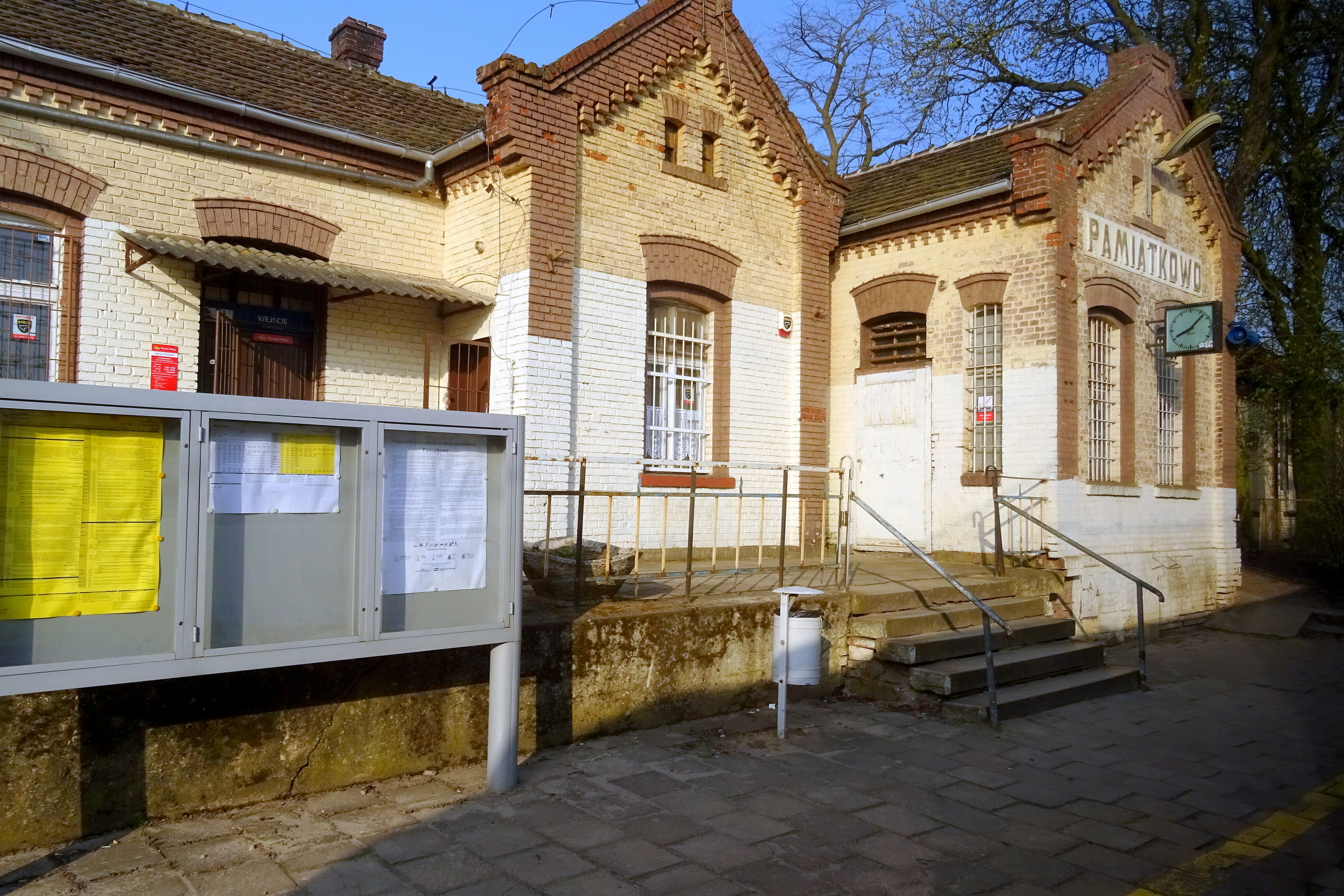
- Pamiątkowo railway station

General information
- Location: Pamiątkowo, Greater Poland Voivodeship; Poland
- System: Railway Station
- Operator: Polregio
- Line: 351: Poznań–Szczecin railway
- Platforms: 2
- Tracks: 4

Services
Preceding station	Polregio	Following station
Baborówko towards Szczecin Główny	PR	Rokietnica towards Poznań Główny
Preceding station	KW	Following station
Rokietnica towards Poznań Główny	Poznań - Krzyż	Baborówko towards Krzyż
Preceding station	Poznań Metropolitan Railway	Following station
Baborówko towards Wronki	PKM4	Rokietnica towards Środa Wielkopolska
Location
- Location within Poland

Pamiątkowo railway station is a railway station serving the village of Pamiątkowo, in the Greater Poland Voivodeship, Poland. The station is located on the Poznań–Szczecin railway. The train services are operated by Polregio.

== Train services ==
The station is served by the following service(s):

- Regional services (R) Szczecin - Stargard - Dobiegniew - Krzyz - Wronki - Poznan
