= Szamotuły railway station =

Railway station in Szamotuły, Poland

Coordinates: 52.6036°N 16.5858°E

Szamotuły
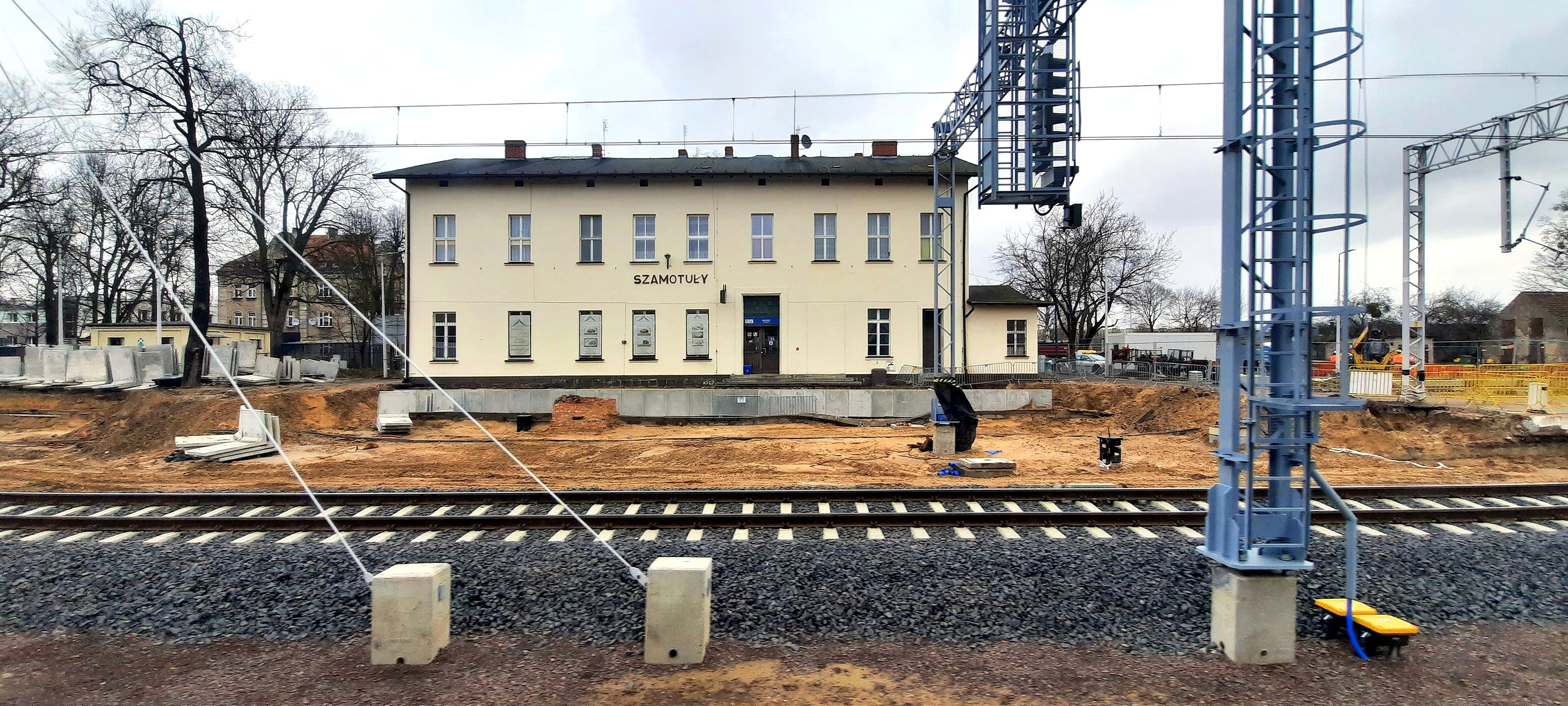
- Szamotuły railway station

General information
- Location: Szamotuły, Greater Poland Voivodeship; Poland
- System: Railway Station
- Operator: PKP; Polregio
- Lines: 351: Poznań–Szczecin railway 368: Szamotuły–Międzychód railway
- Platforms: 3
- Tracks: 4

History
- Opened: 1848; 178 years ago
- Former names: Samter

Services
Preceding station	Polregio	Following station
Pęckowo towards Szczecin Główny	PR	Baborówko towards Poznań Główny
Preceding station	KW	Following station
Baborówko towards Poznań Główny	Poznań - Krzyż	Pęckowo towards Krzyż
Preceding station	Poznań Metropolitan Railway	Following station
Pęckowo towards Wronki	PKM4	Baborówko towards Środa Wielkopolska
Location
- Location within Poland

Szamotuły railway station is a railway station serving the town of Szamotuły, in the Greater Poland Voivodeship, Poland. The station opened in 1848 and is located on the Poznań–Szczecin railway and Szamotuły–Międzychód railway. The train services are operated by PKP and Polregio.

== Train services ==
The station is served by the following services:

- Intercity services Swinoujscie - Szczecin - Stargard - Krzyz - Poznan - Kutno - Warsaw - Bialystok / Lublin - Rzeszow - Przemysl
- Intercity services Swinoujscie - Szczecin - Stargard - Krzyz - Poznan - Leszno - Wroclaw - Opole - Katowice - Krakow - Rzeszow - Przemysl
- Intercity services Szczecin - Stargard - Krzyz - Poznan - Kutno - Lowicz - Lodz - Krakow
- Intercity services Gorzow Wielkopolskie - Krzyz - Poznan - Ostrow Wielkopolski - Lubliniec - Czestochowa - Krakow
- Regional services (R) Szczecin - Stargard - Dobiegniew - Krzyz - Wronki - Poznan
