= Poznań Wola railway station =

Railway station in Poznań, Poland

Coordinates: 52.4334°N 16.8503°E

Poznań Wola
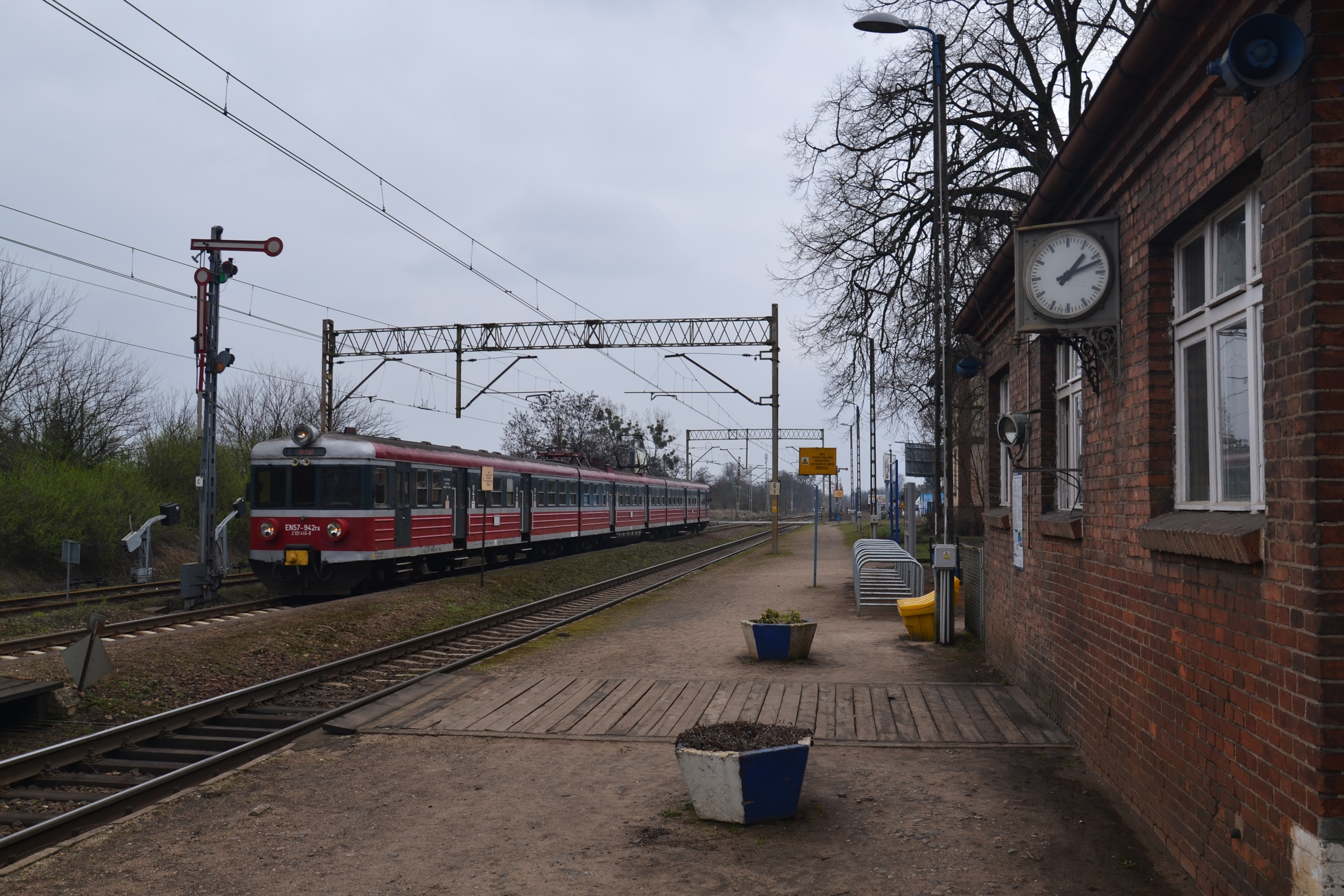
- Poznań Wola railway station

General information
- Location: Poznań, Greater Poland Voivodeship; Poland
- System: Railway Station
- Operator: Polregio
- Line: 351: Poznań–Szczecin railway
- Platforms: 2
- Tracks: 3

History
- Opened: 1902; 124 years ago

Services
Preceding station	Polregio	Following station
Kiekrz towards Szczecin Główny	PR	Poznań Główny Terminus
Preceding station	KW	Following station
Poznań Główny Terminus	Poznań - Krzyż	Kiekrz towards Krzyż
Preceding station	Poznań Metropolitan Railway	Following station
Kiekrz towards Wronki	PKM4	Poznań Główny railway station towards Środa Wielkopolska
Location
- Location within Poland Location within Greater Poland Voivodeship

Poznań Wola railway station is a railway station serving the city of Poznań, in the Greater Poland Voivodeship, Poland. The station opened in 1902 and is located on the Poznań–Szczecin railway. The train services are operated by Polregio.

== Train services ==
The station is served by the following service(s):

- Regional services (R) Swinoujscie - Szczecin - Stargard - Dobiegniew - Krzyz - Wronki - Poznan
- Regional services (R) Kostrzyn - Gorzow Wielkopolski - Krzyz - Wronki - Poznan
