= Miały railway station =

Railway station in Miały, Poland

Coordinates: 52.8093°N 16.1757°E

Miały
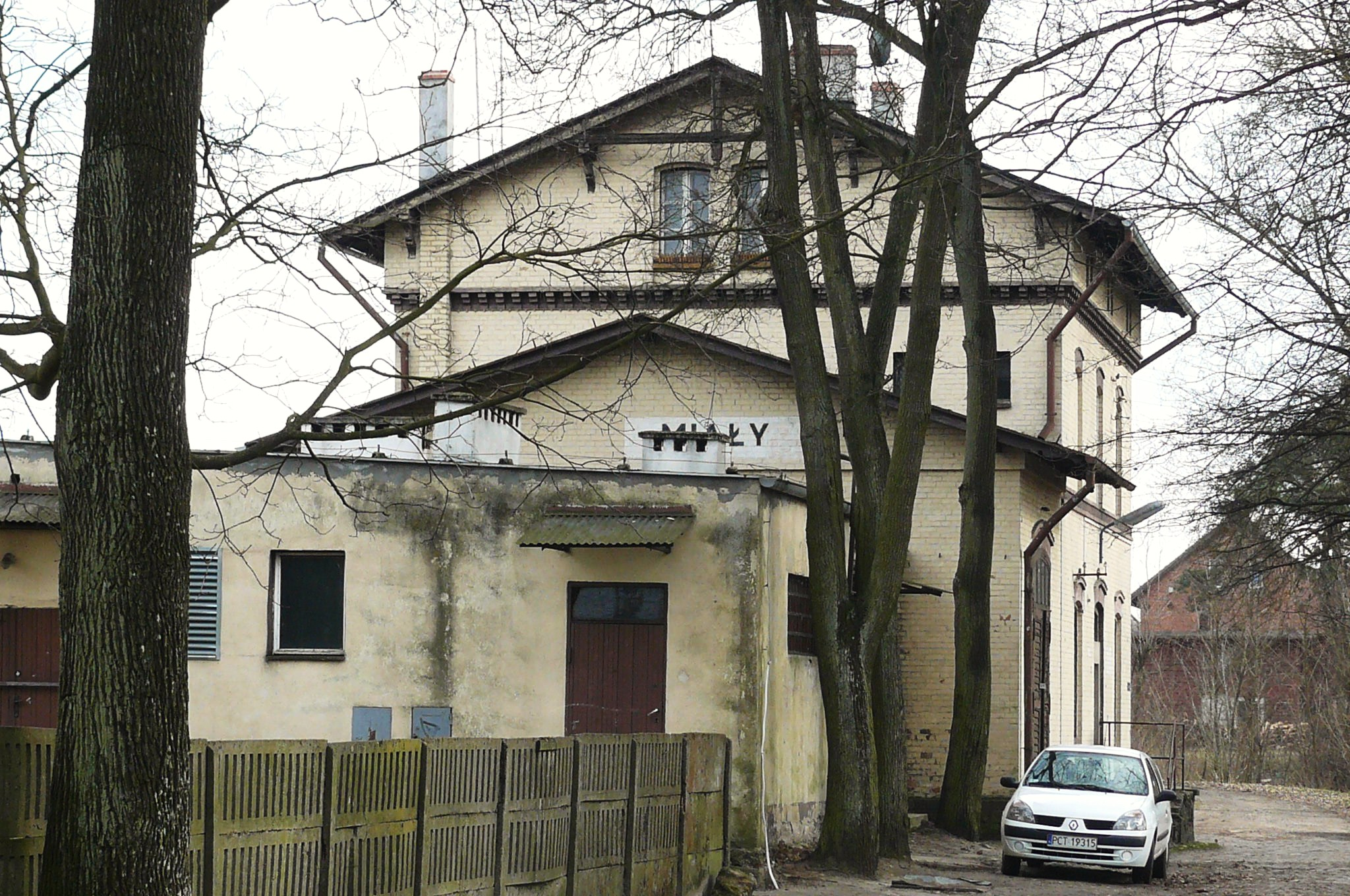
- Miały railway station

General information
- Location: Miały, Greater Poland Voivodeship; Poland
- System: Railway Station
- Operator: Polregio
- Line: 351: Poznań–Szczecin railway
- Platforms: 2
- Tracks: 2

Services
Preceding station	Polregio	Following station
Drawski Młyn towards Szczecin Główny	PR	Mokrz towards Poznań Główny
Preceding station	KW	Following station
Mokrz towards Poznań Główny	Poznań - Krzyż	Drawski Młyn towards Krzyż
Location
- Location within Poland

Miały railway station is a railway station serving the village of Miały, in the Greater Poland Voivodeship, Poland. The station is located on the Poznań–Szczecin railway. The train services are operated by Polregio.

== Train services ==
The station is served by the following services:

- Regional services (R) Szczecin - Stargard - Dobiegniew - Krzyz - Wronki - Poznan
