= Kiekrz railway station =

Railway station in Poznań, Poland

Coordinates: 52.4756°N 16.7898°E

Kiekrz
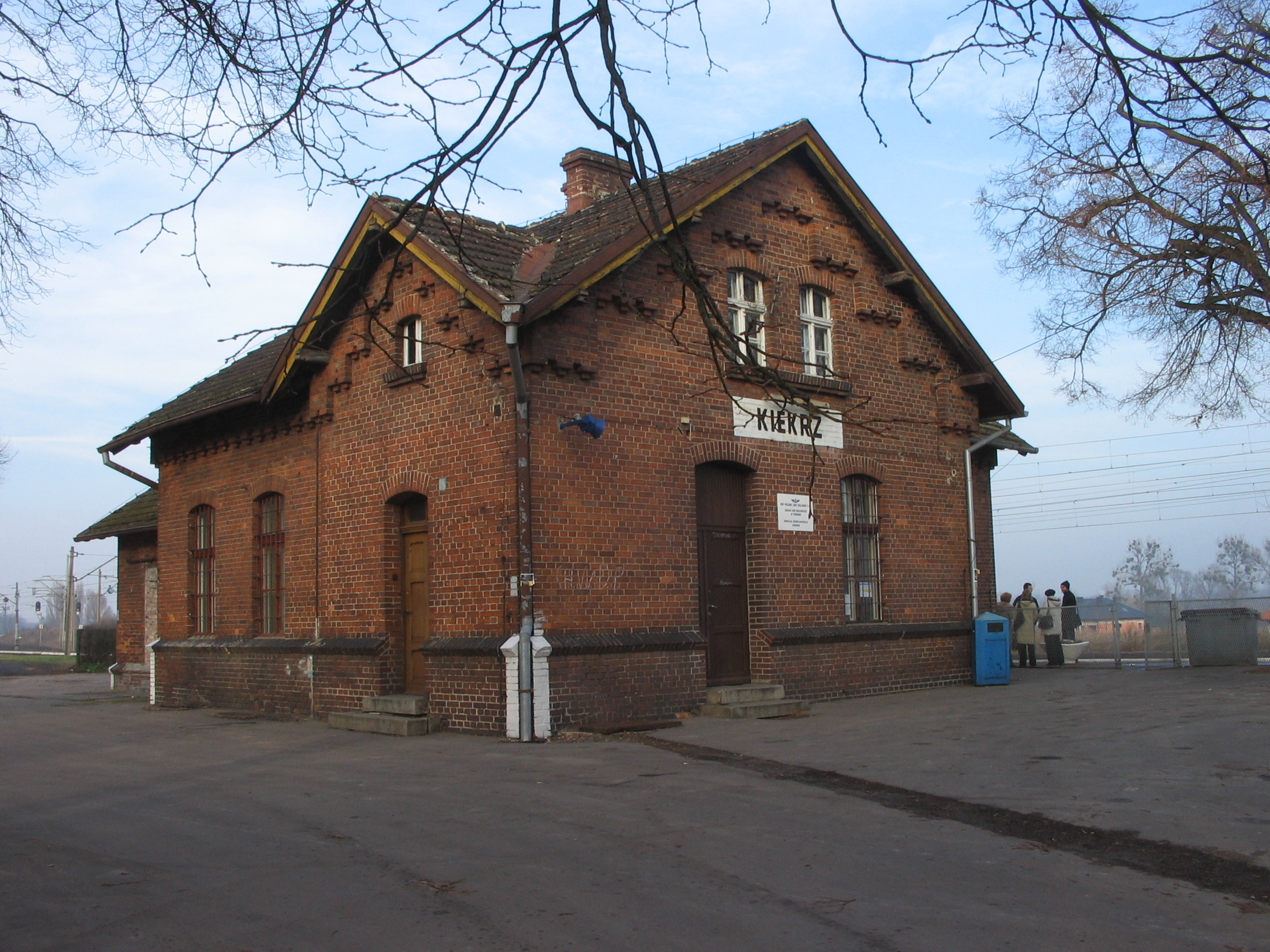
- Kiekrz railway station

General information
- Location: Kiekrz, Greater Poland Voivodeship; Poland
- System: Railway Station
- Operator: Polregio
- Lines: 351: Poznań–Szczecin railway 395: Zieliniec–Kiekrz railway
- Platforms: 2
- Tracks: 4

Services
Preceding station	Polregio	Following station
Rokietnica towards Szczecin Główny	PR	Poznań Wola towards Poznań Główny
Preceding station	KW	Following station
Poznań Wola towards Poznań Główny	Poznań - Krzyż	Rokietnica towards Krzyż
Preceding station	Poznań Metropolitan Railway	Following station
Rokietnica towards Wronki	PKM4	Poznań Wola towards Środa Wielkopolska
Location
- Location within Poland

Kiekrz railway station is a railway station serving the village of Kiekrz, in the Greater Poland Voivodeship, Poland. The station is located on the Poznań–Szczecin railway and Zieliniec–Kiekrz railway. The train services are operated by Polregio.

== Train services ==
The station is served by the following service(s):

- Regional services (R) Szczecin - Stargard - Dobiegniew - Krzyz - Wronki - Poznan
