= Mokrz railway station =

Railway station in Mokrz, Poland

Coordinates: 52.7411°N 16.2783°E

Mokrz
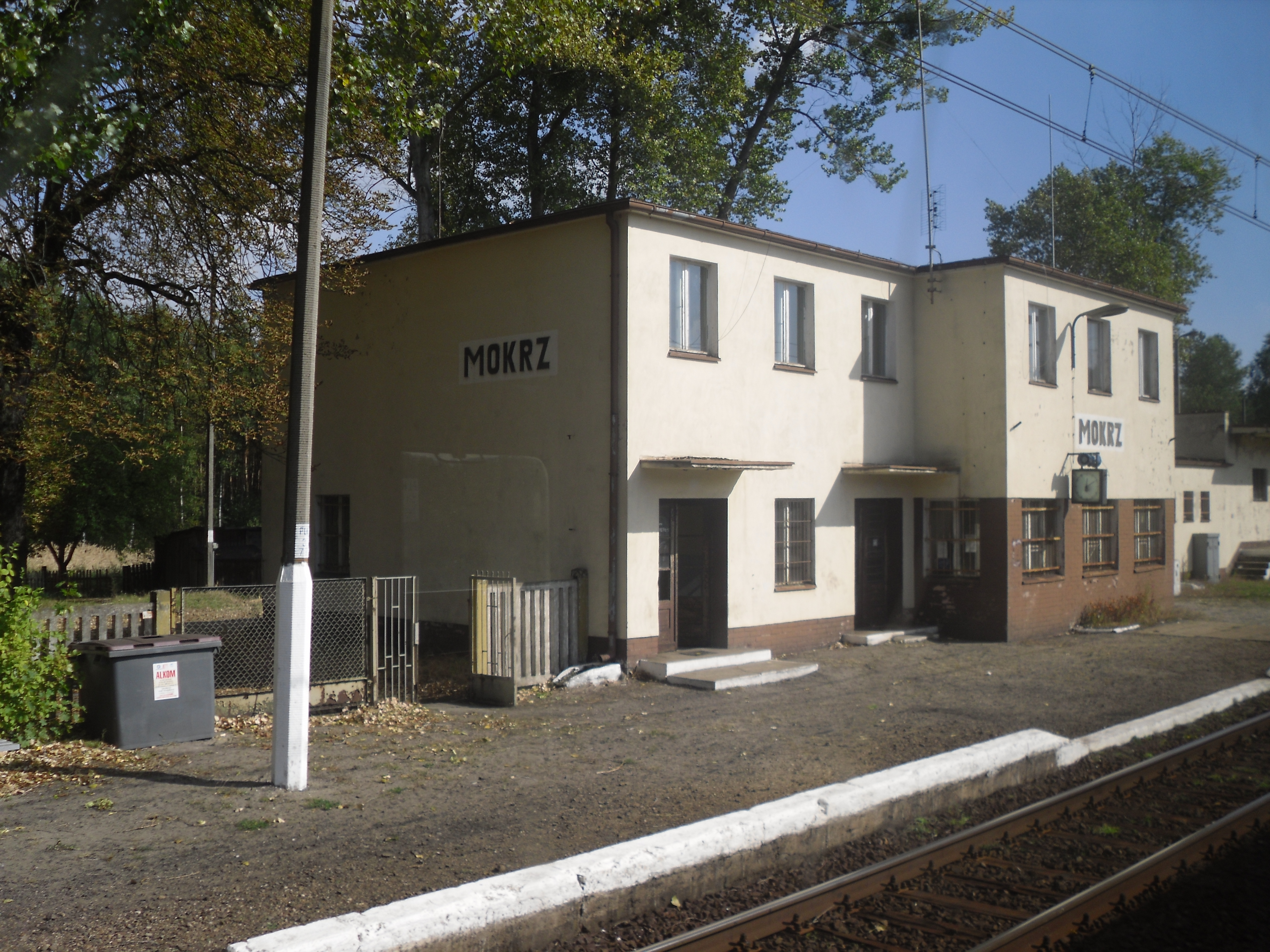
- Mokrz railway station

General information
- Location: Mokrz, Greater Poland Voivodeship; Poland
- System: Railway Station
- Operator: Polregio
- Line: 351: Poznań–Szczecin railway
- Platforms: 2
- Tracks: 2

Services
Preceding station	Polregio	Following station
Miały towards Szczecin Główny	PR	Wronki towards Poznań Główny
Preceding station	KW	Following station
Wronki towards Poznań Główny	Poznań - Krzyż	Miały towards Krzyż
Location
- Location within Poland

Mokrz railway station is a railway station serving the village of Mokrz, in the Greater Poland Voivodeship, Poland. The station is located on the Poznań–Szczecin railway. The train services are operated by Polregio.

== Train services ==
The station is served by the following services:

- Regional services (R) Szczecin - Stargard - Dobiegniew - Krzyz - Wronki - Poznan
