= Drawski Młyn railway station =

Railway station in Drawski Młyn, Poland

Coordinates: 52.8601°N 16.0937°E

Drawski Młyn
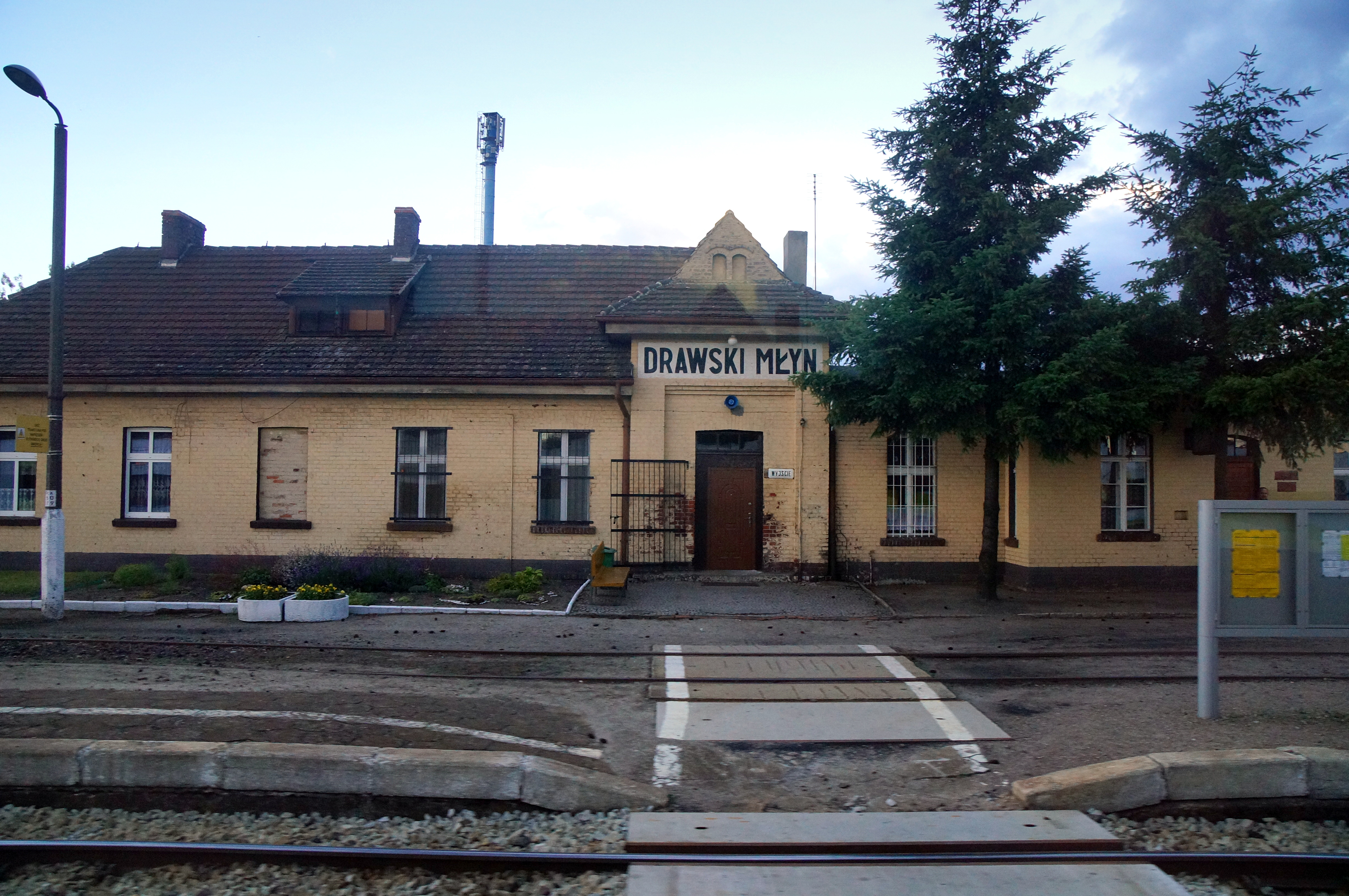
- Drawski Młyn railway station in 2016

General information
- Location: Drawski Młyn, Greater Poland Voivodeship; Poland
- System: Railway Station
- Operator: Polregio
- Lines: 206: Inowrocław–Drawski Młyn railway (closed); 351: Poznań–Szczecin railway
- Platforms: 2
- Tracks: 2

Services
Preceding station	Polregio	Following station
Krzyż towards Szczecin Główny	PR	Miały towards Poznań Główny
Preceding station	KW	Following station
Miały towards Poznań Główny	Poznań - Krzyż	Krzyż Terminus
Location
- Location within Poland

Drawski Młyn railway station is a railway station serving the village of Drawski Młyn, in the Greater Poland Voivodeship, Poland. The station is located on the Poznań–Szczecin railway and the now closed Inowrocław–Drawski Młyn railway. The train services are operated by Polregio.

== Train services ==
The station is served by the following services:

- Regional services (R) Szczecin - Stargard - Dobiegniew - Krzyz - Wronki - Poznan
