= Pęckowo railway station =

Railway station in Poland

Coordinates: 52.6639°N 16.4898°E

Pęckowo
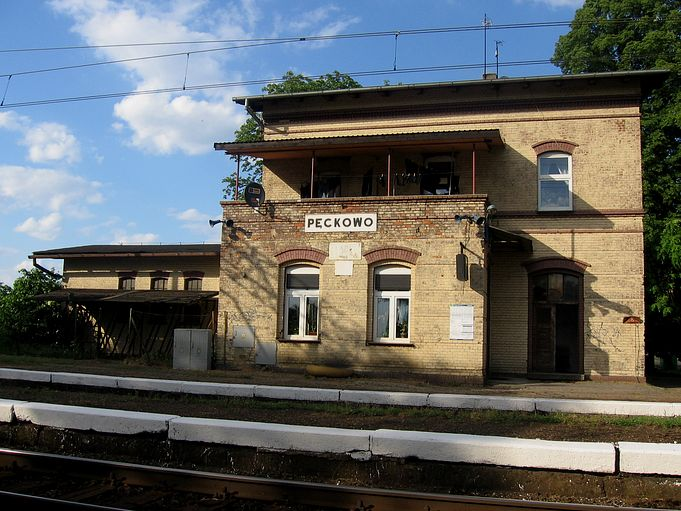
- Pęckowo railway station

General information
- Location: Pęckowo, Greater Poland Voivodeship; Poland
- System: Railway Station
- Operator: Polregio
- Line: 351: Poznań–Szczecin railway
- Platforms: 2
- Tracks: 2

Services
Preceding station	Polregio	Following station
Szamotuły towards Szczecin Główny	PR	Wronki towards Poznań Główny
Preceding station	KW	Following station
Wronki towards Poznań Główny	Poznań - Krzyż	Szamotuły towards Krzyż
Preceding station	Poznań Metropolitan Railway	Following station
Wronki Terminus	PKM4	Szamotuły towards Środa Wielkopolska
Location
- Location within Poland

Pęckowo railway station is a railway station serving the village of Pęckowo, in the Greater Poland Voivodeship, Poland. The station is located on the Poznań–Szczecin railway. The train services are operated by PKP and Polregio.

== Train services ==
The station is served by the following services:

- Regional services (R) Szczecin - Stargard - Dobiegniew - Krzyz - Wronki - Poznan
