= Gądki railway station =

Railway station in Gądki, Poland

Coordinates: 52.3020°N 17.0451°E

Gądki
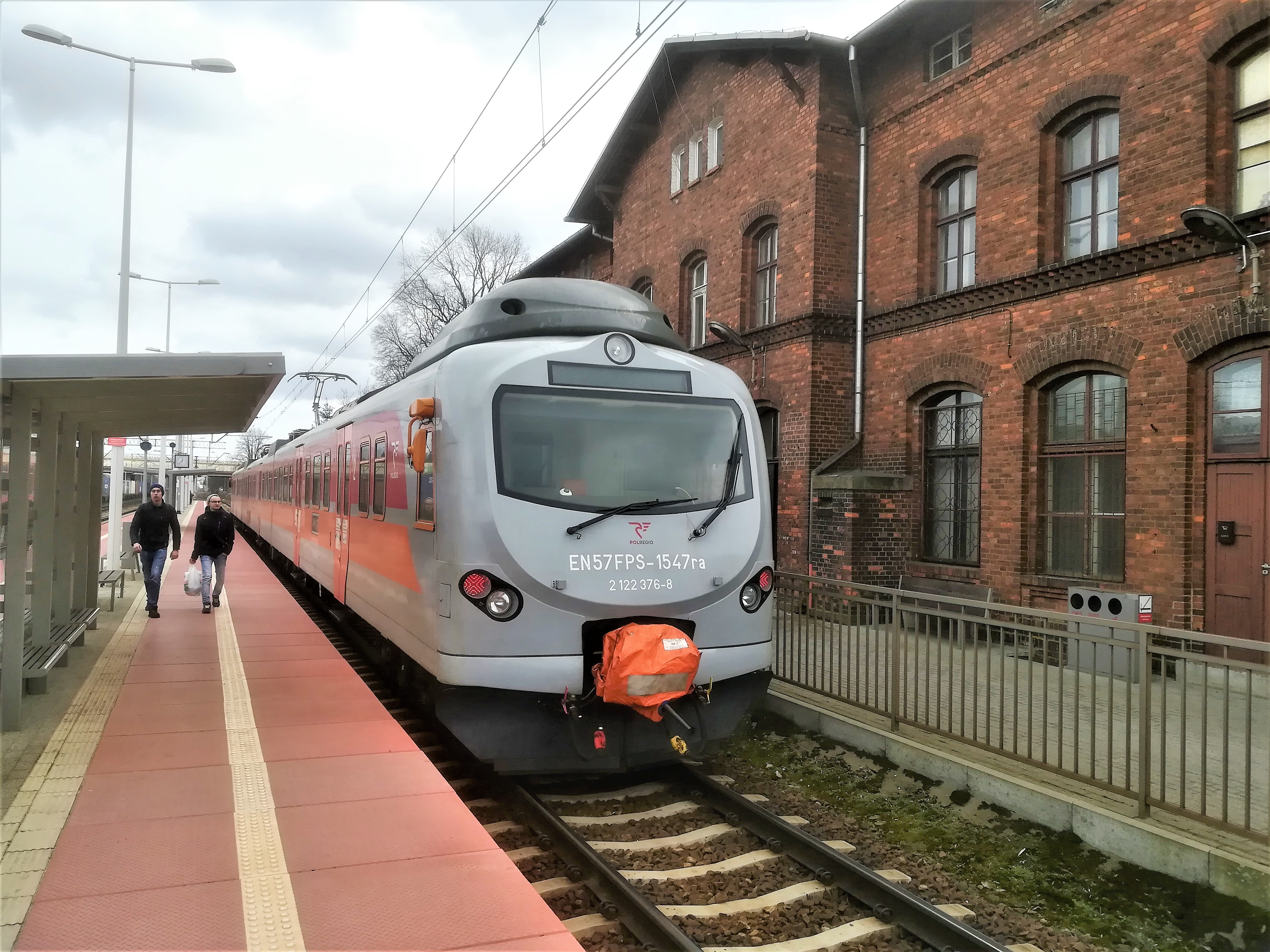
- Gądki railway station

General information
- Location: Gądki, Greater Poland Voivodeship; Poland
- System: Railway Station
- Operator: Polregio
- Line: 272: Kluczbork–Poznań railway
- Platforms: 2
- Tracks: 4

Services
Preceding station	Polregio	Following station
Poznań Krzesiny towards Poznań Główny	IR	Kórnik towards Warszawa Główna
Poznań Krzesiny towards Poznań Główny	PR	Kórnik towards Łódź Kaliska
Preceding station	KW	Following station
Poznań Krzesiny towards Poznań Główny	Poznań - Milicz	Kórnik towards Milicz
Poznań Krzesiny towards Poznań Główny	Poznań - Odolanów	Kórnik towards Odolanów
Poznań Krzesiny towards Poznań Główny	Poznań - Kępno	Kórnik towards Kępno
Poznań Krzesiny towards Poznań Główny	Poznań - Kalisz	Kórnik towards Kalisz
Preceding station	Poznań Metropolitan Railway	Following station
Poznań Krzesiny towards Wronki	PKM4	Kórnik towards Środa Wielkopolska
Location
- Location within Poland

Gądki railway station is a railway station in Gądki, Greater Poland Voivodeship, Poland. The station is located on the Kluczbork–Poznań railway. The train services are operated by Polregio.

To the west of the station is an intermodal container terminal.

== Train services ==
The station is served by the following service(s):

- InterRegio services (IR) Poznań Główny — Ostrów Wielkopolski — Łódź — Warszawa Główna
- Regional services (PR) Łódź Kaliska — Ostrów Wielkopolski — Poznań Główny
