= Equestrian events at the 2024 Summer Olympics – Qualification =

The 200 quota places for equestrian at the 2024 Summer Olympics were divided across the three disciplines (75 for jumping, 65 for eventing, and 60 for dressage). Teams in each discipline consisted of three horse and rider pairs; any National Olympic Committee (NOC) that qualified a team (20 teams for jumping, 16 for eventing, and 15 for dressage) also received three entries in the individual competition for that discipline. NOCs that did not qualify teams could earn one individual place in dressage and jumping and up to two individual places in eventing, for a total of 15 entries in jumping and dressage and 17 for eventing. Teams qualified primarily through specific competitions (World Equestrian Games and continental tournaments), while individuals qualified through rankings. The host nation, France, automatically qualified a team in each discipline.

== Timeline ==
The following is a timeline of the qualification events for the equestrian events at the 2024 Summer Olympics.

Event	Date	Venue
2022 FEI World Championships	August 6–14, 2022	(Denmark) Herning
2022 Eventing World Championships	September 15–18, 2022	(Italy) Pratoni del Vivaro
2022 Jumping Nations Cup Final	September 29 – October 2, 2022	(Spain) Barcelona
2023 Group F jumping qualification event	February 27–28, 2023	(Qatar) Doha
2023 Eventing Nations Cup	March 9 – October 8, 2023	Various
2023 Group C eventing qualification event	May 18–21, 2023	(Poland) Baborowko
2023 Groups F/G eventing qualification event	June 1–4, 2023	(Republic of Ireland) Millstreet
2023 Group C dressage qualification event	June 7–11, 2023	(Hungary) Pilisjászfalu
2023 Group G jumping qualification event	July 18, 2023	(Netherlands) Valkenswaard
2023 Group C jumping qualification event	July 27–30, 2023	(Czech Republic) Prague
2023 European Eventing Championships	August 9–13, 2023	(France) Le Pin-au-Haras
2023 European Jumping Championships	August 29 – September 3, 2023	(Italy) Milan
2023 FEI European Dressage Championships	September 4–10, 2023	(Germany) Riesenbeck
2023 Jumping Nations Cup Final	September 28 – October 1, 2023	(Spain) Barcelona
2023 Pan American Games	October 22 – November 5, 2023	(Chile) Santiago
Group F dressage qualification event	Reallocation of unused quota	—
End of FEI ranking period	December 31, 2023	—

== Qualification summary ==
Nation	Individual			Team			Total
Nation	Dressage	Eventing	Jumping	Dressage	Eventing	Jumping	Total
Argentina			1				1
Australia	3	3	3	Yes	Yes	Yes	9
Austria	3	2	3	Yes		Yes	8
Belgium	3	3	3	Yes	Yes	Yes	9
Brazil	1	3	3		Yes	Yes	7
Canada	3	3	3	Yes	Yes	Yes	9
Chile			1				1
China		2					2
Colombia			1				1
Czech Republic		2					2
Denmark	3	1	1	Yes			5
Dominican Republic	1						1
Ecuador	1	2					3
Egypt			1				1
Estonia			1				1
Finland	3	2		Yes			5
France	3	3	3	Yes	Yes	Yes	9
Germany	3	3	3	Yes	Yes	Yes	9
Great Britain	3	3	3	Yes	Yes	Yes	9
Greece			1				1
Hungary		1					1
India	1						1
Ireland	1	3	3		Yes	Yes	7
Israel			3			Yes	3
Italy		3	1		Yes		4
Japan		3	3		Yes	Yes	6
South Korea	1						1
Latvia			1				1
Lithuania	1		1				2
Luxembourg	1						1
Moldova	1						1
Mexico			3			Yes	3
Morocco	1	1					2
Netherlands	3	3	3	Yes	Yes	Yes	9
New Zealand	1	3			Yes		4
Norway	1		1				2
Poland	3	3	3	Yes	Yes	Yes	9
Portugal	3	1	1	Yes			5
Saudi Arabia			3			Yes	3
Singapore	1						1
South Africa		1					1
Spain	3	2	3	Yes		Yes	8
Sweden	3	3	3	Yes	Yes	Yes	9
Switzerland	1	3	3		Yes	Yes	7
Syria			1				1
Thailand			1				1
United Arab Emirates			3			Yes	3
United States	3	3	3	Yes	Yes	Yes	9
Venezuela	1		1				2
Total: 49 NOCs	60	65	75	15	16	20	200

== Dressage ==
=== Team ===
Event	Date	Venue	Vacancies	Qualified
Host Nation	–	–	1	France
2022 FEI World Championships	August 6–10, 2022	(Denmark) Herning	6	Denmark; Great Britain; Germany; Sweden; Netherlands; United States
2023 FEI European Dressage Championships (Groups A and B)	September 4–10, 2023	(Germany) Riesenbeck	3	Austria; Belgium; Spain
2023 Group C qualification event	June 7–11, 2023	(Hungary) Pilisjászfalu	1	Poland
2023 Pan American Games (Groups D and E)	October 22–25, 2023	(Chile) Santiago	1	~~Brazil~~^{1} Canada
Group F qualification event	2023	–	0	–^{2}
2022 FEI World Championships (Group G)	August 6–10, 2022	(Denmark) Herning	1	Australia
Composite teams	December 31, 2023	–	2	Portugal; Finland
Total			15	

=== Individual ===
Event	Date	Venue	Vacancies	Qualified NOCs
Team Members	—	—	45	See above
2023 Pan American Games (Groups D and E)	October 22–25, 2023	(Chile) Santiago	2	Ecuador; Brazil^{1}
FEI Olympic Athletes Ranking – Dressage
Group A (North Western Europe)	December 31, 2023	—	2	Norway; Ireland
Group B (South Western Europe)	December 31, 2023	—	2	Luxembourg; Switzerland
Group C (Central & Eastern Europe; Central Asia)	December 31, 2023	—	2	Lithuania; Moldova
Groups D and E (Americas)	December 31, 2023	—	2	Dominican Republic; Venezuela
Group F (Africa & Middle East)	December 31, 2023	—	1	Morocco; ~~Palestine~~^{3}
Group G (South East Asia, Oceania)	December 31, 2023	—	2	New Zealand; Singapore
Additional	December 31, 2023	—	2	India; South Korea^{3}
Total			60	

^1 – Brazil initially qualified a team, but failed to provide the NOC Certificate of Capability by December 31, 2023. As a result, their team quota got reallocated to a Composite team, while Brazil received one individual spot through Pan American Games.
^2 – Group F qualification event was not held. As a result, the respective team quota got reallocated to a Composite team.
^3 – Palestine obtained an individual spot in dressage, but was not able to fulfill the MER criteria of 67%, which resulted in an individual spot for South Africa. Since South Africa does not have a contender, the spot would move up to the second reserve in Group F, Qatar, who has also no rider. South Korea is not part of Group F but of Group G, but is the highest ranked in the FEI Olympic Ranking, since South Africa and Qatar were not able to send a representative.

== Eventing ==
=== Team ===
Event	Date	Venue	Vacancies	Qualified NOCs
Host Nation	—	—	1	France
2022 Eventing World Championships	September 15–18, 2022	(Italy) Pratoni del Vivaro	7	Germany; United States; New Zealand; Great Britain; Ireland; Sweden; Switzerland
2023 European Eventing Championships (Groups A and B)	August 9–13, 2023	(France) Le Pin-au-Haras	2	Belgium; Netherlands
2023 Group C qualification event	May 18–21, 2023	(Poland) Baborowko	1	Poland
2023 Pan American Games (Groups D and E)	October 27–29, 2023	(Chile) Santiago	2	Canada; Brazil
Groups F and G qualification event	June 1–4, 2023	(Republic of Ireland) Millstreet	2	Australia; ~~China~~^{1} Japan
2023 Eventing Nations Cup	March 9 – October 8, 2023	Various	1	Italy
Total			16	

=== Individual ===
Event	Vacancies	Qualified NOCs
Team Members	48	See above
FEI Olympic Athletes Ranking – Eventing
Group A (North Western Europe)	2	Denmark; Finland
Group B (South Western Europe)	2	Spain; Austria
Group C (Central & Eastern Europe; Central Asia)	2	~~Lithuania~~; Hungary; Czech Republic
Groups D and E (Americas)	2	~~Argentina~~; ~~Chile~~; Ecuador; Ecuador
Group F (Africa & Middle East)	2	South Africa; Morocco
Group G (South East Asia, Oceania)	2	China; China
Additional	5	Spain; Finland; Czech Republic; Portugal; Austria
Total	65	

^1 Further to a Controlled Medication positive case and related disqualification of the results.
^2 Argentina and Chile obtained both an individual spot in eventing, but withdrew last minute in which Austria and Portugal received the open individual spots according to the FEI Olympic Ranking.

== Jumping ==
=== Team ===
Event	Date	Venue	Vacancies	Qualified NOCs
Host Nation	—	—	1	France
2022 FEI World Championships	August 10–14, 2022	(Denmark) Herning	5	Sweden; Netherlands; Great Britain; Ireland; Germany
2022 Jumping Nations Cup Final	September 29 – October 2, 2022	(Spain) Barcelona	1	Belgium
2023 European Jumping Championships (Groups A and B)	August 29 – September 3, 2023	(Italy) Milan	3	Austria; Spain; Switzerland
2023 Group C qualification event	July 27–30, 2023	(Czech Republic) Prague	2	Israel; Poland
2023 Pan American Games (Groups D and E)	October 31 – November 3, 2023	(Chile) Santiago	3	United States; Canada; Mexico
2023 Group F qualification event	February 27 – March 1, 2023	(Qatar) Doha	2	Saudi Arabia; United Arab Emirates
2023 Group G qualification event	July 18, 2023	(Netherlands) Valkenswaard	2	Australia; Japan
2023 Jumping Nations Cup Final	September 28 – October 1, 2023	(Spain) Barcelona	1	Brazil
Total			20	

=== Individual ===
Event	Date	Venue	Vacancies	Qualified NOCs
Team Members	—	—	60	See above
2023 Pan American Games (Groups D and E)	October 31 – November 3, 2023	(Chile) Santiago	3	Colombia; Argentina; Chile
FEI Olympic Athletes Ranking – Jumping
Group A (North Western Europe)	December 31, 2023	—	2	Denmark; Norway
Group B (South Western Europe)	December 31, 2023	—	2	Italy; Portugal
Group C (Central & Eastern Europe; Central Asia)	December 31, 2023	—	2	Latvia; Greece
Groups D and E (Americas)	December 31, 2023	—	1	Venezuela
Group F (Africa & Middle East)	December 31, 2023	—	2	Egypt; Syria
Group G (South East Asia, Oceania)	December 31, 2023	—	2	Thailand; ~~New Zealand~~^{1}
Additional	December 31, 2023	—	1	~~Luxembourg~~; Lithuania; Estonia^{1}
Total			75	

^1 New Zealand obtained in individual spot in show-jumping but withdrew last minute, which resulted in an individual spot for Estonia which was the first country in line according to the FEI Olympic Ranking.
