= Wronki =

Town in Greater Poland Voivodeship, Poland

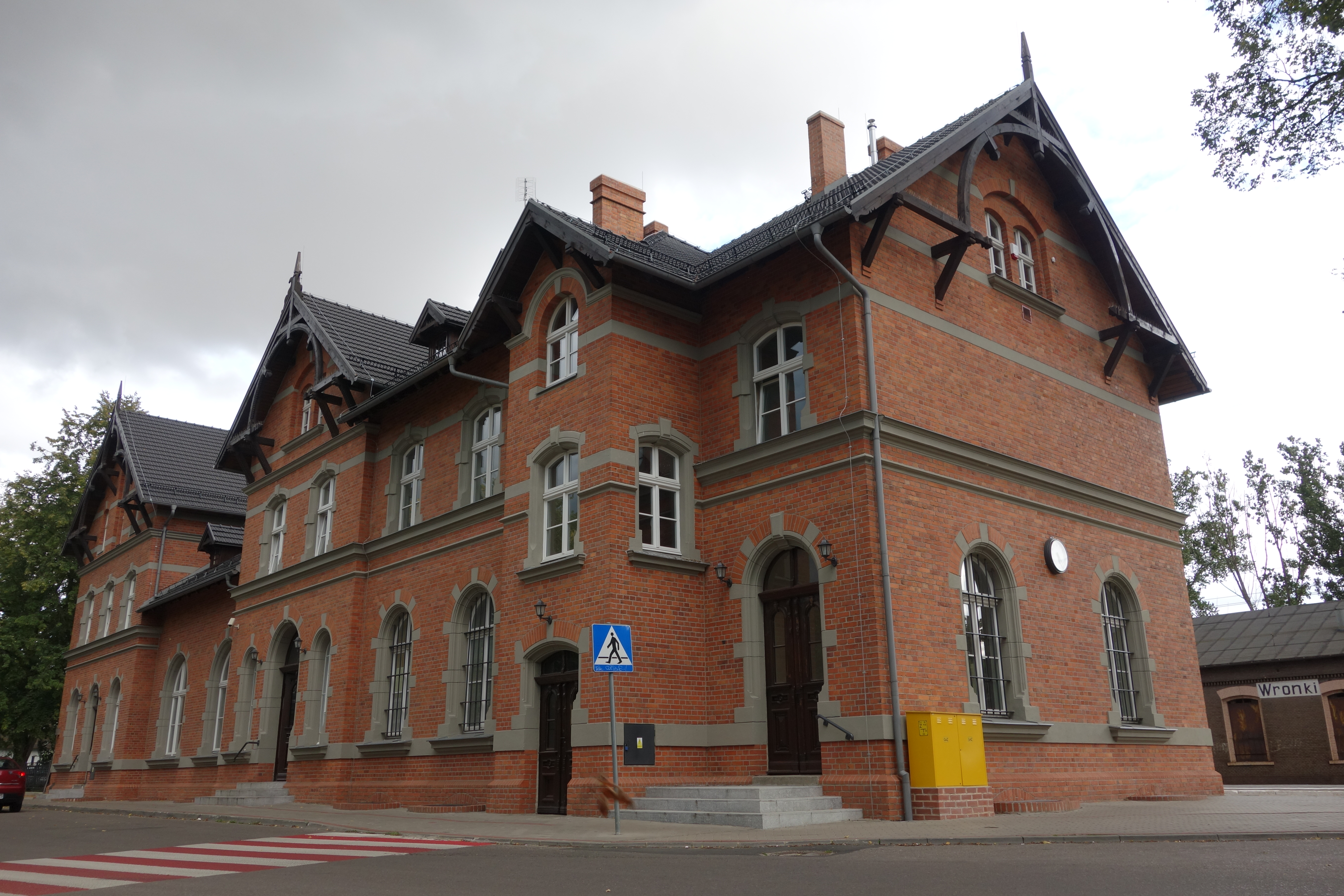
- Wronki railway station

- Flag Coat of arms Wordmark
- Interactive map of Wronki
- Location within Poland
- Coordinates: 52°42′N 16°23′E
- Country: Poland
- Voivodeship: Greater Poland
- County: Szamotuły
- Gmina: Wronki

Government
  - Mayor: Rafał Zimny

Area
  - Total: 5.81 km^{2} (2.24 sq mi)

Population (2006)
  - Total: 11,551
  - Density: 1,990/km^{2} (5,150/sq mi)
- Time zone: UTC+1 (CET)
  - Summer (DST): UTC+2 (CEST)
- Postal code: 64-510
- Vehicle registration: PSZ
- Website: www.wronki.pl

Wronki [ˈvrɔŋki] is a town in the Szamotuły County, western-central Poland, situated in the Greater Poland Voivodeship. It is located close to the Warta River to the northwest of Poznań on the edge of Noteć Forest, and has a population of approximately 11,000.

== History ==
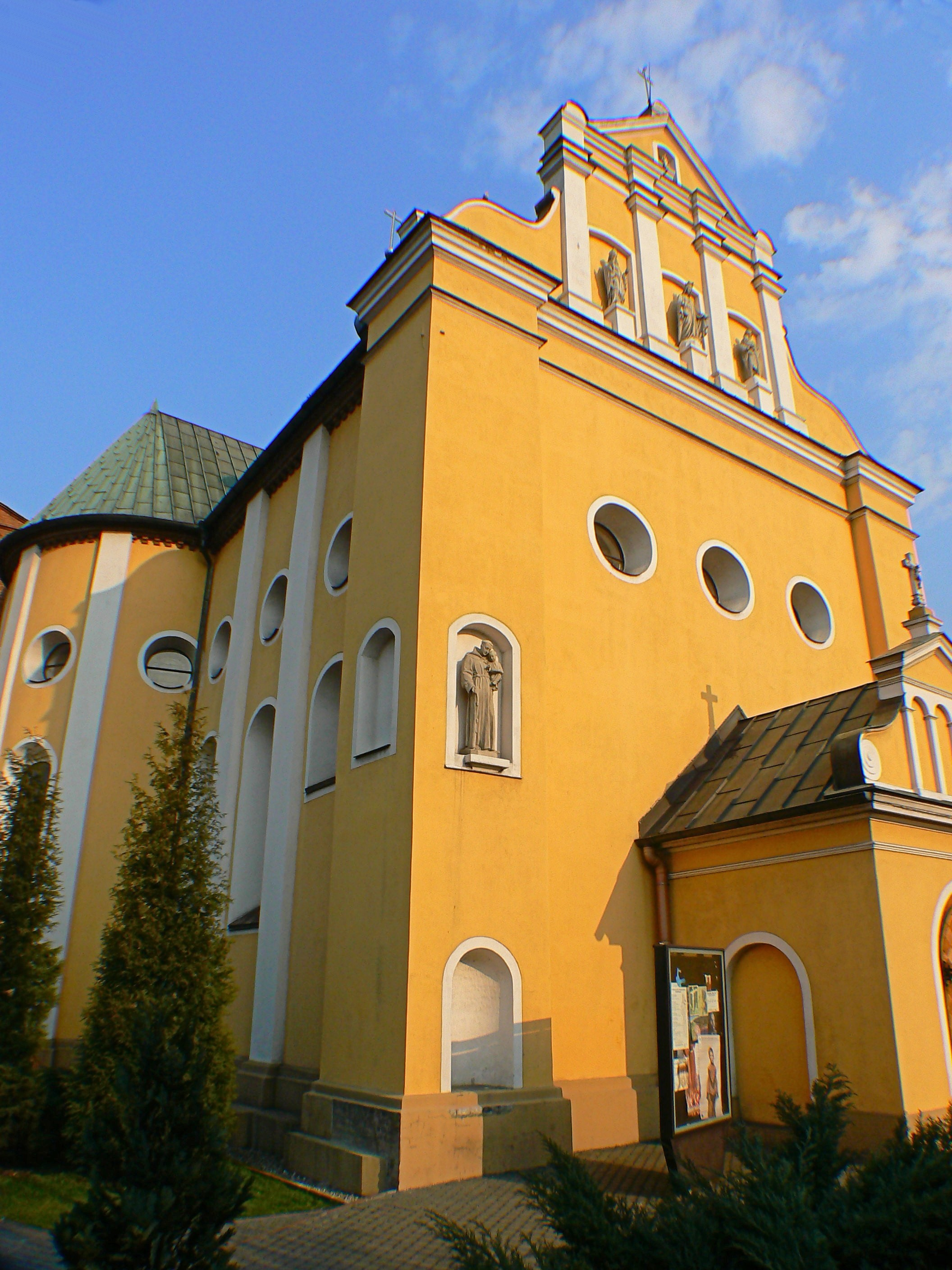
Baroque Franciscan Church

The town's name comes from wrona, the Polish word for a crow, which is also reflected in the town's coat of arms. According to local rumour, in 1002 Boleslaw the Bold was once caught offside on the banks of Wronki River. The oldest known mention of Wronki comes from 1279. Trade and crafts developed in the Late Middle Ages, due to the town's location both on the Warta river and on the trade route which connected major cities Poznań and Szczecin. At various times Wronki was either a royal town of the Polish Crown or a private town of Polish nobility. Administratively it was located in the Poznań County in the Poznań Voivodeship in the Greater Poland Province of the Kingdom of Poland.

It was annexed by Prussia in 1793 in the Second Partition of Poland. After the successful Greater Poland uprising of 1806, it was regained by Poles and included within the short-lived Duchy of Warsaw. After the duchy's dissolution, the town was re-annexed by Prussia in 1815, and from 1871 to 1919 it also was part of Germany. The name was Germanized to Wronke when it was part of Prussia and Germany. The population was subjected to Germanisation policies, nevertheless it remained a center of Polish resistance, and Poles established various educational, industrial and sporting organizations, also one of the oldest Polish volunteer fire departments was founded in the town. At the beginning of the 20th century, Jews were 18% of the total population. After World War I, the number decreased because Wronki was restored to Poland after the country regained independence, and the Jews of Wronki belonged to the German culture. In 1932, the German-language journal Die Stimme published an article stating that in 933, a synagogue - the first in Poland - was constructed in Wronki, and in 1933 Jews near Wronki celebrated what they believed to be the millennium of Jewish life in Poland.

During the German occupation of Poland (World War II), the Polish population was subjected to mass arrests, imprisonment, massacres, deportations to forced labour to Germany and expulsions (see Nazi crimes against the Polish nation). In November and December 1939, inhabitants of Wronki were among Poles murdered in mass executions in Mędzisko and Szamotuły, and in 1940 the Germans murdered 280 Poles, previously held in the local prison, in the Kobylniki forest. In December 1939, the German police and Selbstschutz expelled many Poles, mostly the intelligentsia, and owners of shops and workshops. Several Poles were held by the Germans in the local prison for aiding and rescuing Jews.

From 1978 to 1998, it was administratively located in the former Piła Voivodeship.

== Economy ==
The town is a major hub for white goods, most notably the headquarters of Amica SA, who hail from the town, and is also where Samsung Electronics Manufacturing Poland who produce washing machines and fridges in the town.

The town also contains Wronki Prison, the largest prison in Poland.

== Main sights ==
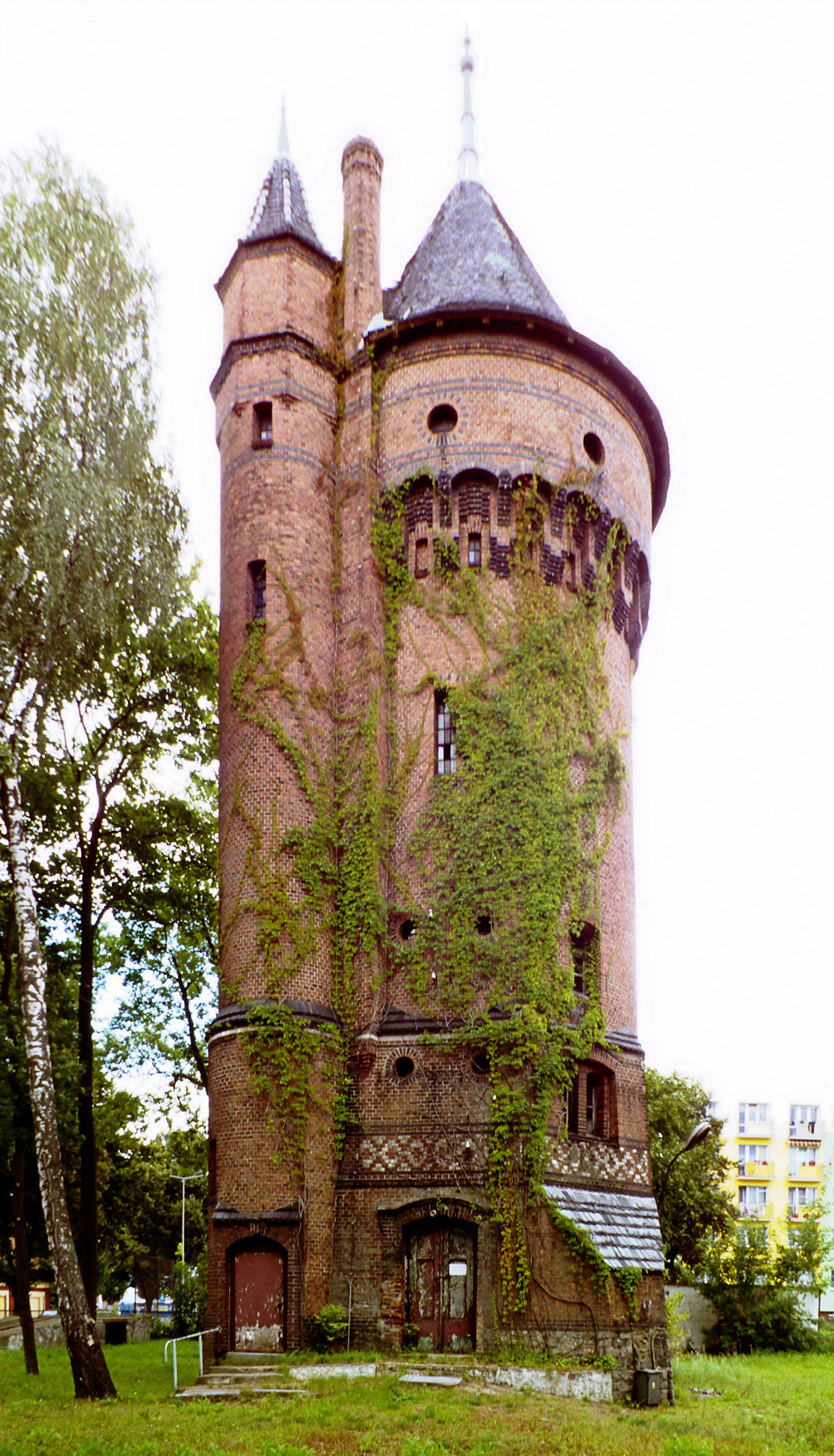
Old water tower

- St. Catherine's church - Gothic church built towards the end of the 15th century
- Franciscan monastery with the church of the Annunciation - Baroque monastery complex built in the 17th century according to a design by Krzysztof Bonadura senior
- Holy Cross chapel - built in 1887 by Jadwiga Słodowicz
- Historic granary, now housing the Regional Museum and a public library
- Lapidarium of Jewish Tombstones

== Sports ==
The town is represented by football club Błękitni Wronki, the predecessor and successor of Amica Wronki, who were three times Polish Cup and two times Polish SuperCup winners, and who competed in Poland's top division from 1995 to 2006, and in the UEFA Cup in the early 2000s. Currently the town is home to the academy of Lech Poznań and the home for their reserve team, Lech Poznań II.

Wronki co-hosted the 2006 UEFA European Under-19 Championship and 2014 European Under-18 Rugby Union Championship.

== Transport ==
The Wronki railway station is located on the Poznań–Szczecin railway, and the city has railway connections with major Polish cities like Poznań, Szczecin, Wrocław, Kraków and Katowice.

== Notable people ==
- Wincenty Kruziński (1840–1928), Polish composer
- Adolf Pinner (1842–1909), German chemist
- Hans Ferdinand Emil Julius Stichel (1862–1936), German biologist
- Bernhard Zondek (1891–1966), Israeli gynaecologist
- Else Koffka (1901–1994), German lawyer
- Rafał Grupiński (born 1952), Polish politician
- Leopold Treitel (1845–1931) German Jewish classical scholar

=== Other residents ===
- Rosa Luxemburg (1871–1919), Polish Marxist, imprisoned in Wronki by German authorities during World War I
- Carl Maria Splett (1898–1964), Catholic bishop
