= Poznań Dębina railway station =

Railway station in Poznań, Poland

Coordinates: 52.3738°N 16.9097°E

Poznań Dębina
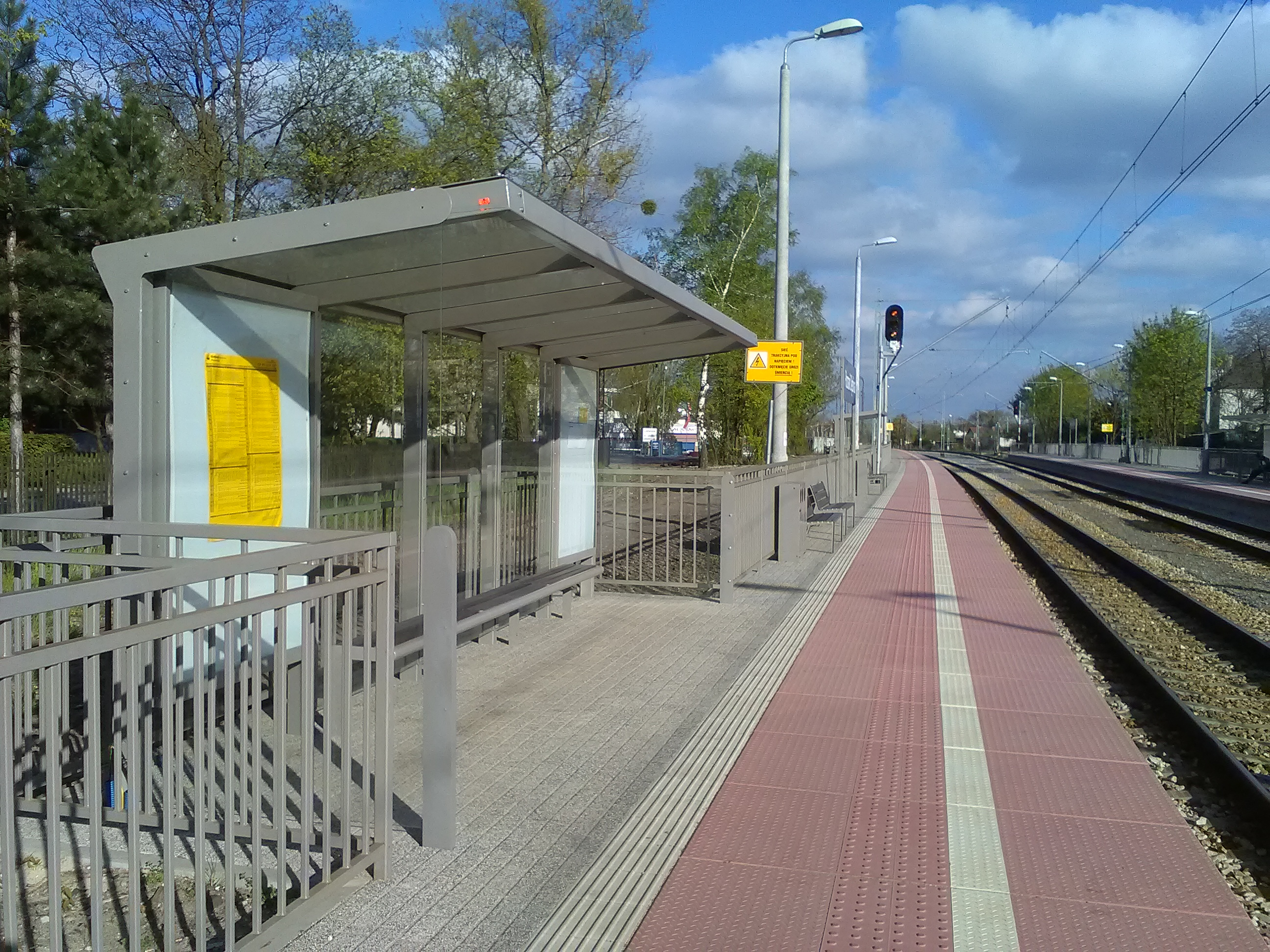
- Poznań Dębina railway station

General information
- Location: Poznań, Greater Poland Voivodeship; Poland
- System: Railway Station
- Operator: Polregio
- Line: Kluczbork–Poznań railway
- Platforms: 2
- Tracks: 2

History
- Opened: 1 February 1883; 143 years ago

Services
Preceding station	Polregio	Following station
Poznań Główny Terminus	IR	Poznań Starołęka towards Warszawa Główna
Poznań Główny Terminus	PR	Poznań Starołęka towards Łódź Kaliska
Preceding station	KW	Following station
Poznań Główny Terminus	Poznań - Milicz	Poznań Starołęka towards Milicz
Poznań Główny Terminus	Poznań - Odolanów	Poznań Starołęka towards Odolanów
Poznań Główny Terminus	Poznań - Kępno	Poznań Starołęka towards Kępno
Poznań Główny Terminus	Poznań - Łódź (Co-operated with Łódzka Kolej Aglomeracyjna)	Poznań Starołęka towards Łódź Kaliska
Poznań Główny Terminus	Poznań - Kalisz	Poznań Starołęka towards Kalisz
Preceding station	Poznań Metropolitan Railway	Following station
Poznań Główny railway station towards Wronki	PKM4	Poznań Starołęka towards Środa Wielkopolska
Location
- Location within Poland Location within Greater Poland Voivodeship

Poznań Dębina railway station is a railway stop serving the Wilda neighbourhood of the city of Poznań, in the Greater Poland Voivodeship, Poland. The station opened on 1 February 1870 and is located on the Kluczbork–Poznań railway. The train services are operated by Polregio.

== History ==
The stop was closed during the first world war; it reopened in 1938. In 1970 a new stop opened, located east of the railway crossing on Wiśniowa street.

== Train services ==
The station is served by the following service(s):

- InterRegio services (IR) Poznań Główny — Ostrów Wielkopolski — Łódź — Warszawa Główna
- Regional services (PR) Łódź Kaliska — Ostrów Wielkopolski — Poznań Główny
