= Poznań Starołęka railway station =

Railway station in Poznań, Poland

Poznań Starołęka
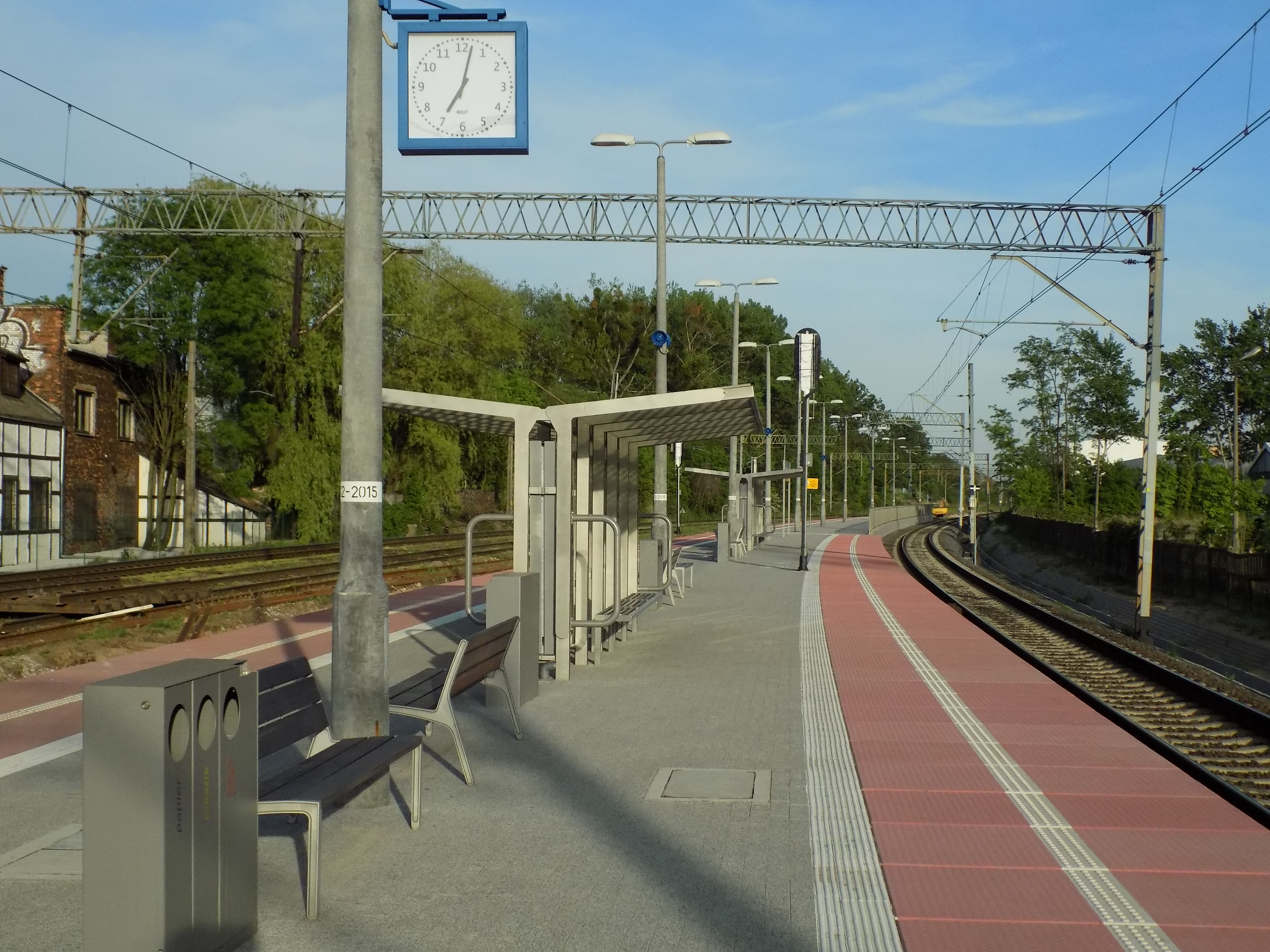
- Poznań Starołęka railway station

General information
- Location: Poznań, Greater Poland Voivodeship; Poland
- Coordinates: 52°22′00″N 16°55′59″E
- System: Railway Station
- Operator: Polregio
- Lines: 272: Kluczbork–Poznań railway 352: Swarzędz-Poznań Starołęka railway (freight)
- Platforms: 2
- Tracks: 4

History
- Rebuilt: 2015-2016

Services
Preceding station	Polregio	Following station
Poznań Dębina towards Poznań Główny	IR	Poznań Krzesiny towards Warszawa Główna
Poznań Dębina towards Poznań Główny	PR	Poznań Krzesiny towards Łódź Kaliska
Preceding station	ŁKA	Following station
Poznań Dębina towards Łódź Fabryczna	Łódź - Poznań (jointly operated with Greater Poland Railways)	Poznań Krzesiny towards Poznań Główny
Preceding station	KW	Following station
Poznań Dębina towards Poznań Główny	Poznań - Milicz	Poznań Krzesiny towards Milicz
Poznań Dębina towards Poznań Główny	Poznań - Odolanów	Poznań Krzesiny towards Odolanów
Poznań Dębina towards Poznań Główny	Poznań - Kępno	Poznań Krzesiny towards Kępno
Poznań Dębina towards Poznań Główny	Poznań - Łódź (Co-operated with Łódzka Kolej Aglomeracyjna)	Środa Wielkopolska towards Łódź Kaliska
Poznań Dębina towards Poznań Główny	Poznań - Kalisz	Poznań Krzesiny towards Kalisz
Preceding station	Poznań Metropolitan Railway	Following station
Poznań Dębina towards Wronki	PKM4	Poznań Starołęka towards Środa Wielkopolska
Location
- Location within Poland Location within Greater Poland Voivodeship

Poznań Starołęka railway station is a railway station serving Starołęka in the city of Poznań, in the Greater Poland Voivodeship, Poland. The station is located on the Kluczbork–Poznań railway and Swarzędz-Poznań Starołęka railway. The train services are operated by Polregio.

The station was known as Posen Luisenhain during German control.

== History ==
On 15 September 1943 there two trains collided at the station.

== Modernisation ==
During 2015 and 2016 the platform and tracks around the station were modernised and replaced.

== Train services ==
The station is served by the following service(s):

- InterRegio services (IR) Poznań Główny — Ostrów Wielkopolski — Łódź — Warszawa Główna
- Regional services (PR) Łódź Kaliska — Ostrów Wielkopolski — Poznań Główny

== Bus and Tram services ==
- 4 (Polabska - Armii Poznan - Most Teatralny - Male Garbary - Rondo Srodka - Rondo Rataje - Rondo Staroleka - Staroleka)
- 11 (Piatkowska - Most Teatralny - Dworzec Zachodni - Glogowska - Traugutta - Rondo Staroleka - Staroleka)
- 12 (Os. Sobieskiego - Most Teatralny - Poznan Glowny - Rondo Rataje - Rondo Staroleka - Staroleka)
- 13 (Junikowo - INEA Stadion - Rondo Jana Nowaka Jezioranskiego - Baltyk - Marcinkowskiego - Rondo Rataje - Rondo Staroleka - Staroleka)
- 17 (Rynek Jezycki - Most Teatralny - Male Garbary - Rondo Srodka - Zegrze - Rondo Staroleka - Staroleka)
- 58 (Staroleka - Gluszyna - Sypniewo)
- 65 (Rondo Rataje -Zegrze - Staroleka)
- 89 (Staroleka Circular)
- 94 (Staroleka Circular)
- 527 (Staroleka - Wiorek - Kamionki)
