= Poznań Krzesiny railway station =

Railway station in Poznań, Poland

Coordinates: 52.3417°N 16.9756°E

Poznań Krzesiny
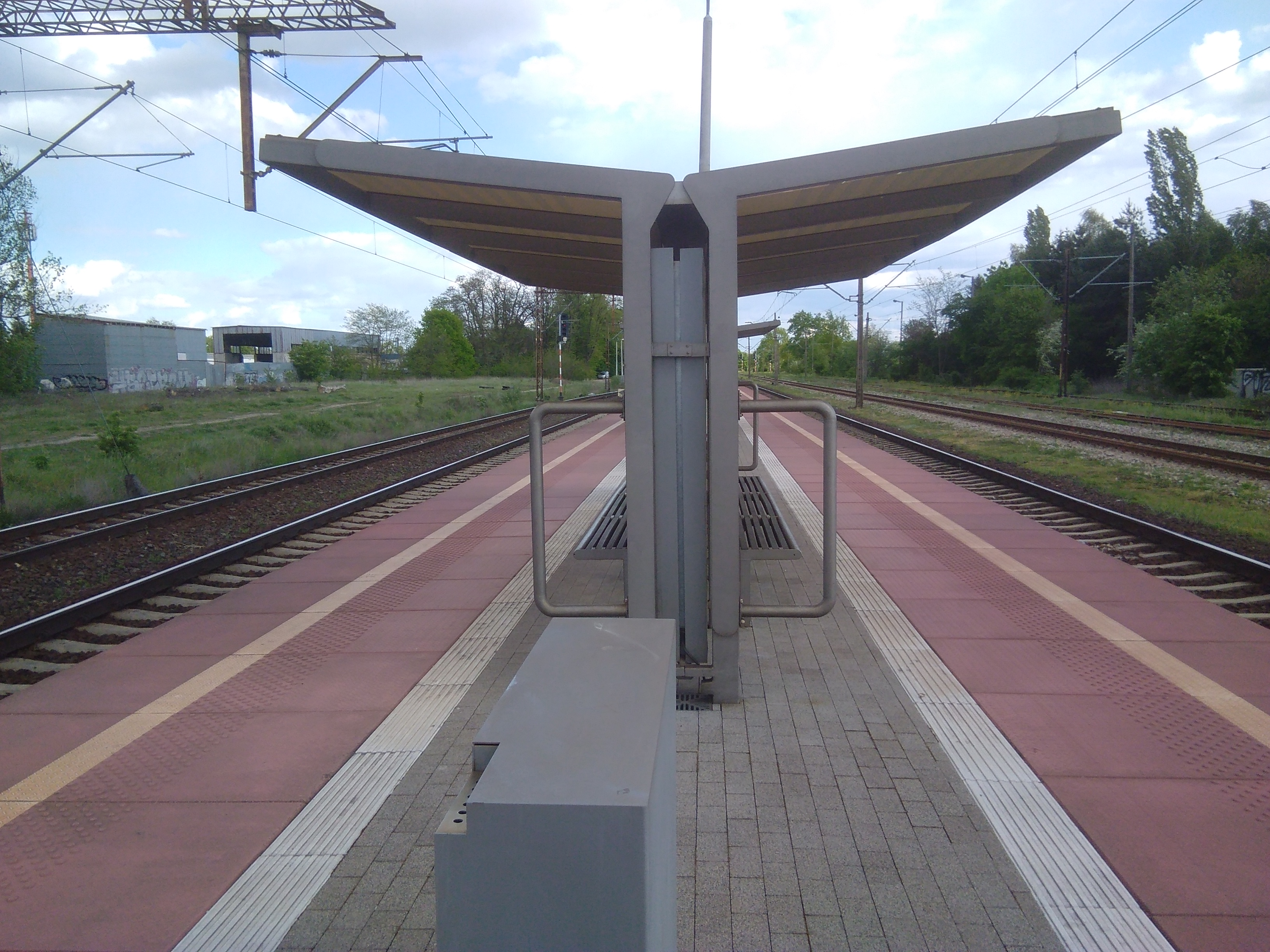
- Poznań Krzesiny railway station

General information
- Location: Poznań, Greater Poland Voivodeship; Poland
- System: Railway Station
- Operator: Polregio
- Lines: 353: Kluczbork–Poznań railway 394: Poznań Krzesiny–Kobylnica railway (freight)
- Platforms: 2
- Tracks: 5

Services
Preceding station	Polregio	Following station
Poznań Starołęka towards Poznań Główny	IR	Gądki towards Warszawa Główna
Poznań Starołęka towards Poznań Główny	PR	Gądki towards Łódź Kaliska
Preceding station	ŁKA	Following station
Środa Wielkopolska towards Łódź Fabryczna	Łódź - Poznań (jointly operated with Greater Poland Railways)	Poznań Starołęka towards Poznań Główny
Preceding station	KW	Following station
Poznań Starołęka towards Poznań Główny	Poznań - Milicz	Gądki towards Milicz
Poznań Starołęka towards Poznań Główny	Poznań - Odolanów	Gądki towards Odolanów
Poznań Starołęka towards Poznań Główny	Poznań - Kępno	Gądki towards Kępno
Poznań Starołęka towards Poznań Główny	Poznań - Kalisz	Gądki towards Kalisz
Preceding station	Poznań Metropolitan Railway	Following station
Poznań Starołęka towards Wronki	PKM4	Gądki towards Środa Wielkopolska
Location
- Location within Poland Location within Greater Poland Voivodeship

Poznań Krzesiny railway station is a railway station serving the Krzesiny neighbourhood of the city of Poznań, in the Greater Poland Voivodeship, Poland. The station is located on the Kluczbork–Poznań railway and Poznań Krzesiny–Kobylnica railway. The train services are operated by Polregio.

== Train services ==
The station is served by the following service(s):

- InterRegio services (IR) Poznań Główny — Ostrów Wielkopolski — Łódź — Warszawa Główna
- Regional services (PR) Łódź Kaliska — Ostrów Wielkopolski — Poznań Główny
