= Wincenty Kruziński =

Polish composer

Wincenty Kruziński (1840, Wronki – 1928) was a Polish composer. He was the editor of the main Polish music journal Echo Muzyczne in its first four years (1877–1880). Kruziński's own compositions include piano pieces, songs and a Mass. He also published a handbook on music composition (Szkoła kompozycji muzycznej, 1899–1900).

== Sources ==
- "Ilustrowana Encyklopedia Trzaski, Ewerta i Michalskiego" (1923–1927). tom 4, str. 516
- "Polski Słownik Biograficzny" t. 15, s. 448
