= Else Koffka =

German judge and lawyer (1901–1994)

Else Koffka (June 22, 1901 in Wronke – February 18, 1994 in Hannover) was a German lawyer and judge at the Federal Court in Berlin. She was one of the first women to do her doctorate at the Faculty of Law at the Humboldt University, again one of the first women who took a faculty assistant position at a university in Germany, becoming the first German lecturer in criminal law, who received a legal teaching assignment without previous habilitation. Since the early 1920s, Else Koffka belonged to numerous professional organizations and associations, including the German Academic Women's Association from 1921 until its dissolution in 1936, the German Lawyers Association from 1921 to its 1933 dissolution, the Legal Society Berlin, from 1924 the German Lawyer's Day, and from 1925 the International Criminal Association.
