= Rokietnica–Skwierzyna railway =

Railway line in Poland

Rokietnica–Skwierzyna

Overview
- Status: closed
- Locale: Poland
- Termini: Rokietnica; Skwierzyna

Service
- Type: Heavy rail
- Route number: 363

History
- Opened: 1887; 138 years ago
- Closed: 1995 passenger services Międzychód - Skwierzyna; 1999 passenger services Rokietnica - Międzychód; 2002 freight services

Technical
- Line length: 92 km (57 mi)
- Track gauge: 1,435 mm (4 ft 8 1/2 in) standard gauge
- Electrification: no
- Operating speed: 60 km/h (37 mph)

The Rokietnica–Skwierzyna railway is a former Polish 92-kilometre long railway line, that connected Poznań with Rokietnica, Międzychód and further to Skwierzyna and Gorzów Wielkopolski.

== Opening ==
The line was opened in three stages:

- 1887: Międzychód - Wierzbno
- 1888: Rokietnica - Międzychód
- 1906: Wierzbno - Skwierzyna

== Closure ==
In 1995, passenger traffic was suspended on the route Międzychód - Skwierzyna. In October 1999 passenger services also ceased between Rokietnica - Międzychód. In 2002, the route was closed to freight traffic Rokietnica - Międzychód. The line became impassable and in 2006 was removed from the register of PKP PLK.

In November 2015 it was announced that the 63 kilometre stretch of line between Międzychód - Rokietnica would be dismantled.

== Usage ==
The line was used by passenger trains between Międzychód - Skwierzyna and Rokietnica - Międzychód. Freight services also used the line.

== Gallery ==
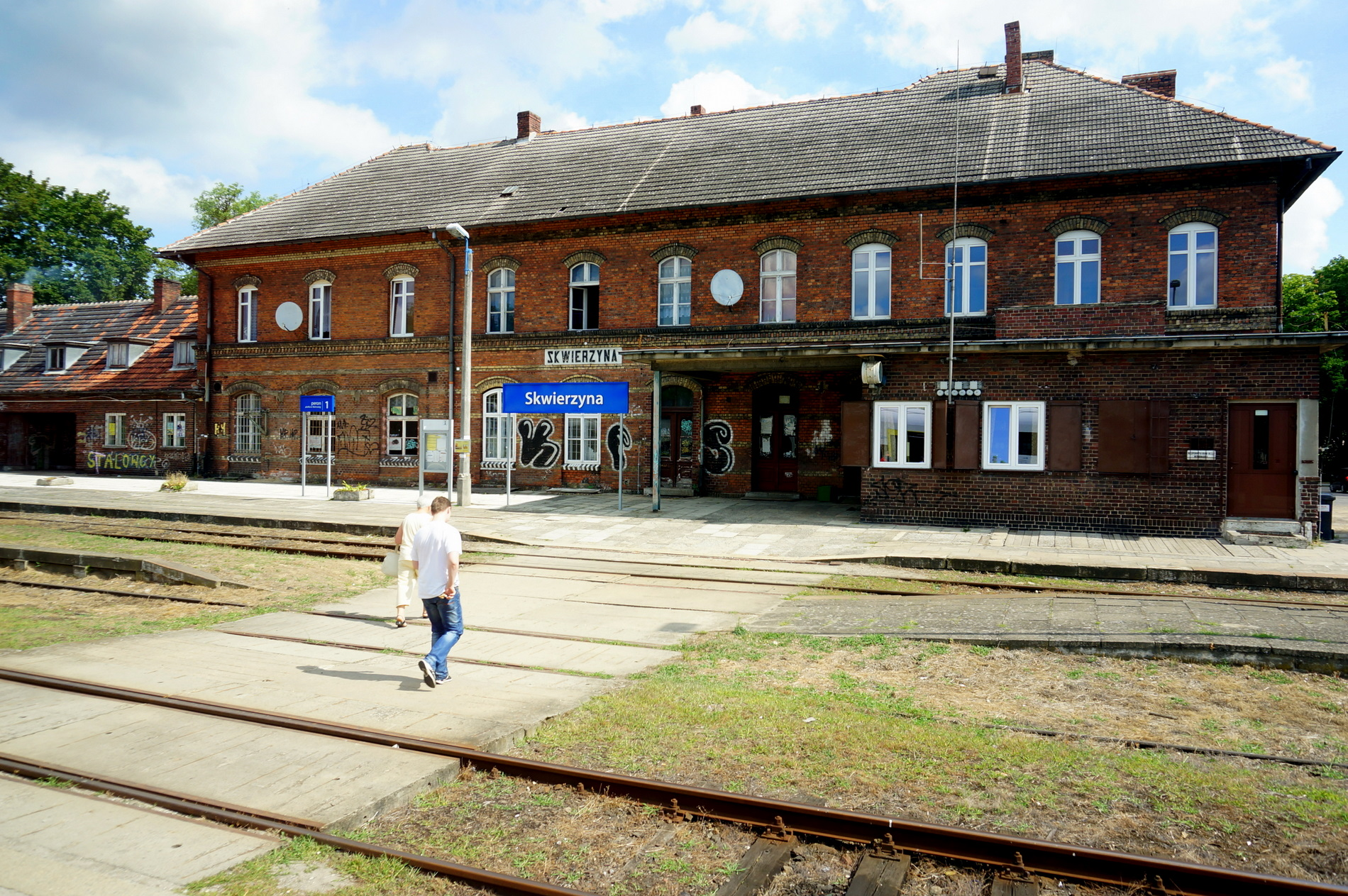
Skwierzyna station

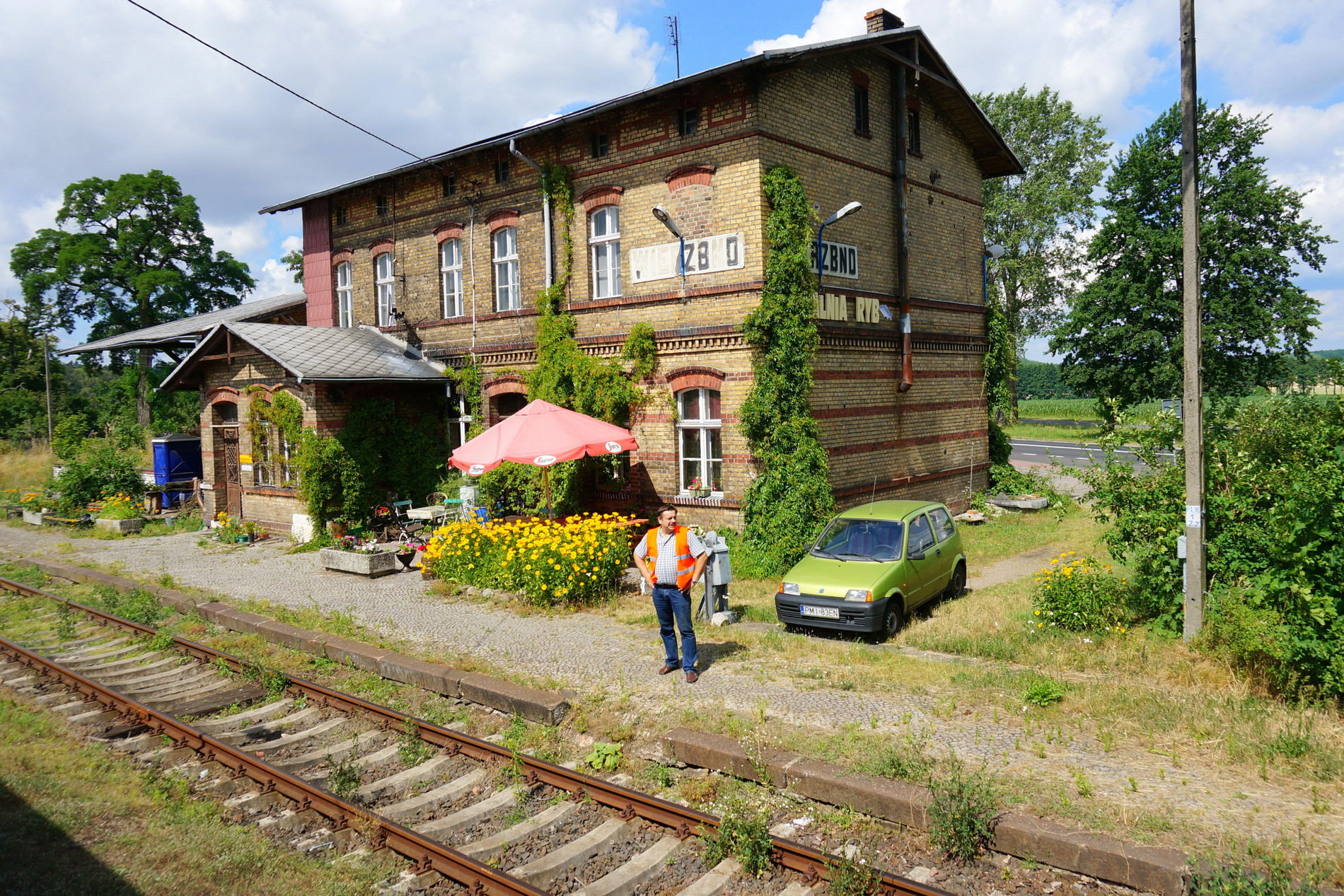
Wierzbno station

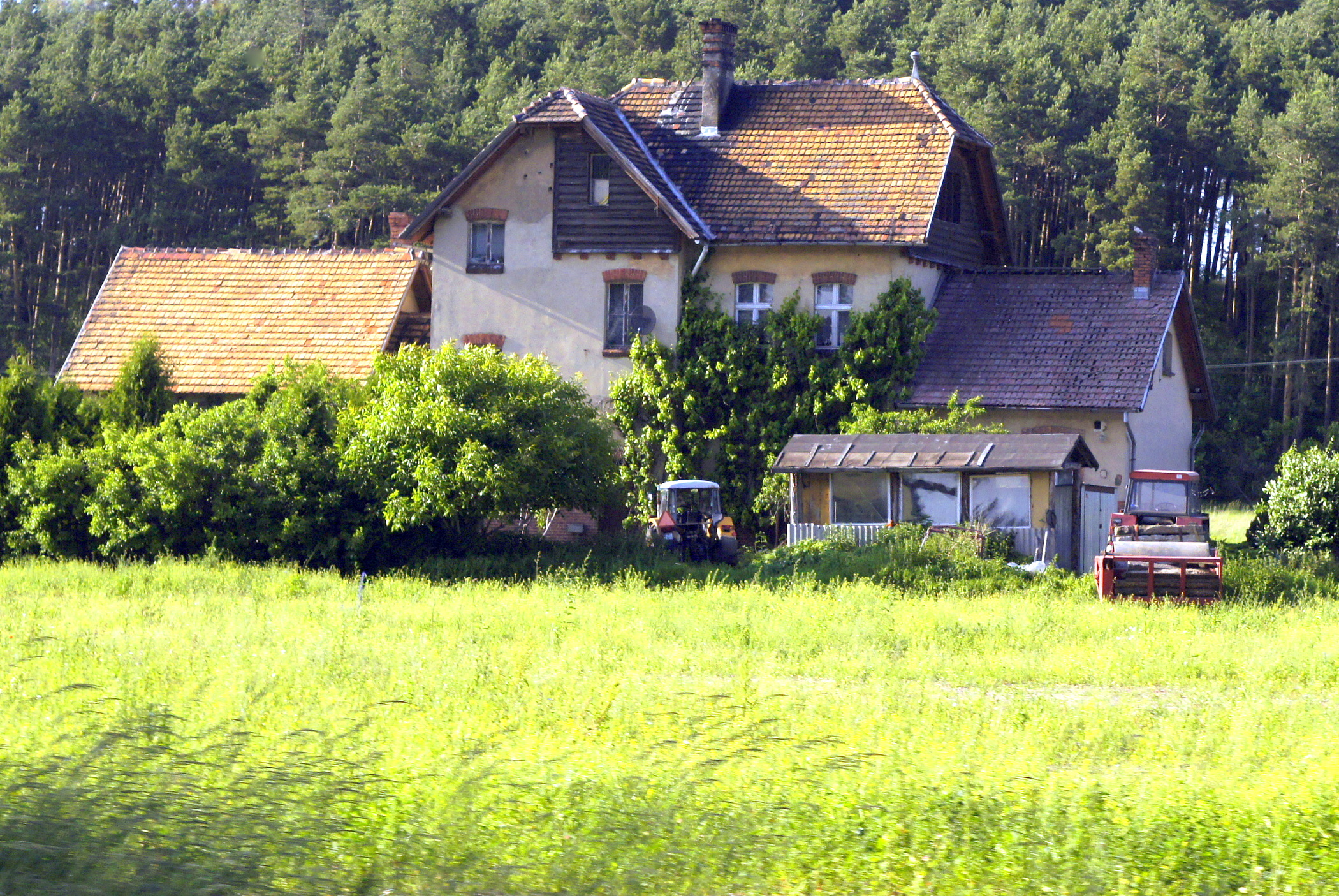
Goraj station

== See also ==
- Railway lines of Poland
