= Gądki =

- Village
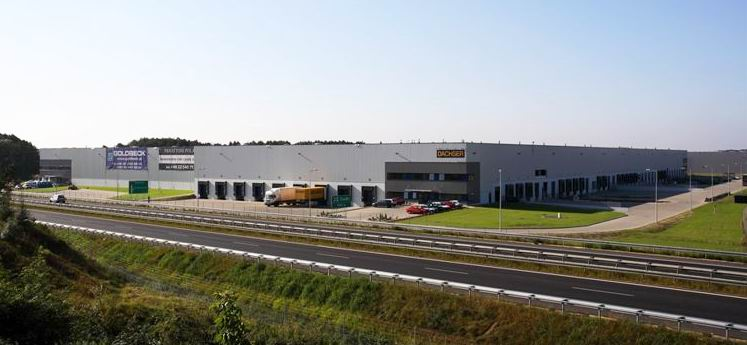

- Location within Poland
- Coordinates: 52°18′40″N 17°2′50″E
- Country: Poland
- Voivodeship: Greater Poland
- County: Poznań
- Gmina: Kórnik
- Elevation: 80 m (260 ft)
- Population: 500

Gądki (Polish: [ˈɡɔntkʲi]) is a village in the administrative district of Gmina Kórnik, within Poznań County, Greater Poland Voivodeship, in west-central Poland. The administrative district of Gądki is home to a goods logistics center, including a METRANS intermodal transport station.
