= Pamiątkowo =

- Village
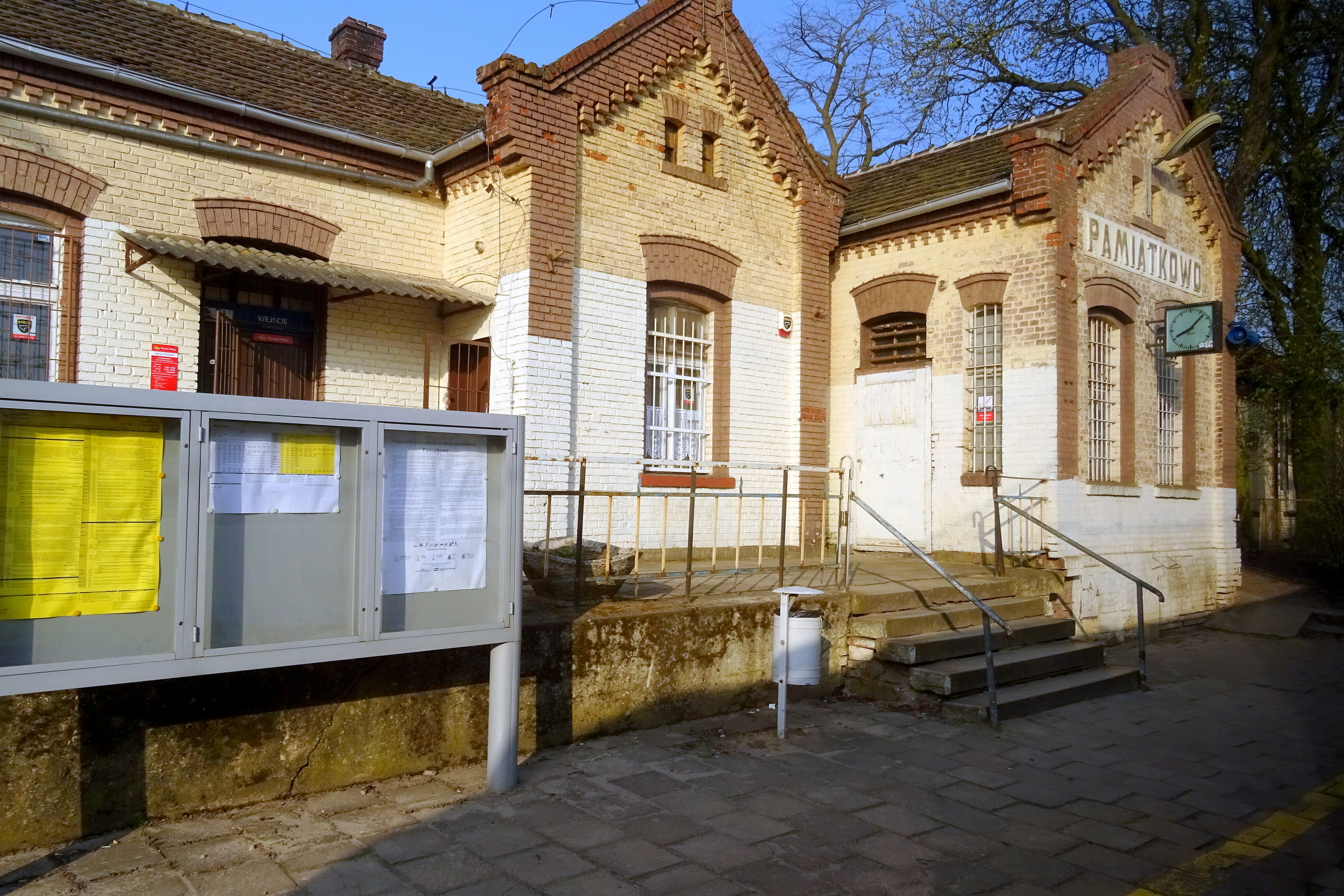
- Railway station

- Location within Poland
- Coordinates: 52°33′12″N 16°40′50″E
- Country: Poland
- Voivodeship: Greater Poland
- County: Szamotuły
- Gmina: Szamotuły

Population
  - Total: 1,200
- Time zone: UTC+1 (CET)
  - Summer (DST): UTC+2 (CEST)
- Vehicle registration: PSZ

Pamiątkowo [pamjõntkɔvɔ] is a village in the administrative district of Gmina Szamotuły, within Szamotuły County, Greater Poland Voivodeship, in west-central Poland.

It is situated on the northern shore of Pamiątkowskie Lake.

In the village the school named afted the Greater Poland's Uprisers is located.
