= Szamotuły–Międzychód railway =

Railway line in Poland

Szamotuły–Międzychód

Overview
- Status: closed
- Locale: Poland
- Termini: Szamotuły; Międzychód

Service
- Type: Heavy rail
- Route number: 368

History
- Opened: 1907; 118 years ago
- Closed: 1995 passenger services 1996 freight services

Technical
- Line length: 57 km (35 mi)
- Track gauge: 1,435 mm (4 ft 8 1/2 in) standard gauge
- Electrification: no
- Operating speed: 60 km/h (37 mph)

The Szamotuły–Międzychód railway is a former Polish 57-kilometre long railway line, that connected Szamotuły with Międzychód.

== Opening ==
The line was opened in four stages:

- October 1907: Szamotuły - Binino, Chrzypsko Wielkie - Międzychód
- April 1908: Binino - Nojewo, Nojewo - Chrzypsko Wielkie

== Modernisation ==
In 1977-1978 a major overhaul of the line took place, including stabilising embankments, replacement of wooden sleepers with concrete sleepers and replacement of the track.

In 2004, the first plans to take over the line from PKP PLK and launch passenger services were announced, but this did not lead to anything. In 2012, a proposal was made to build a cycle route along the course of the railway, but this met negative feedback from residents.

== Closure ==
In 1995, passenger traffic was suspended along the route. Freight services were suspended from 3 May 1996 between Sieraków Wielkopolski and Szamotuły. In later years, freight trains only ran between Sieraków Wielkopolski and Międzychód.

Despite the suspension of traffic on the line in 1996, the railway line remained in the list of railway lines of national importance until 2000.

== Usage ==
In the 1970s, passenger traffic from the station in Sierakowie was about 4,800 people per month, but this steadily decreased to 3,200 people in 1990. Since 2000, the line has occasionally been used for tourist trains using steam engines.

In August 2016, the section between Sieraków Wielkopolski and Lesionkami was used for manual trolley rides.

== Gallery ==
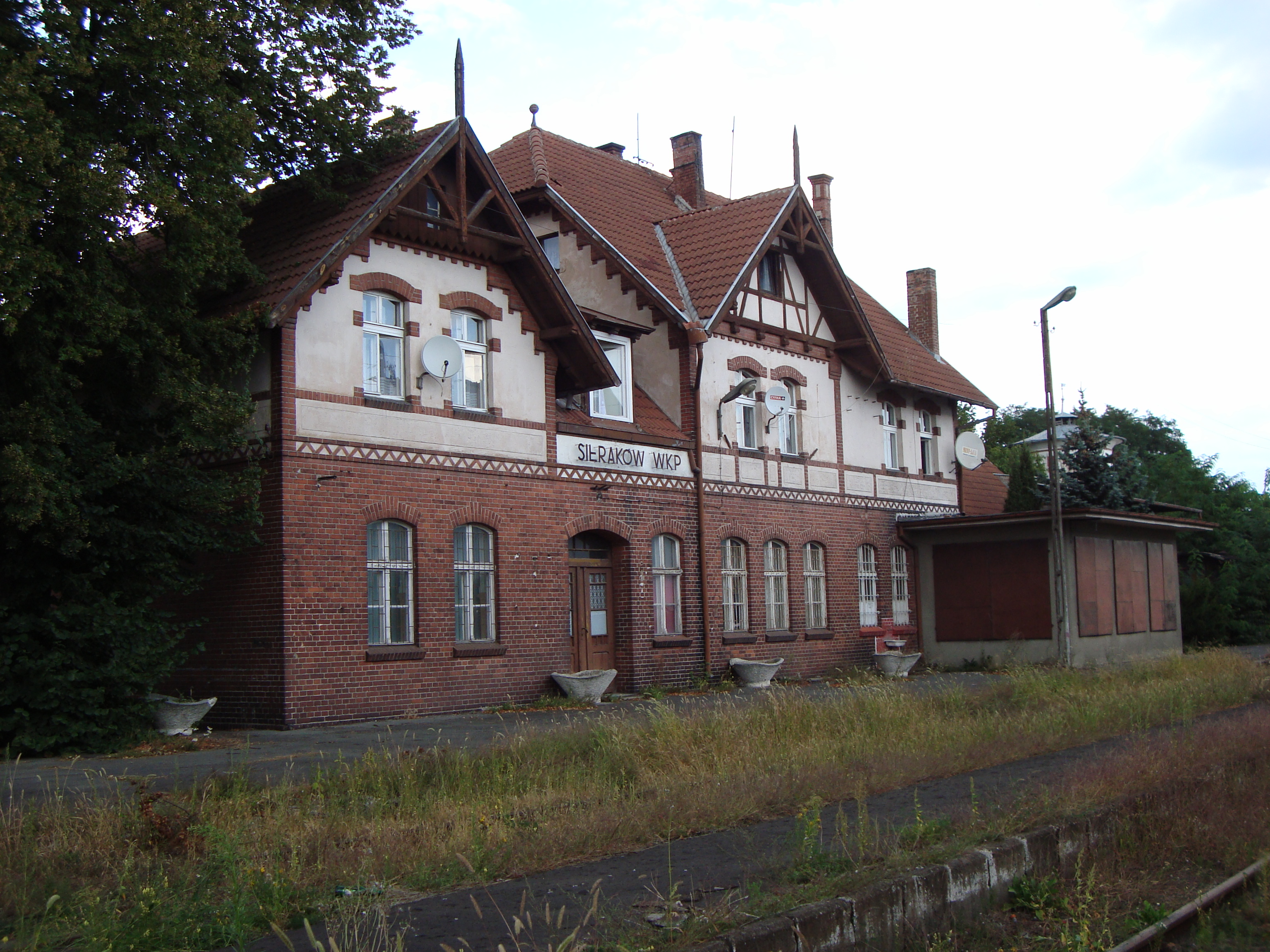
Sieraków station

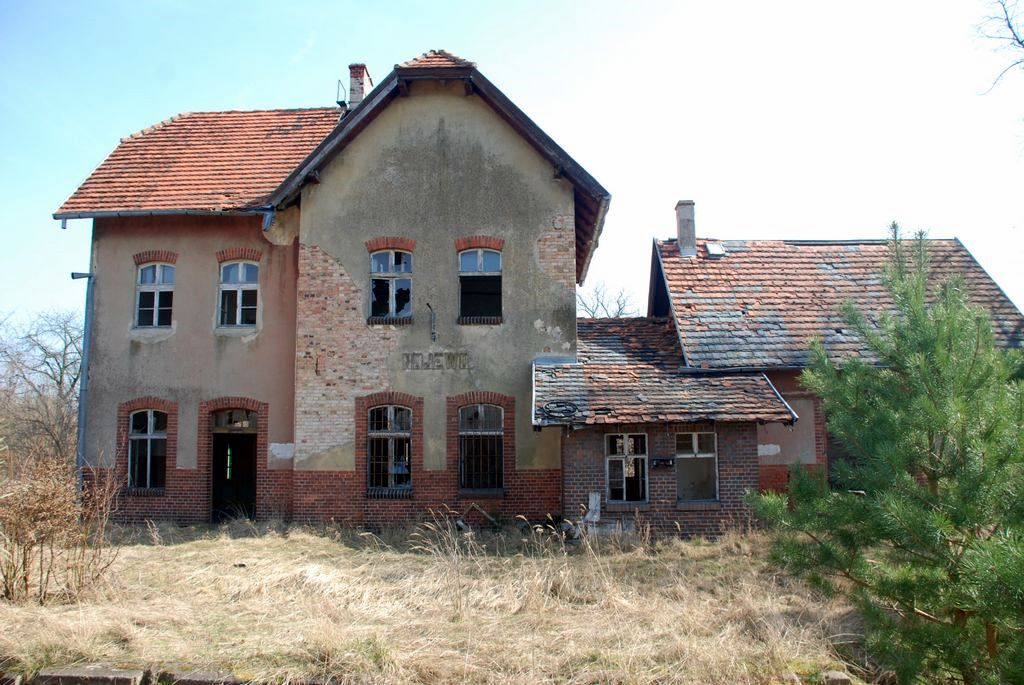
Nojewo station

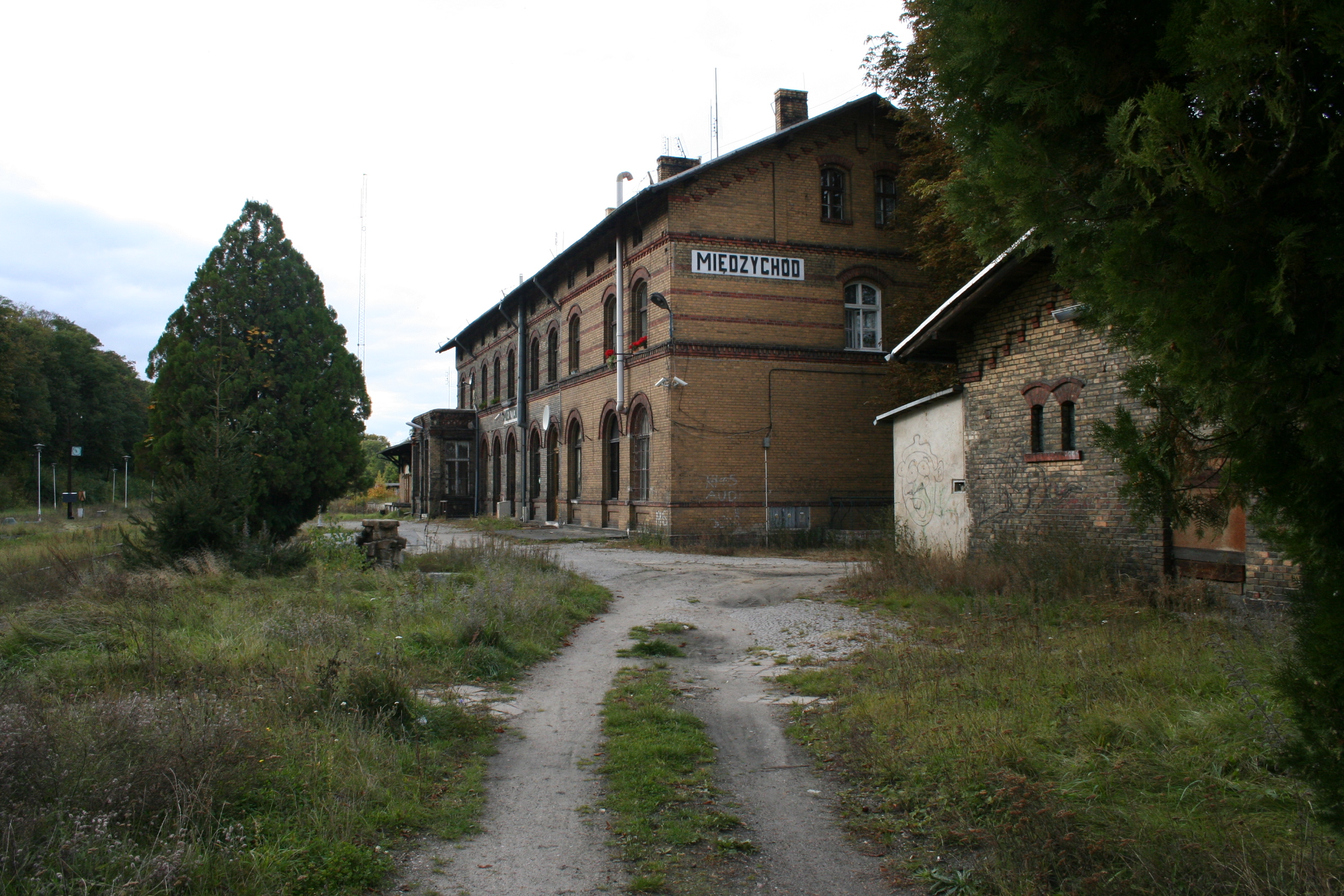
Międzychód station

== See also ==
- Railway lines of Poland
