= Mokrz =

- Village
- Location within Poland
- Coordinates: 52°44′44″N 16°16′15″E
- Country: Poland
- Voivodeship: Greater Poland
- County: Szamotuły
- Gmina: Wronki

Mokrz [mɔkʂ] is a village in the administrative district of Gmina Wronki, within Szamotuły County, Greater Poland Voivodeship, in west-central Poland.
