= Pilisjászfalu =

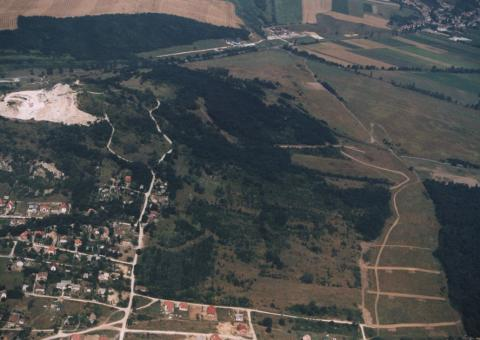

- Flag Coat of arms

- Location of Pilisjászfalu in Hungary
- Coordinates: 47.654721°N 18.795279°E
- Country: Hungary
- Region: Central Hungary
- County: Pest
- Subregion: Pilisvörösvári
- Rank: Village

Government
  - Mayor: Szántó Vilmos

Area
  - Total: 6.97 km^{2} (2.69 sq mi)

Population (1 January 2024)
  - Total: 2,138
  - Density: 307/km^{2} (794/sq mi)
- Time zone: UTC+1 (CET)
  - Summer (DST): UTC+2 (CEST)
- Postal code: 2080
- Area code: +36 26
- KSH code: 34148
- Website: www.pilisjaszfalu.hu

Pilisjászfalu is a village in Pest county, Budapest metropolitan area, Hungary. It has a population of 2,138 (2024).
