= Drawski Młyn =

- Village
- Location within Poland
- Coordinates: 52°52′N 16°5′E
- Country: Poland
- Voivodeship: Greater Poland
- County: Czarnków-Trzcianka
- Gmina: Drawsko
- Population: 960

Drawski Młyn [ˈdrafski ˈmwɨn] (German: Dratzigmühle) is a village in the administrative district of Gmina Drawsko, within Czarnków-Trzcianka County, Greater Poland Voivodeship, in west-central Poland.
