= Miały =

- Village
- Location within Poland
- Coordinates: 52°48′N 16°11′E
- Country: Poland
- Voivodeship: Greater Poland
- County: Czarnków-Trzcianka
- Gmina: Wieleń
- Population: 1,000

Miały [ˈmjawɨ] is a village in the administrative district of Gmina Wieleń, within Czarnków-Trzcianka County, Greater Poland Voivodeship, in west-central Poland.
