= Baborówko =

- Village
- Location within Poland
- Coordinates: 52°35′N 16°38′E
- Country: Poland
- Voivodeship: Greater Poland
- County: Szamotuły
- Gmina: Szamotuły
- Population: 480

Baborówko [babɔˈrufkɔ] is a village in the administrative district of Gmina Szamotuły, within Szamotuły County, Greater Poland Voivodeship, in west-central Poland.
