= Wronki railway station =

Railway station in Wronki, Poland

Coordinates: 52.7053°N 16.3858°E

Wronki
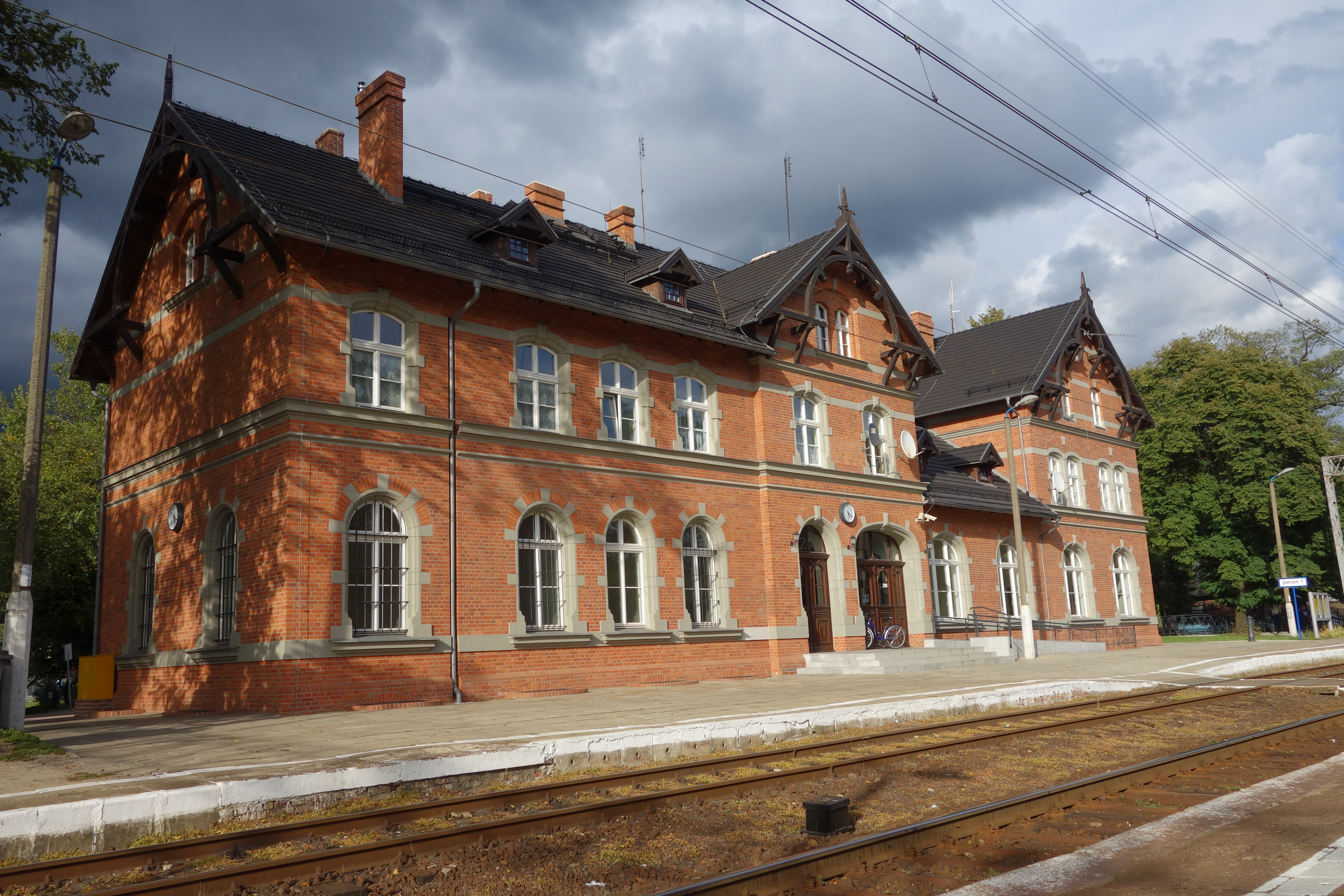
- Wronki railway station

General information
- Location: Wronki, Greater Poland Voivodeship; Poland
- System: Railway Station
- Operator: PKP; Polregio
- Lines: 351: Poznań–Szczecin railway 381: Oborniki Wielkopolskie–Wronki railway (closed)
- Platforms: 3
- Tracks: 4

History
- Opened: 1848; 178 years ago
- Rebuilt: 2012-2013

Services
Preceding station	Polregio	Following station
Mokrz towards Szczecin Główny	PR	Pęckowo towards Poznań Główny
Preceding station	KW	Following station
Pęckowo towards Poznań Główny	Poznań - Krzyż	Mokrz towards Krzyż
Preceding station	Poznań Metropolitan Railway	Following station
Terminus	PKM4	Pęckowo towards Środa Wielkopolska
Location
- Location within Poland

Wronki railway station is a stop on the Poznań–Szczecin railway in Poland. It serves the town of Wronki in the Greater Poland Voivodeship and opened in 1848. Train services using the station are operated by PKP and Polregio.

The station building dates from 1880 and has been a registered monument since 2002.

== Modernisation ==
In 2012 and 2013 2.6 million Złoty was spent on modernising the station and improving accessibility for less able people.

== Train services ==
Lines stopping at the station include:

- Intercity Swinoujscie - Szczecin - Stargard - Krzyz - Poznan - Kutno - Warsaw - Bialystok / Lublin - Rzeszow - Przemysl
- Intercity Swinoujscie - Szczecin - Stargard - Krzyz - Poznan - Leszno - Wroclaw - Opole - Katowice - Krakow - Rzeszow - Przemysl
- Intercity Szczecin - Stargard - Krzyz - Poznan - Kutno - Lowicz - Lodz - Krakow
- Intercity Gorzow Wielkopolskie - Krzyz - Poznan - Ostrow Wielkopolski - Lubliniec - Czestochowa - Krakow
- Regional service (R) Szczecin - Stargard - Dobiegniew - Krzyz - Wronki - Poznan
