= Krzyż railway station =

Railway station in Krzyż Wielkopolski, Poland

Coordinates: 52.8781°N 16.0219°E

Krzyż
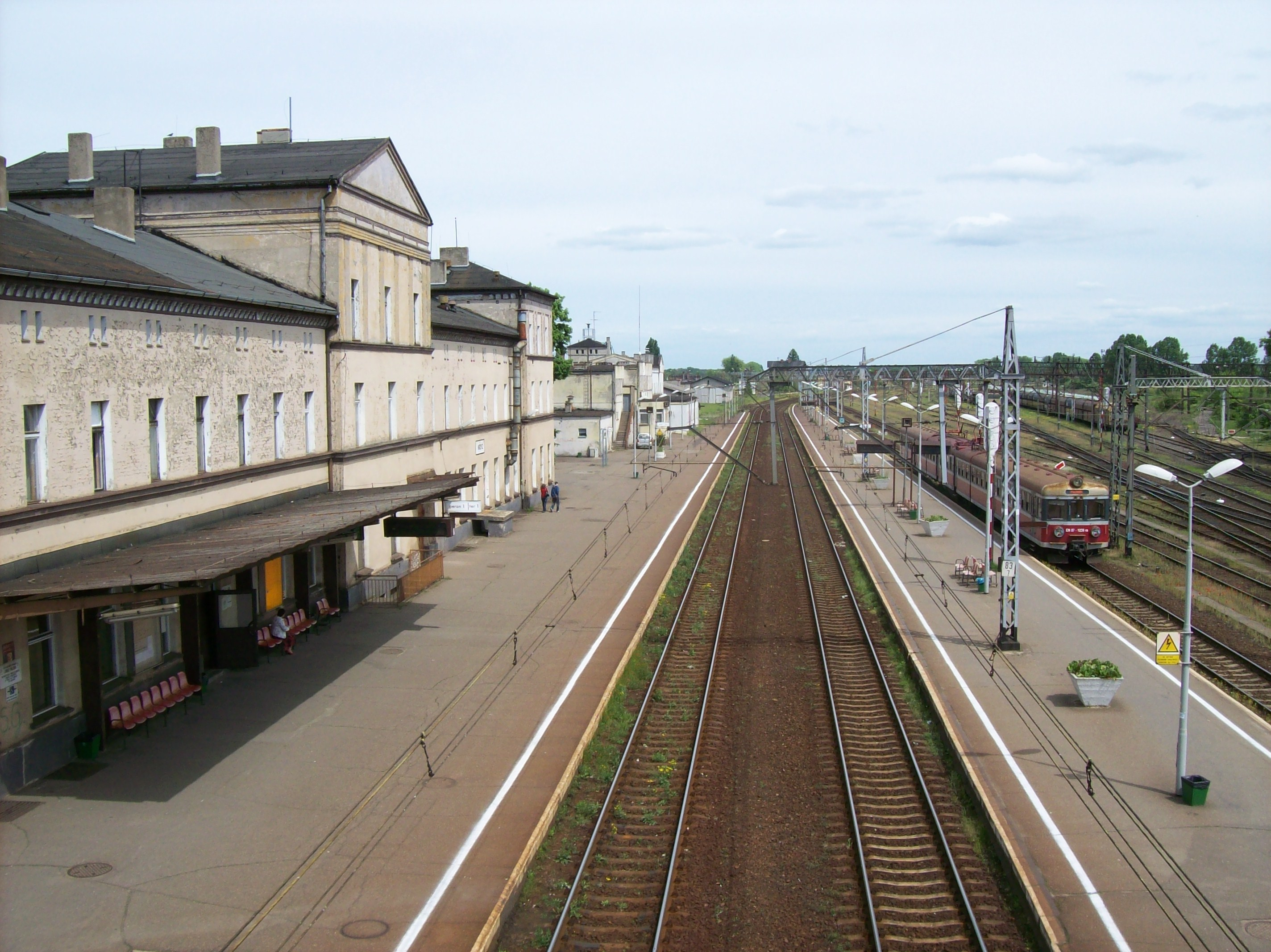
- Krzyż railway station

General information
- Location: Krzyż Wielkopolski, Greater Poland Voivodeship; Poland
- System: Railway Station
- Operator: PKP Polskie Linie Kolejowe
- Lines: 203: Tczew–Kostrzyn railway 351: Poznań–Szczecin railway 412: Wałcz–Krzyż railway (closed)
- Platforms: 6

History
- Opened: 1851; 175 years ago

Services
Preceding station	PKP Intercity	Following station
Choszczno towards Szczecin Główny	EIC	Poznań Główny towards Warszawa Wschodnia
Wieleń towards Gdynia Główna	TLK	Nowe Drezdenko towards Kostrzyn
Preceding station	Polregio	Following station
Drawiny towards Szczecin Główny	PR	Drawski Młyn towards Poznań Główny
Terminus	PR	Wieleń Północny towards Chojnice
Stare Bielice towards Kostrzyn	PR	Terminus
Preceding station	KW	Following station
Drawski Młyn towards Poznań Główny	Poznań - Krzyż	Terminus
Location
- Location within Poland

Krzyż railway station is a railway station serving the town of Krzyż Wielkopolski, in the Greater Poland Voivodeship, Poland. The station opened in 1851 and is located on the Tczew–Kostrzyn railway, Poznań–Szczecin railway and now closed Wałcz–Krzyż railway. The train services are operated by PKP, Polregio.

Despite Krzyż being a small town, its station has an important interchange function between the north–south route from Szczecin to Poznan and the east–west route from Germany and Gorzów Wielkopolski to Piła and further east.

The station building is located on the central platform and is connected to the town by a footbridge. At the station there is also a large depot of Polregio, including a working turntable and Roundhouse.

== Train services ==
The station is served by the following services:

- Express Intercity services (EIC) Szczecin — Warsaw
- Intercity services Swinoujscie - Szczecin - Stargard - Krzyz - Poznan - Kutno - Warsaw - Bialystok / Lublin - Rzeszow - Przemysl
- Intercity services Swinoujscie - Szczecin - Stargard - Krzyz - Poznan - Leszno - Wroclaw - Opole - Katowice - Krakow - Rzeszow - Przemysl
- Intercity services Szczecin - Stargard - Krzyz - Poznan - Kutno - Lowicz - Lodz - Krakow
- Intercity services Szczecin - Stargard - Krzyz - Pila - Bydgoszcz - Torun - Kutno - Lowicz - Warsaw - Lublin - Rzeszow - Przemysl
- Intercity services Gorzow Wielkopolski - Krzyz - Pila - Bydgoszcz - Torun - Kutno - Lowicz - Warsaw
- Intercity services Gorzow Wielkopolski - Krzyz - Poznan - Ostrow Wielkopolski - Lubliniec - Czestochowa - Krakow
- Intercity services (TLK) Gdynia Główna — Kostrzyn
- Regional services (R) Szczecin - Stargard - Dobiegniew - Krzyz - Wronki - Poznan
- Regional services (R) Kostrzyn - Gorzow Wielkopolski - Krzyz
- Regional services (R) Krzyz - Pila - Chojnice

== Preserved locomotive ==
Steam Engine Ol49-82 is plinthed at the station.

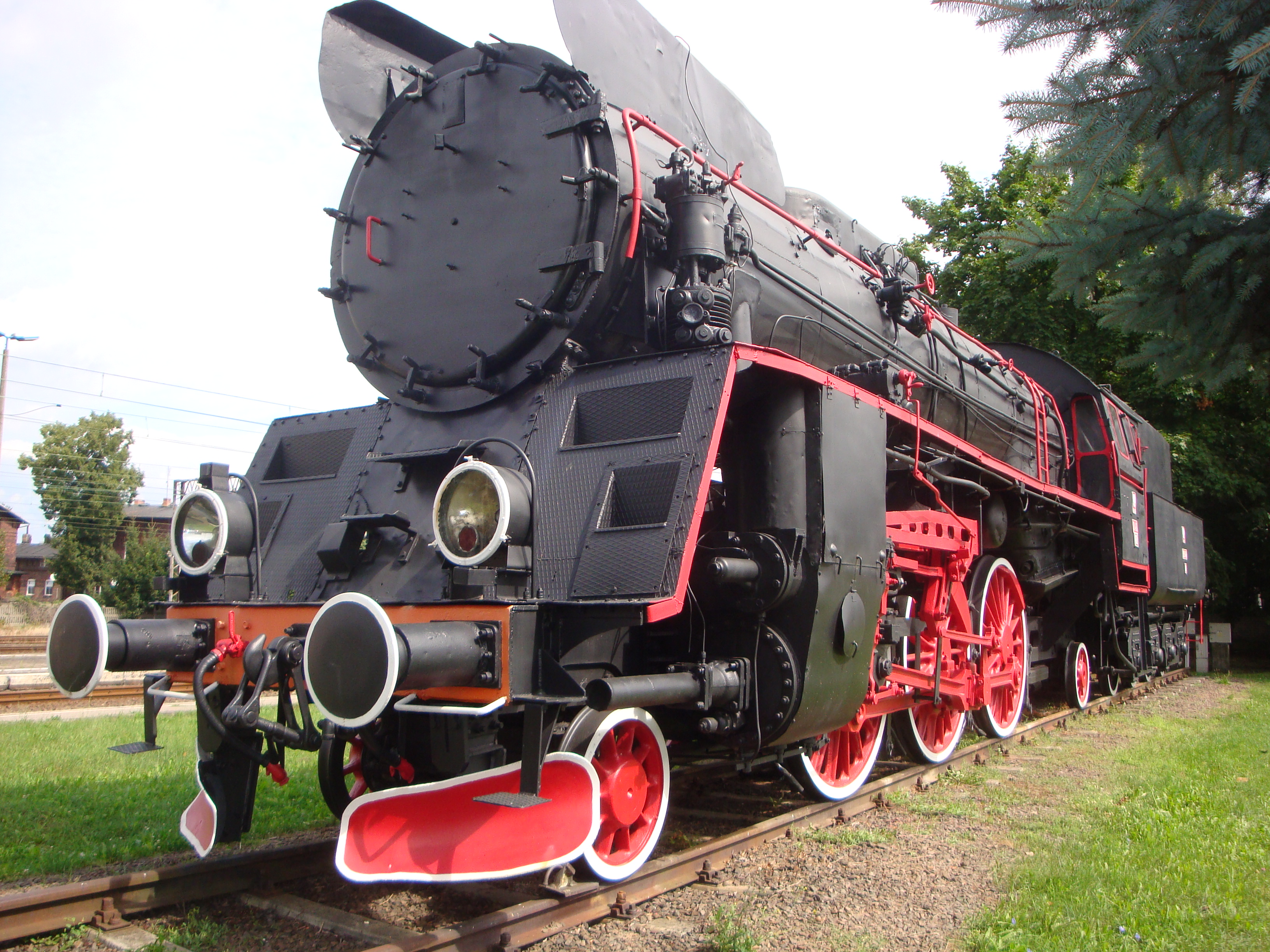
Ol49-82
