= Poznań–Szczecin railway =

Railway line in Poland

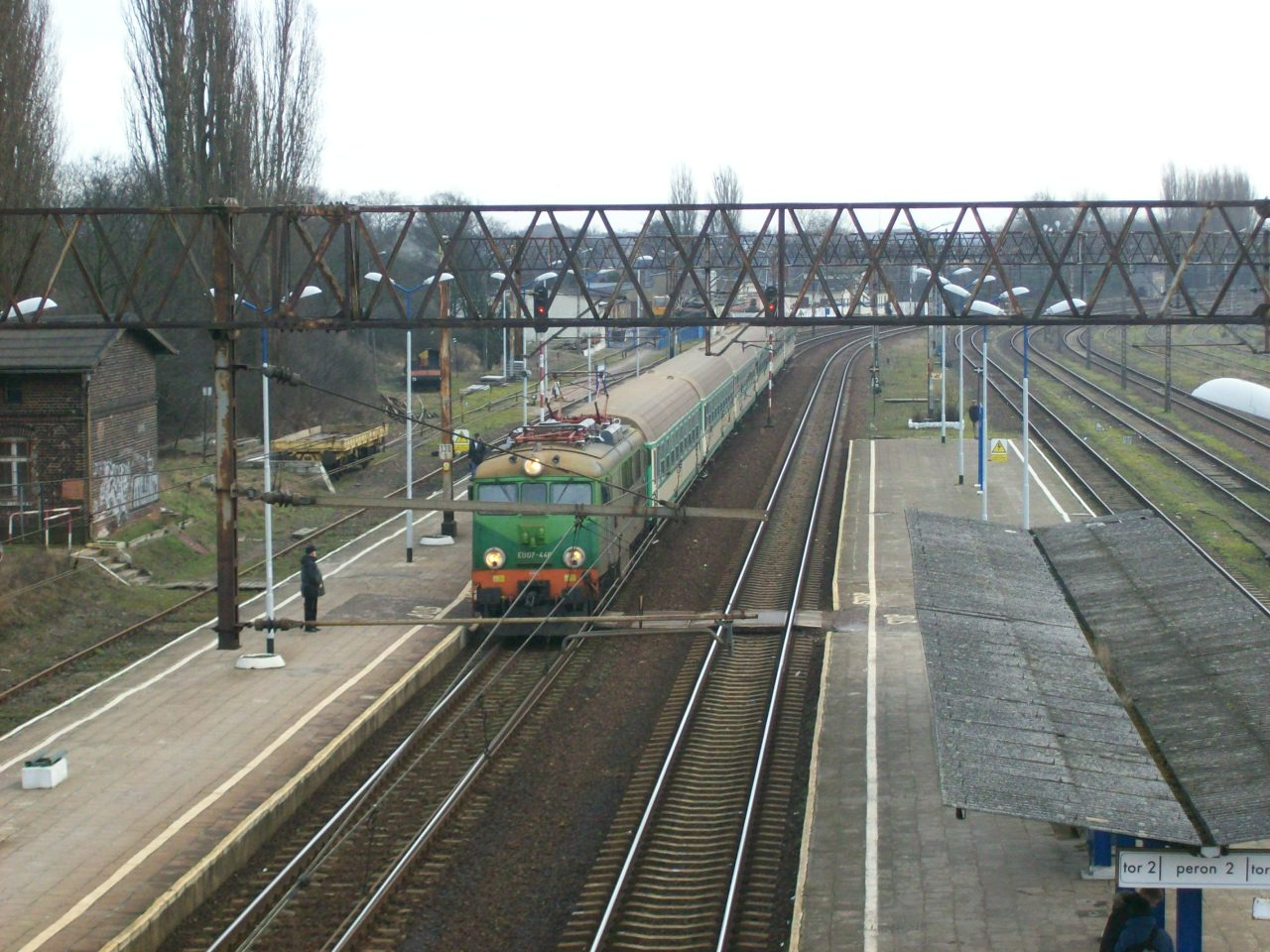
- Choszczno station platforms

Overview
- Status: in use
- Locale: Poland
- Termini: Poznań; Szczecin

Service
- Type: Heavy rail
- Route number: 351

Technical
- Line length: 213 km (132 mi)
- Track gauge: 1,435 mm (4 ft 8 1/2 in) standard gauge

The Poznań–Szczecin railway is a Polish 213-kilometre (132 mi) rail transport line that connects Poznań with Krzyż Wielkopolski, Stargard and further to Szczecin. The railway is part of European TEN-T route E59 from Scandinavia to Vienna, Budapest and Prague.

== See also ==
- Railway lines of Poland
