= Wolin railway station =

Railway station in Poland

Wolin
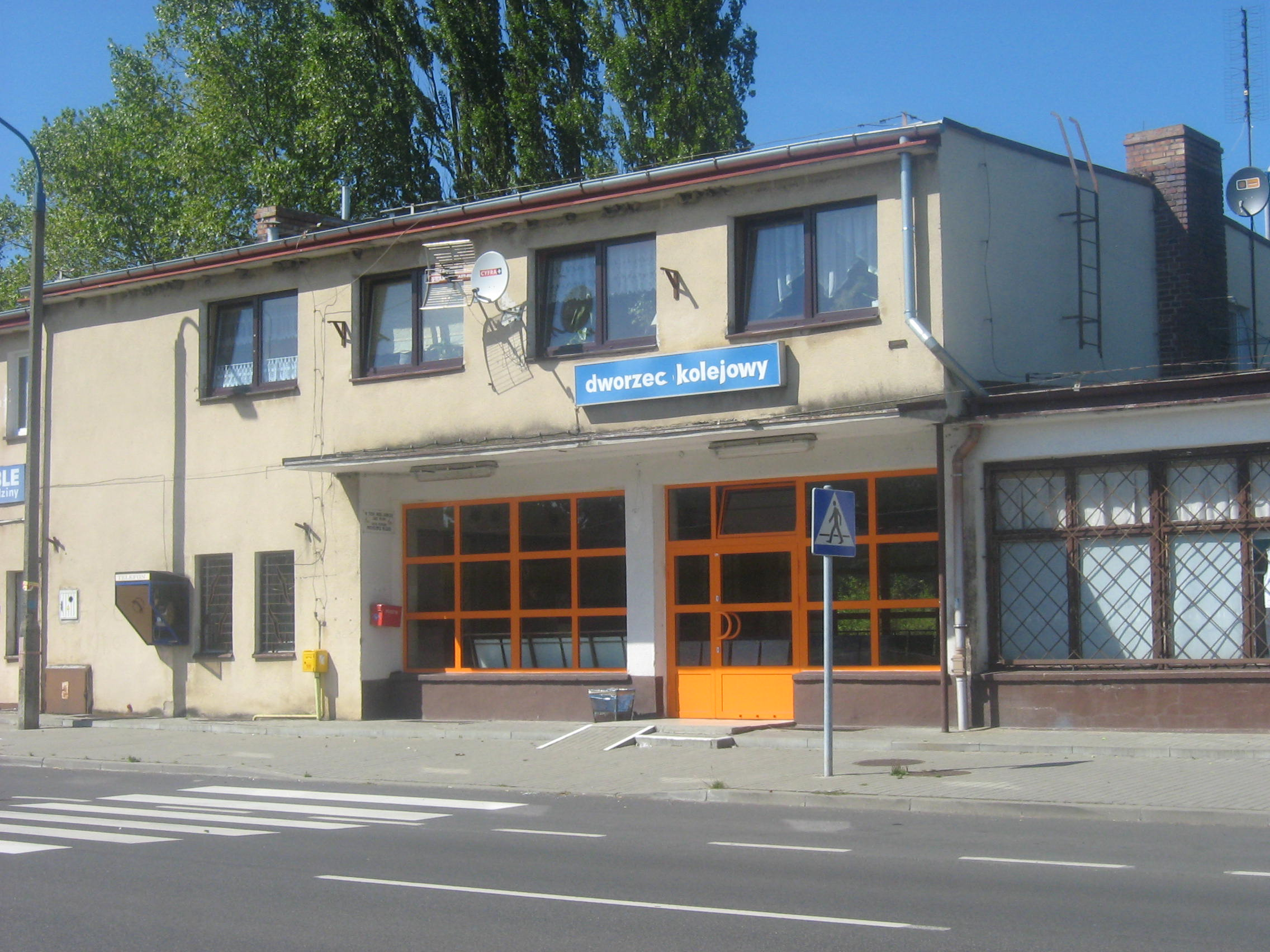
- Station building in 2008

General information
- Location: 6 Kolejowa Street, Wolin, West Pomeranian Voivodeship; Poland
- Owner: Polish State Railways
- Line: Szczecin–Świnoujście railway
- Platforms: 2

History
- Opened: 15 July 1892

Services
Preceding station	Polregio	Following station
Recław towards Szczecin Główny	PR	Mokrzyca Wielka towards Świnoujście Port
Location
- Location within Poland Location within West Pomeranian Voivodeship

Wolin is a railway station on the Szczecin–Świnoujście railway in the town of Wolin, Kamień County, in the West Pomeranian Voivodeship in northern Poland.

== Name ==
From 1892 to 1945, the station was known as Wollin, from 1945 to 1948, as Wołyń Pomorski, and from 1948 until 2018, as Wolin Pomorski. Since 2018, has been known as Wolin.

== History ==
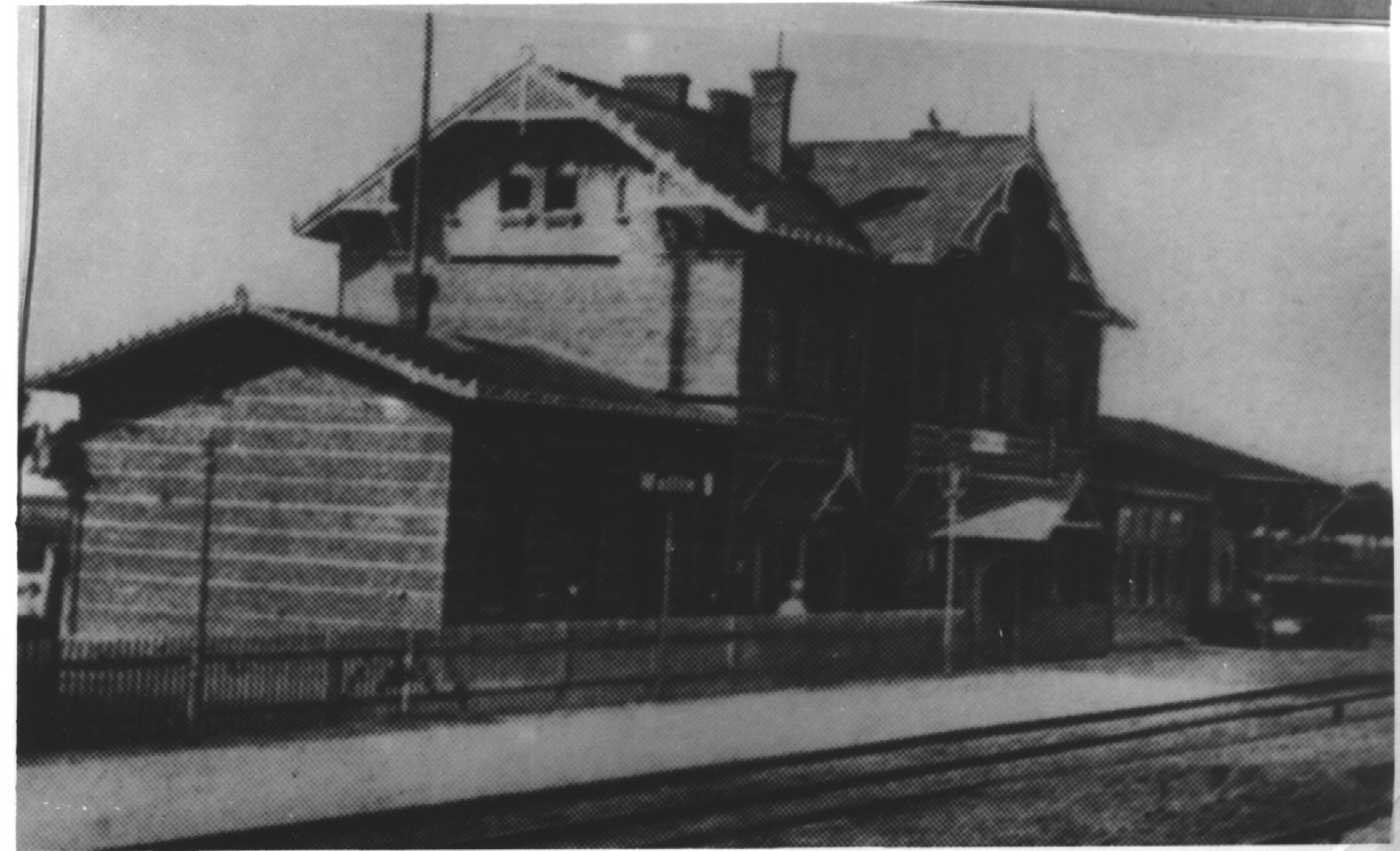
The station sometime before World War II

The station was opened by Prussian State Railways as Wollin on 15 July 1892. During World War II, the station building sustained severe damage. After World War II, the area came under Polish administration. As a result, the station was taken over by Polish State Railways and the station was downgraded to a railway halt.

== Train services ==
The station is served by the following services:

- Regional services (PR) Szczecin Główny - Goleniów - Świnoujście Port
