= Danzig Hohetor Bahnhof =

Defunct railway station in Gdańsk

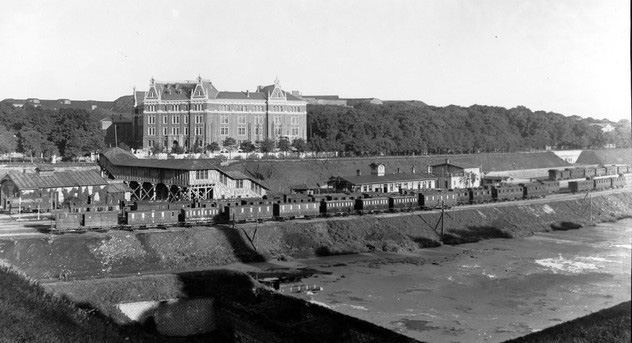
- The station building and city moat around 1890

General information
- Location: Stadtmitte, Danzig; Poland (German Empire)
- Coordinates: 54.3572°N 18.6444°E
- System: Railway station

History
- Opened: 1 October 1867
- Closed: 30 September 1896
Location

Danzig Hohetor Bahnhof (Polish: Dworzec Brama Wyżynna) was the second railway station to ever be built in Gdańsk, opened in 1867. It was closed in 1896 to make room for the new central station, Danzig Hauptbahnhof (today known as Gdańsk Główny), opened in 1900.

== History ==
The first railway arrived in Danzig (as Gdańsk was them known) in 1852, with the creation of the Danzig Leeges Tor station, connecting Danzig with Dirschau. In 1865, construction work began on a new railway line from the south of the city to Neufahrwasser. Along this line, the new Danzig Hohetor Bahnhof was built, with the first train arriving on 1 October 1867. Its name came from the nearby Brama Wyżynna.

In 1870, another railway line, leading to the city of Stargard, was linked to Danzg Hohetor Bf, resulting in it being thenceforth informally called the "Pomeranian Station" (Polish: Dworzec Pomorski). In 1876, a pedestrian bridge was constructed, linking the station's platforms to the nearby streets. It was nicknamed the "Elephant's Tusk" on account of its shape. In 1880, the Prussian Eastern Railway began serving both the lines to Dirschau and Stargard.

After the nearby city moat was removed, in 1892, a new station building was planned. In 1894, construction started; the new terminus was completed on 1900, but Danzig Leeges Tor was closed on 1 October 1896 to allow for work to progress, with a temporary station being used for the four years in between. The construction of the new terminus, Danzig Hbf, cost 5 million marks.
