= Choszczno railway station =

Railway station in Choszczno, Poland

Coordinates: 53.1655°N 15.4035°E

Choszczno
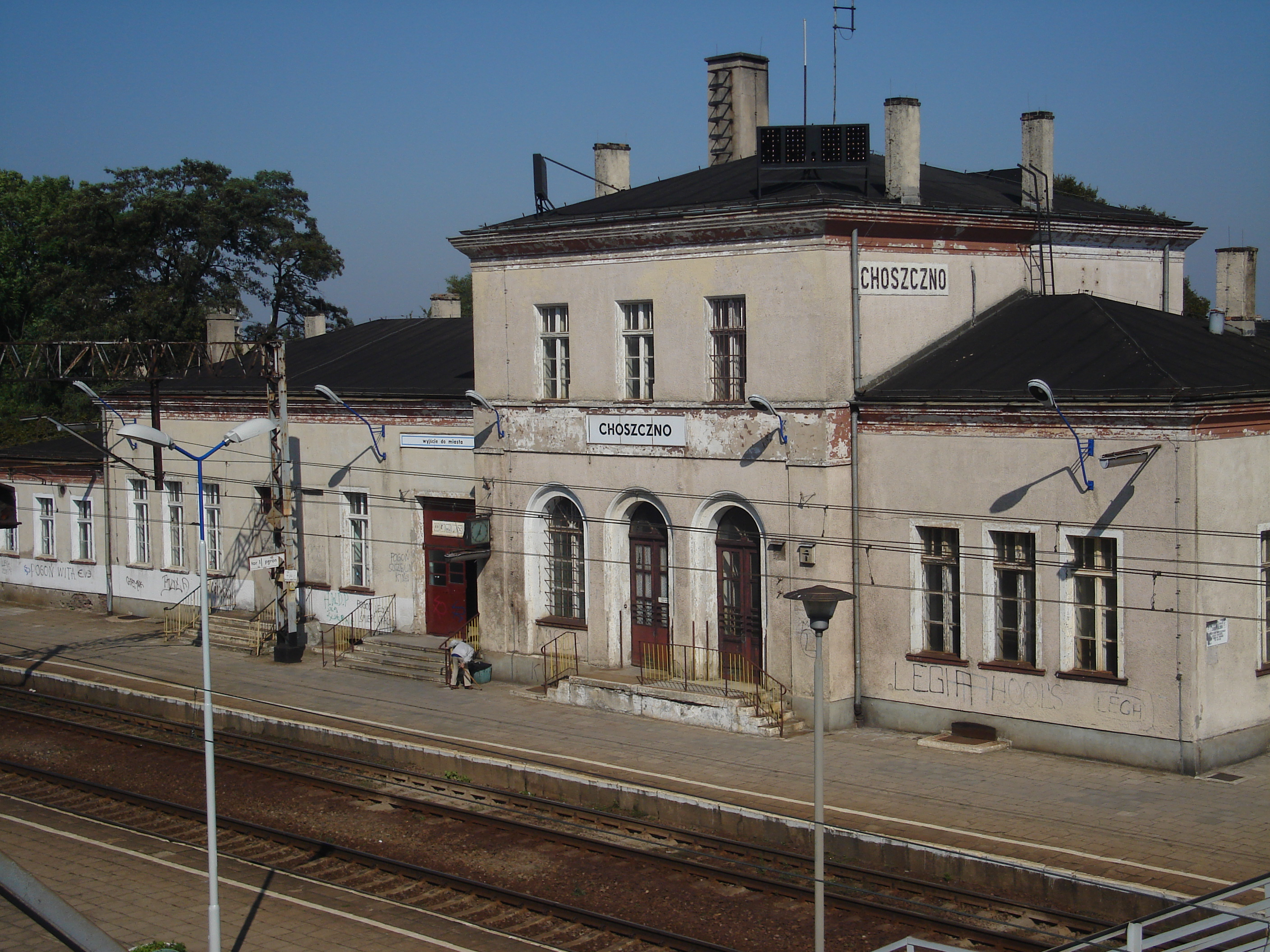
- Choszczno railway station

General information
- Location: Choszczno, West Pomeranian Voivodeship; Poland
- System: Railway Station
- Operator: PKP Polskie Linie Kolejowe
- Lines: 351: Poznań–Szczecin railway 410: Grzmiąca–Kostrzyn railway (closed)
- Platforms: 4
- Tracks: 6

Services
Preceding station	PKP Intercity	Following station
Stargard towards Szczecin Główny	EIC	Krzyż towards Warszawa Wschodnia
Preceding station	Polregio	Following station
Ziemomyśl towards Świnoujście	PR	Stary Klukom towards Poznań Główny
Location
- Location within Poland

Choszczno railway station is a railway station serving the town of Choszczno, in the West Pomeranian Voivodeship, Poland. The station is located on the Poznań–Szczecin railway and the now closed Grzmiąca–Kostrzyn railway. The train services are operated by PKP and Polregio.

The station was known as Arnswalde until 1945.

== Train services ==
The station is served by the following services:

- Express Intercity services (EIC) Szczecin — Warsaw
- Intercity services Swinoujscie - Szczecin - Stargard - Krzyz - Poznan - Kutno - Warsaw - Bialystok / Lublin - Rzeszow - Przemysl
- Intercity services Swinoujscie - Szczecin - Stargard - Krzyz - Poznan - Leszno - Wroclaw - Opole - Katowice - Krakow - Rzeszow - Przemysl
- Intercity services Szczecin - Stargard - Krzyz - Poznan - Kutno - Lowicz - Lodz - Krakow
- Intercity services Szczecin - Stargard - Krzyz - Pila - Bydgoszcz - Torun - Kutno - Lowicz - Warsaw - Lublin - Rzeszow - Przemysl
- Regional services (R) Swinoujscie - Szczecin - Stargard - Dobiegniew - Krzyz - Wronki - Poznan
