= Stargard railway station =

Railway station in Stargard, Poland

Coordinates: 53.3397°N 15.0314°E

Stargard
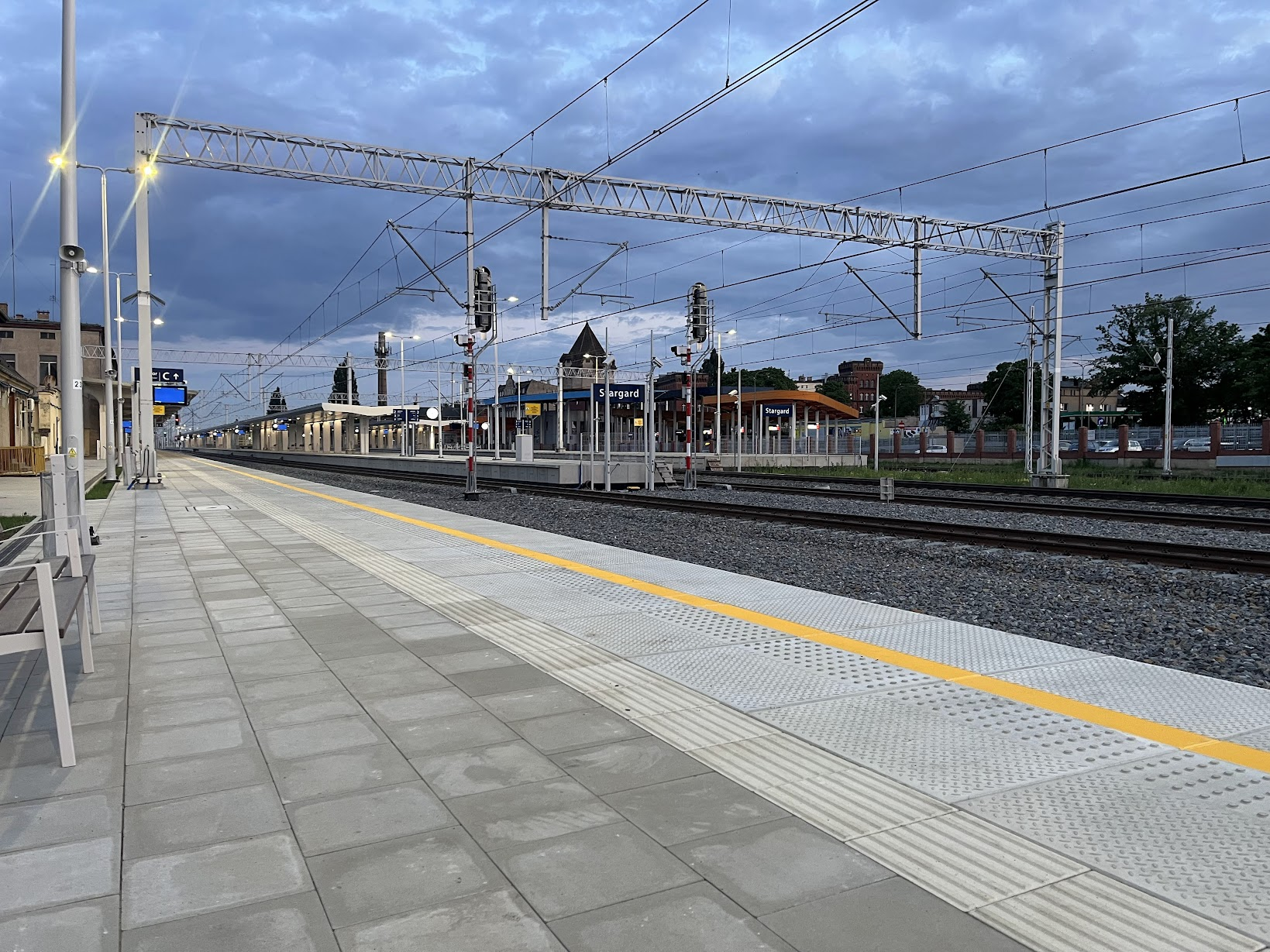
- Stargard railway station after modernization (2025)

General information
- Location: Stargard, West Pomeranian Voivodeship; Poland
- System: Railway Station
- Operator: PKP Polskie Linie Kolejowe
- Lines: 202: Gdańsk–Stargard railway 351: Poznań–Szczecin railway 411: Stargard–Godków railway
- Platforms: 3
- Tracks: 6

Construction
- Structure type: At-grade
- Parking: Park & Ride car park nearby (Barnima Street).
- Accessible: Yes

History
- Opened: May 1, 1846; 180 years ago

Passengers
- 2024: 2 000 000
Location
- Location within Poland

Stargard railway station is a railway station serving the town of Stargard, in the West Pomeranian Voivodeship, Poland. The station is located on the Poznań–Szczecin railway, Gdańsk–Stargard railway and Stargard–Godków railway. The train services are operated by PKP and Polregio.

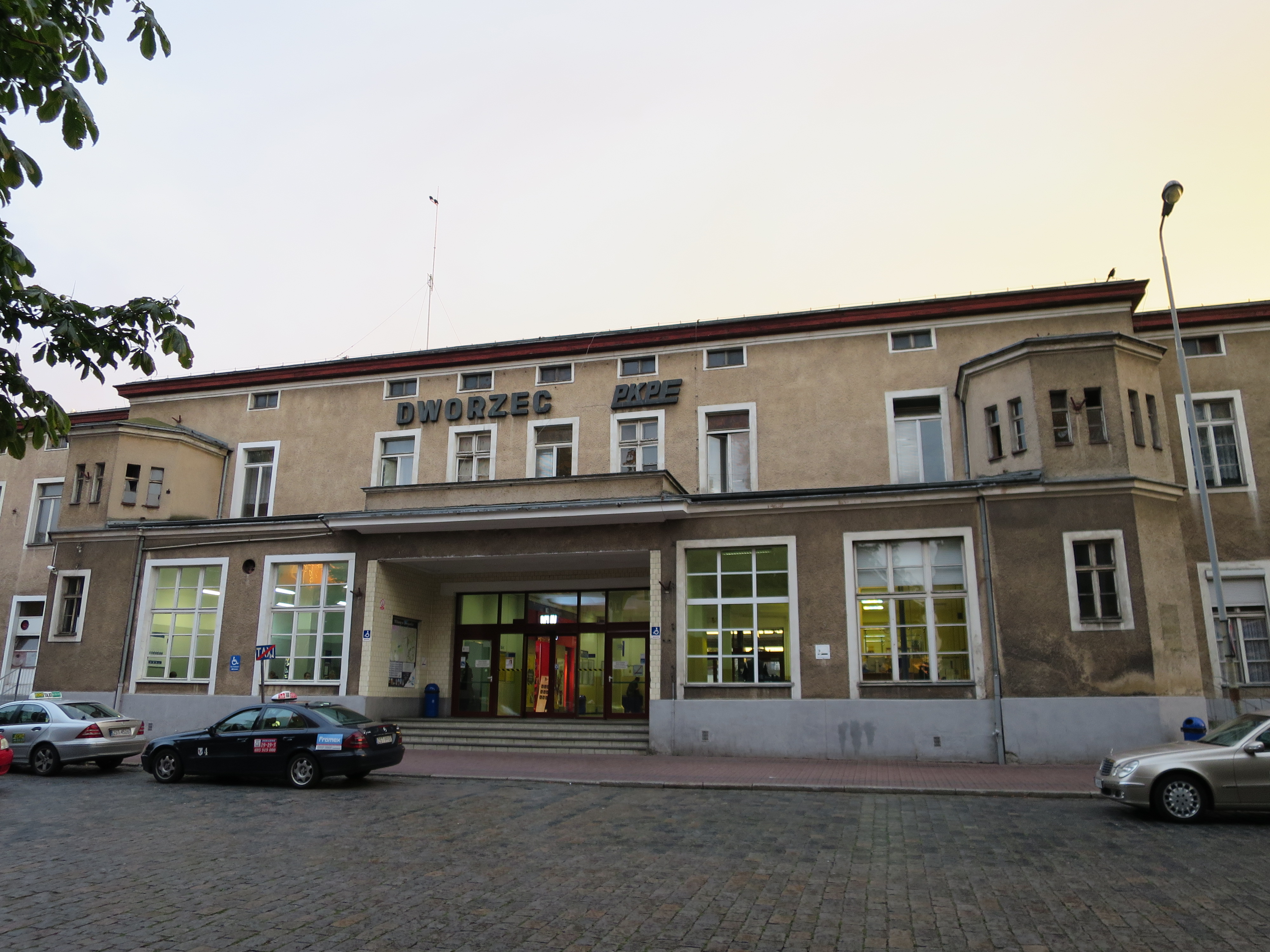
Entrance to the station

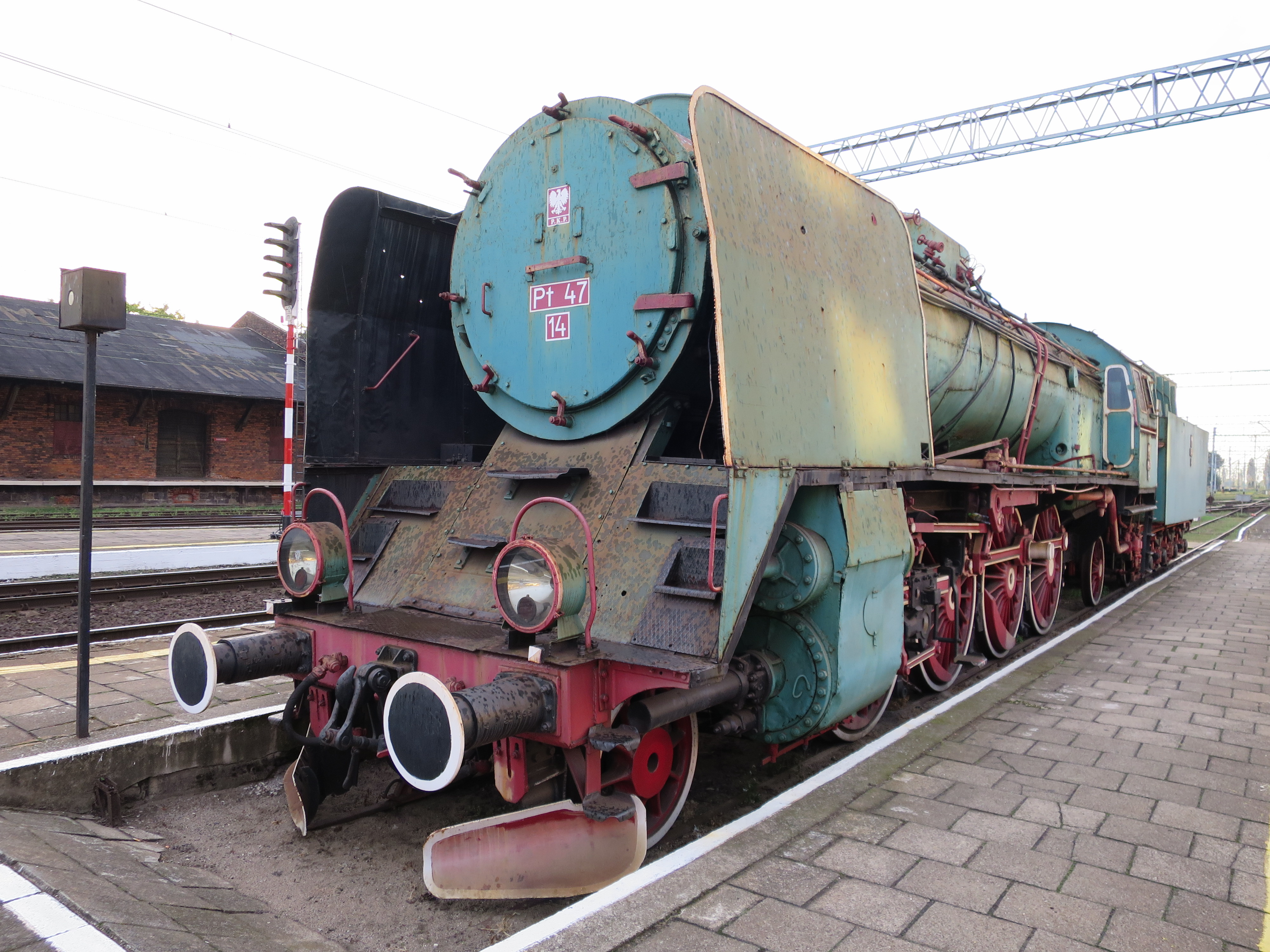
Pt47-17

The first train pulled by a steam locomotive from Szczecin pulled into the station on May 1, 1846. In 1848, the line towards Poznan opened and from 1856 to 1859 a connection was made to Koszalin. At the end of the nineteenth century, connections to Pila and to Kostrzyn were built.

The station was known as Stargard (Pommern) until 1945. Until 2015, the town was known as Stargard Szczeciński, the name of the station didn't change until June 2016.

From 2019 to 2025, the nearby railway tracks and platforms were modernized to meet new PKP standards. After the completion of the modernization in 2025, several improvements were opened for public use, including a renovated tunnel connecting all platforms with each other and with exits leading towards the city center via Wyszyńskiego Street, as well as towards the Integrated Transport Hub (ZCP) and Szczecińska Street. The station also features new electronic display boards showing real-time train schedules and elevators linking the tunnel with the platforms.

Since January 24, 2023, a 24-hour Park & Ride parking facility has been available near the railway station, with direct access from Platform 1.

== Train services ==
The station is served by the following services:

- Express Intercity services (EIC) Szczecin — Warsaw
- Intercity services Swinoujscie – Szczecin – Stargard – Krzyz – Poznan – Kutno – Warsaw – Bialystok / Lublin – Rzeszow – Przemysl
- Intercity services Swinoujscie – Szczecin – Stargard – Krzyz – Poznan – Leszno – Wroclaw – Opole – Katowice – Krakow – Rzeszow – Przemysl
- Intercity services Szczecin – Stargard – Krzyz – Poznan – Kutno – Lowicz – Lodz – Krakow
- Intercity services Szczecin – Stargard – Krzyz – Pila – Bydgoszcz – Torun – Kutno – Lowicz – Warsaw – Lublin – Rzeszow – Przemysl
- Intercity services Szczecin – Stargard – Kalisz Pomorski – Pila – Bydgoszcz
- Intercity services Szczecin – Stargard – Bialogard – Koszalin – Slupsk – Lębork – Gdynia – Gdansk – Malbork – Elblag – Olsztyn – Elk – Bialystok
- Regional services (R) Swinoujscie – Szczecin – Stargard – Dobiegniew – Krzyz – Wronki – Poznan
- Regional services (R) Szczecin – Stargard – Bialogard – Koszalin – Slupsk
- Regional services (R) Szczecin – Stargard – Kalisz Pomorski – Pila

| Preceding station | PKP Intercity | Following station |
|---|---|---|
| Szczecin Dabie towards Szczecin Główny | EIC | Choszczno towards Warszawa Wschodnia |
| Preceding station | Polregio | Following station |
| Grzędzice Stargardzkie towards Świnoujście | PR | Witkowo Pyrzyckie towards Poznań Główny |
| Grzędzice Stargardzkie towards Szczecin Główny | PR | Ulikowo towards Słupsk |
| Grzędzice Stargardzkie towards Szczecin Główny | PR | Ulikowo towards Piła Główna |
