= Gdańsk Główny railway station =

Railway station in Gdańsk, Poland

Gdańsk Główny
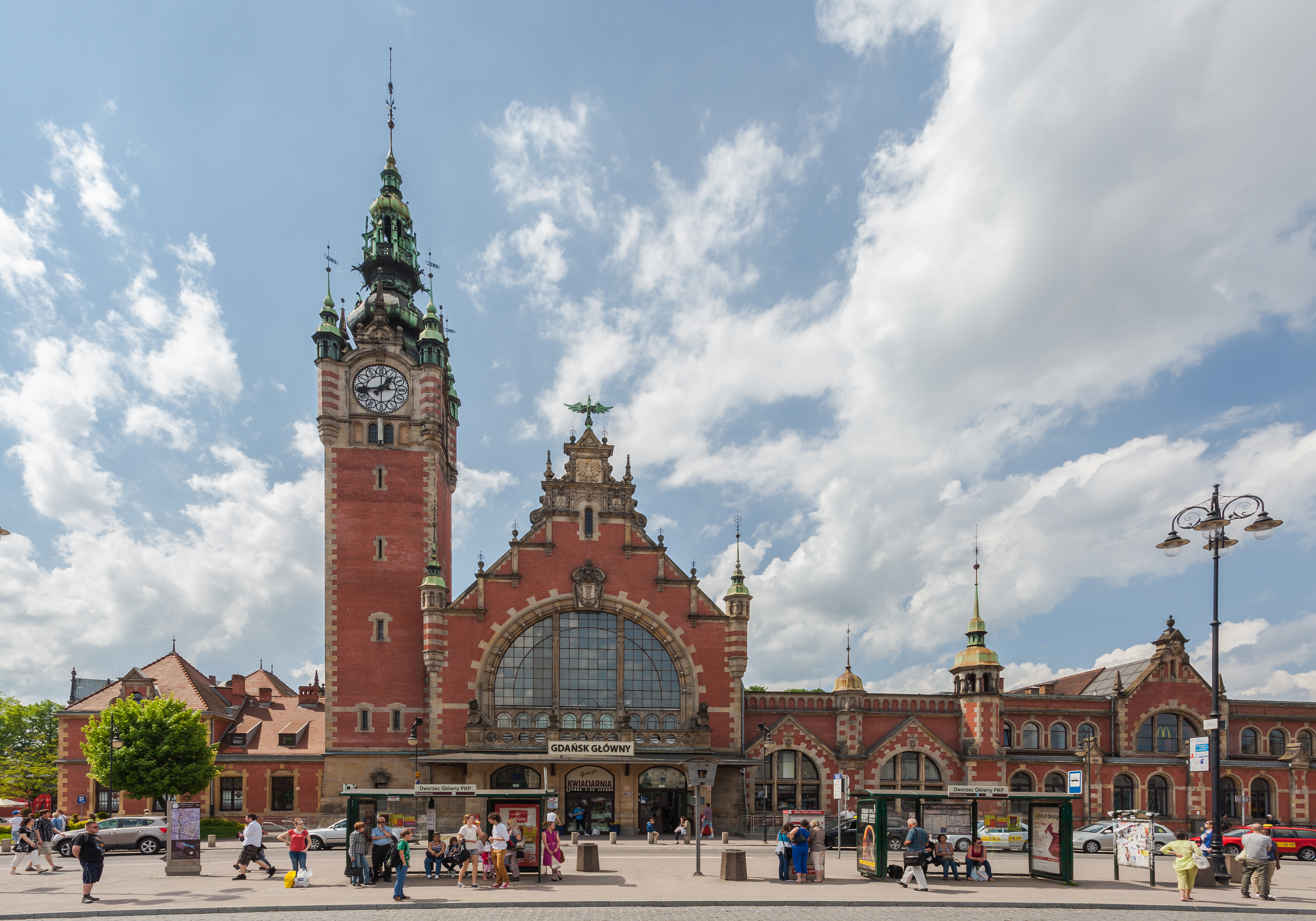
- Gdańsk Główny railway station (2013)

General information
- Location: Gdańsk, Pomeranian Voivodeship; Poland
- System: Railway station
- Operator: PKP Polskie Linie Kolejowe; SKM Tricity
- Lines: 9: Warsaw–Gdańsk railway 202: Gdańsk–Stargard railway 227 Gdańsk Główny–Gdańsk Zaspa Towarowa railway 249: Gdańsk Główny–Gdańsk Nowy Port railway 250: Gdańsk Śródmieście–Rumia railway
- Platforms: 10
- Tracks: 10

Construction
- Accessible: yes

Other information
- Classification: A

History
- Opened: 30 October 1900; 125 years ago
- Rebuilt: 2023
Location
- Location within Poland

Gdańsk Główny (lit. 'Gdańsk main') is the chief railway station serving the city of Gdańsk, in the Pomeranian Voivodeship, Poland. The station opened in 1900 and is located on the Warsaw–Gdańsk railway, Gdańsk–Stargard railway, the parallel Gdańsk Śródmieście–Rumia railway, Gdańsk Główny–Gdańsk Zaspa Towarowa railway and Gdańsk Główny–Gdańsk Nowy Port railway. The train services are operated by PKP, Polregio and SKM Tricity. Masovian Railways trains operate here during the summer. The station features five island platforms. The building was restored after being set on fire in 1945 during World War II.

== History ==
The first railway line in Gdańsk opened in 1852, terminating at Danzig Leeges Tor station. In 1867, on the site of where the Gdańsk Główny station is found today, Danzig Hohetor Bahnhof was built. Access to it was only from the west, from the so-called. "Promenade" (ul. 3 Maja). To the east of the station the city separated because of the modern fortifications and moat of Gdańsk. The station could begin to expand after filling up the old moat and demolishing the western bastions.

The existing station was built between 1894 and 1900, with the official opening on 30 October 1900.

In 1945 the station was set on fire and was restored after World War II. The tower escaped the fire.

On 2 January 1952 the SKM Trojmiasto suburban railway was opened, parallel to the existing line between Gdańsk and Gdynia.

The station features five island platforms, of which three function for the regional commuter SKM services and the other two for long-distance services and regional services. Access to the platforms is via subways from the east and west sides of the city. On the east side, the subway ends on the other side of Podwale Grodzkie street, and on the west side, it goes directly into the PKS (long-distance bus) station. Connecting tunnels enable access to the station building and tram stops, and contain shops, fast food bars, newsagents, and other kiosks.

== Station building ==
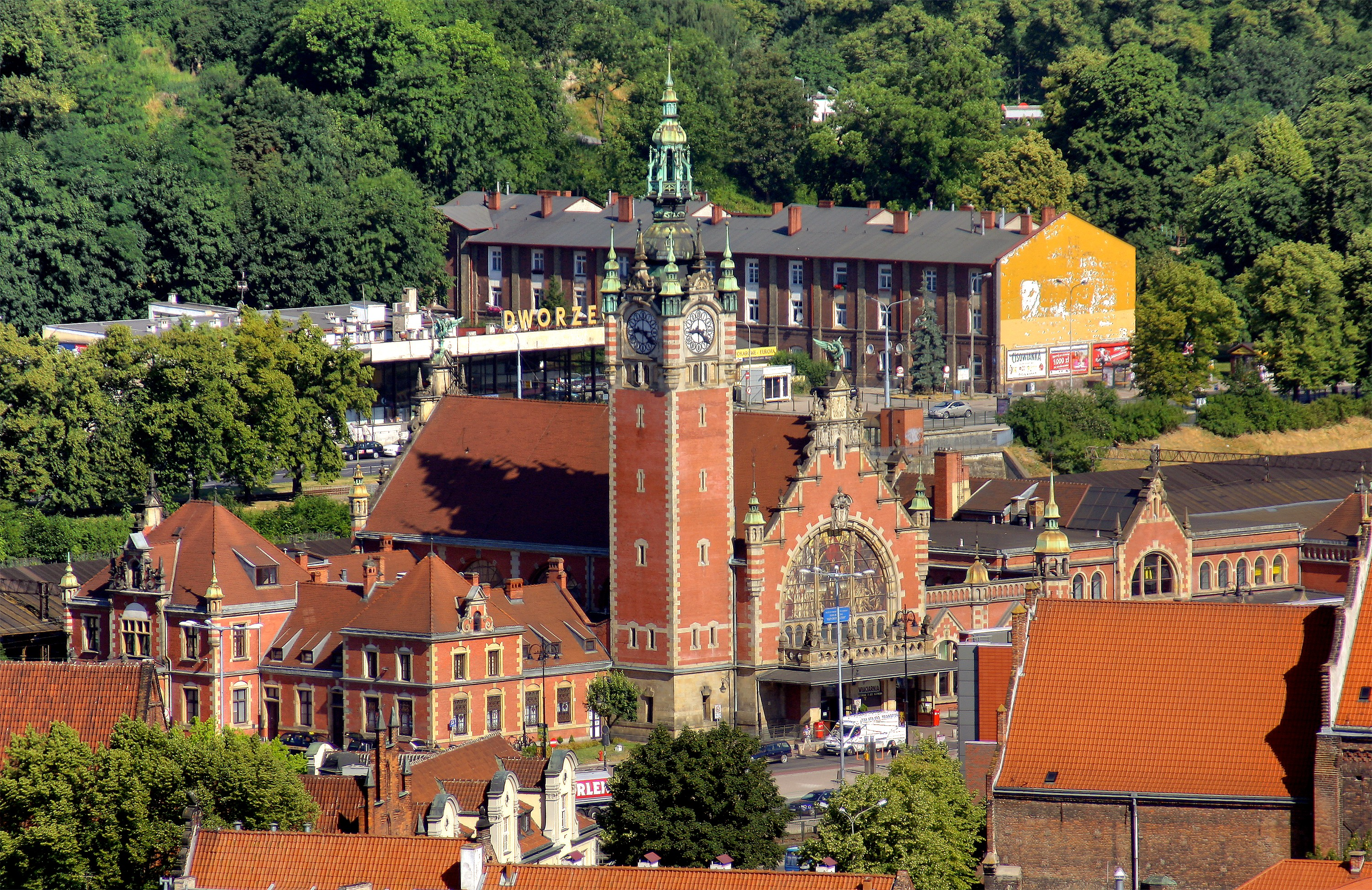
Gdańsk Główny Aerial view

On the station there are many small gastronomic locales and cafes, as well as McDonald's and KFC restaurants. Ticket offices are open from 5:30am to 8:15pm, and the station sells international as well as domestic tickets. Apart from that, there is a railway information point (InfoDworzec), two luggage storage points, WC with showers, a post office, and a pharmacy.

The basic design of the building with a tall tower abutting a main hall with a sloped roof was widely replicated across the railway network of what was then the German Empire in the immediately following years, and was even exported to neighboring Luxembourg. Stations following this archetype include the main stations of Colmar, Krefeld, Bad Homburg, Wiesbaden, Luxembourg City, Stralsund, and Metz. It also served as the template for a 1984 wedding palace in Imari, Japan.

== Modernisation ==
In the early 1990s, during the general overhaul of the train station, a two-level hall was built for shops. This did not prove popular and was demolished in 2013.

Modernisation work took place in early 2017. The work aimed to remove changes made to the northern part of the building, replace windows and doors, update the passenger information system, security systems, introduce escalators, renewed lifts and an extension of the tunnel located to the east of the station. The project also included the restoration and reintroduction of the details that had been lost or damaged as a result of World War II. In 2023, the reconstruction of the railway station was completed and cost a total of PLN 120 million.

In terms of the reconstruction of the railway infrastructure, PKP PLK plans to overhaul long-distance platforms 1 and 2 and the tunnels, replace lighting (preserving their historical shapes) and installation of passenger information systems, elevators and escalators.

== Train services ==
The station is served by the following services:

- EuroCity services (EC) (EC 95 by DB) (IC by PKP) Gdynia - Gdansk - Bydgoszcz - Poznan - Rzepin - Frankfurt (Oder) - Berlin
- EuroCity services (EC) Gdynia - Gdansk - Malbork - Warsaw - Katowice - Bohumin - Ostrava - Prerov - Breclav - Vienna
- Express Intercity Premium services (EIP) Gdynia - Warsaw
- Express Intercity Premium services (EIP) Gdynia - Warsaw - Katowice - Gliwice/Bielsko-Biała
- Express Intercity Premium services (EIP) Gdynia/Kołobrzeg - Warsaw - Kraków (- Rzeszów)
- Intercity services (IC) Gdynia - Gdansk - Bydgoszcz - Poznań - Wrocław - Opole - Katowice - Kraków - Rzeszów - Przemyśl
- Intercity services (IC) Gdynia - Gdańsk - Bydgoszcz - Toruń - Kutno - Łódź - Częstochowa - Katowice - Bielsko-Biała
- Intercity services (IC) Gdynia - Gdańsk - Bydgoszcz - Łódź - Czestochowa — Kraków — Zakopane
- Intercity services (IC) Gdynia - Gdańsk - Bydgoszcz - Poznań - Zielona Góra
- Intercity services (IC) Gdynia - Gdańsk - Bydgoszcz - Poznań - Wrocław
- Intercity services (IC) Łódź Fabryczna — Warsaw — Gdańsk Glowny — Kołobrzeg
- Intercity services (IC) Szczecin - Koszalin - Słupsk - Gdynia - Gdańsk
- Intercity services (IC) Szczecin - Koszalin - Słupsk - Gdynia - Gdańsk - Elbląg/Iława - Olsztyn
- Intercity services (IC) Szczecin - Koszalin - Słupsk - Gdynia - Gdańsk - Elbląg - Olsztyn - Białystok
- Intercity services (TLK) Gdynia Główna — Kostrzyn
- Intercity services (TLK) Gdynia Główna — Warsaw — Kraków — Zakopane
- Intercity services (TLK) Kołobrzeg — Gdynia Główna — Warszawa Wschodnia — Kraków Główny
- Regional services (R) Tczew — Gdynia Chylonia
- Regional services (R) Tczew — Słupsk
- Regional services (R) Malbork — Słupsk
- Regional services (R) Malbork — Gdynia Chylonia
- Regional services (R) Elbląg — Gdynia Chylonia
- Regional services (R) Elbląg — Słupsk
- Regional services (R) Chojnice — Tczew — Gdynia Główna
- Regional services (R) Gdynia Chylonia — Olsztyn Główny
- Regional services (R) Gdynia Chylonia — Smętowo
- Regional services (R) Gdynia Chylonia — Laskowice Pomorskie
- Regional services (R) Gdynia Chylonia — Bydgoszcz Główna
- Regional services (R) Słupsk — Bydgoszcz Główna
- Regional services (R) Gdynia Chylonia — Pruszcz Gdański
- Pomorska Kolej Metropolitalna services (R) Kartuzy — Gdańsk Port Lotniczy (Airport) — Gdańsk Główny
- Szybka Kolej Miejska w Trójmieście services (SKM) (Lębork -) Wejherowo - Reda - Rumia - Gdynia - Sopot - Gdansk

| Preceding station | PKP Intercity | Following station |
|---|---|---|
| Gdańsk Wrzeszcz towards Gdynia Główna | EuroCity EC 95; IC | Tczew towards Berlin Hbf |
| Gdańsk Wrzeszcz towards Gdynia Główna | EuroCity IC | Tczew towards Wien Hbf |
| Gdańsk Wrzeszcz towards Gdynia Główna | EIP | Tczew towards Warszawa Centralna |
| Gdańsk Wrzeszcz towards Gdynia Główna | EIP | Tczew towards Gliwice or Bielsko-Biała Główna |
| Gdańsk Wrzeszcz towards Gdynia Główna or Kołobrzeg | EIP | Tczew towards Kraków Główny or Rzeszów Główny |
| Gdańsk Wrzeszcz towards Gdynia Główna | IC | Tczew towards Przemyśl Główny |
| Gdańsk Wrzeszcz towards Gdynia Główna | IC | Pruszcz Gdański towards Bielsko-Biała Główna |
| Gdańsk Wrzeszcz towards Gdynia Główna | IC (Via Bydgoszcz, Łódź) | Pruszcz Gdański towards Zakopane |
| Gdańsk Wrzeszcz towards Gdynia Główna | IC | Pruszcz Gdański towards Zielona Góra Główna |
| Gdańsk Wrzeszcz towards Gdynia Główna | IC | Tczew towards Wrocław Główny |
| Gdańsk Wrzeszcz towards Kołobrzeg | IC | Tczew towards Łódź Fabryczna |
| Gdańsk Wrzeszcz towards Szczecin Główny | IC | Terminus |
| Gdańsk Wrzeszcz towards Szczecin Główny | IC | Tczew towards Olsztyn Główny |
| Gdańsk Wrzeszcz towards Szczecin Główny | IC | Tczew towards Białystok |
| Gdańsk Wrzeszcz towards Gdynia Główna | TLK | Tczew towards Kostrzyn |
| Gdańsk Wrzeszcz towards Gdynia Główna | TLK (Via Warsaw) | Tczew towards Zakopane |
| Gdańsk Wrzeszcz towards Kołobrzeg | TLK | Tczew towards Kraków Główny |
| Preceding station | Polregio | Following station |
| Gdańsk Wrzeszcz towards Gdynia Główna, Gdynia Chylonia or Słupsk | PR | Gdańsk Orunia towards Tczew |
| Gdańsk Wrzeszcz towards Gdynia Główna, Gdynia Chylonia or Słupsk | PR | Gdańsk Orunia towards Malbork |
| Gdańsk Wrzeszcz towards Gdynia Główna, Gdynia Chylonia or Słupsk | PR | Gdańsk Orunia towards Elbląg |
| Gdańsk Wrzeszcz towards Gdynia Główna | PR | Gdańsk Orunia towards Chojnice |
| Gdańsk Wrzeszcz towards Gdynia Chylonia | PR | Gdańsk Orunia towards Olsztyn Główny |
| Gdańsk Wrzeszcz towards Gdynia Główna, Gdynia Chylonia or Słupsk | PR | Gdańsk Orunia towards Smętowo, Laskowice Pomorskie, or Bydgoszcz Główna |
| Gdańsk Wrzeszcz towards Gdynia Chylonia | PR | Gdańsk Orunia towards Pruszcz Gdański |
| Terminus | PR (Via Gdańsk Port Lotniczy (Airport)) | Gdańsk Wrzeszcz towards Kartuzy |
| Preceding station | SKM Tricity | Following station |
| Gdańsk Stocznia towards Wejherowo or Lębork | SKM Tricity | Gdańsk Śródmieście Terminus |

== Gallery ==
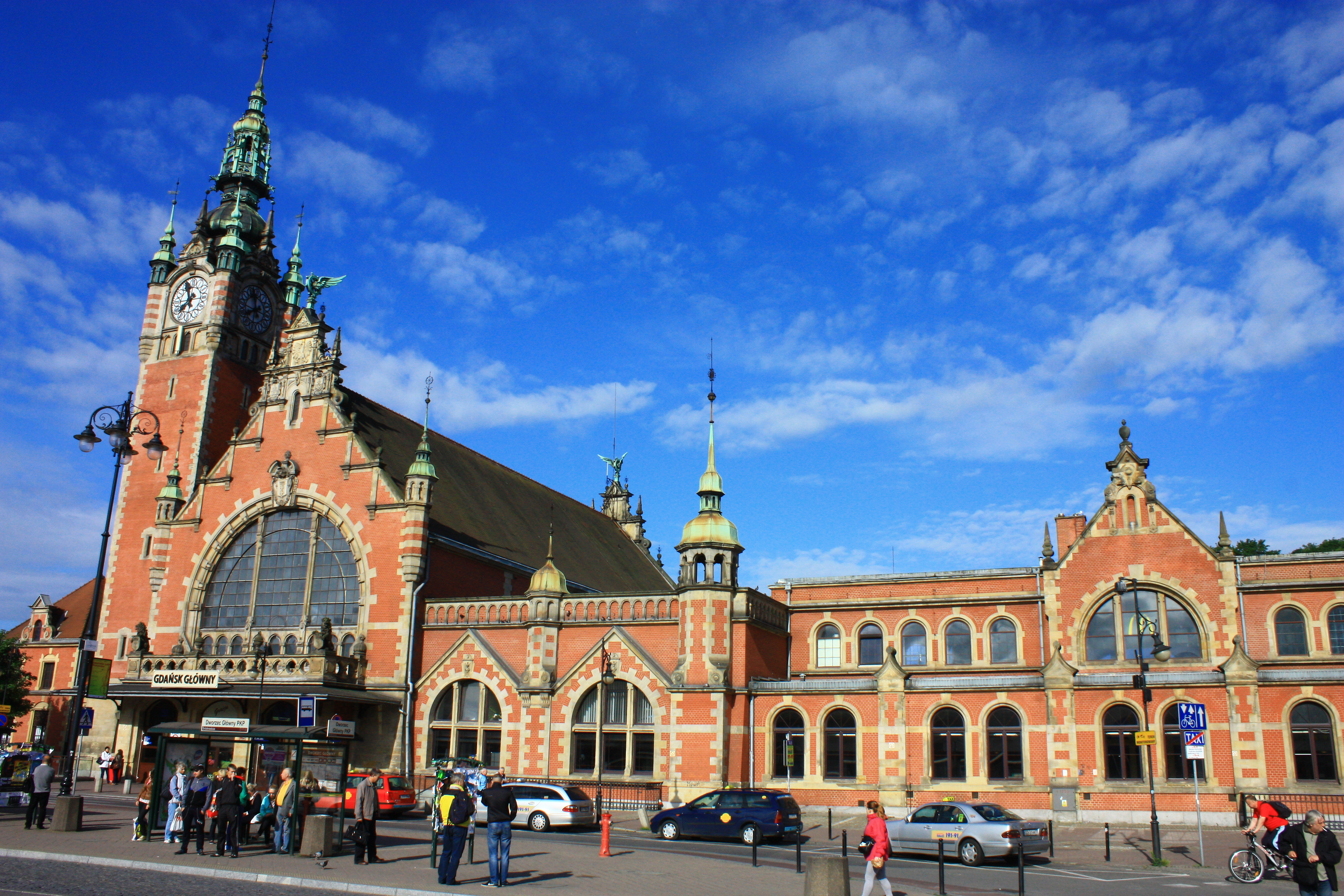
Front view

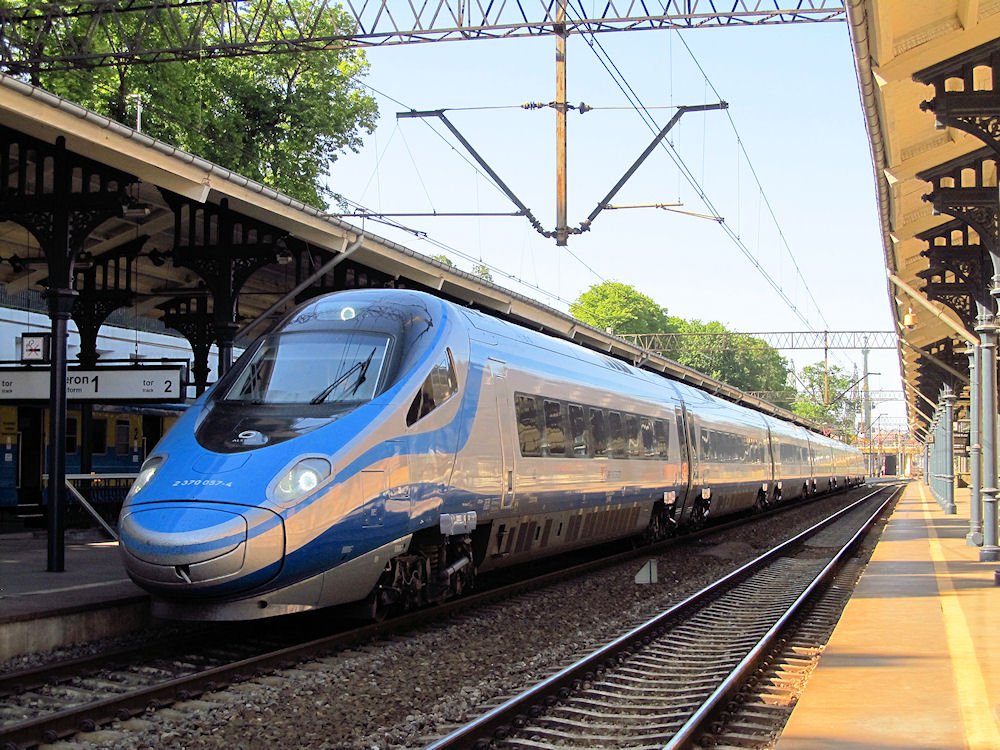
Train stop

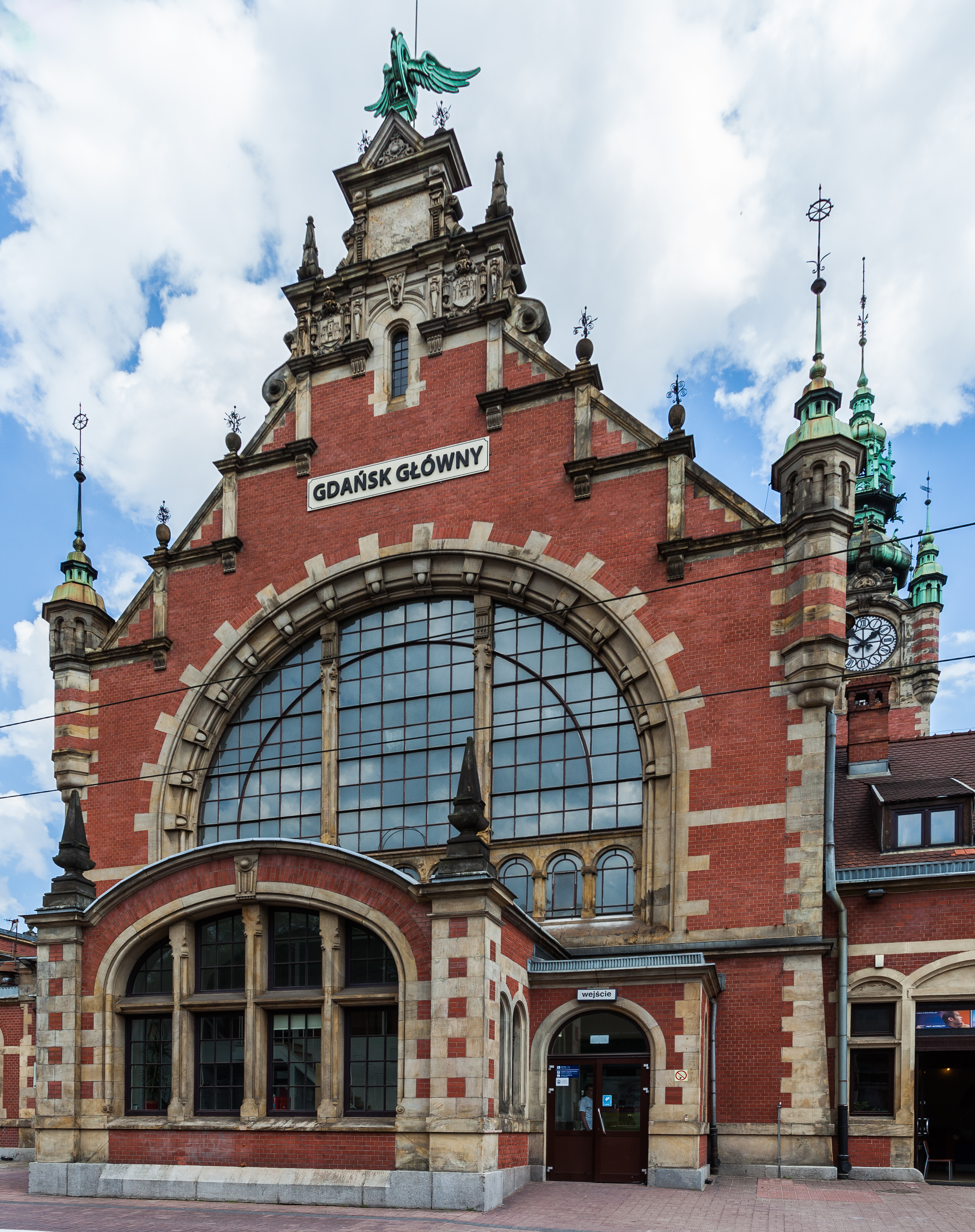
Main entrance

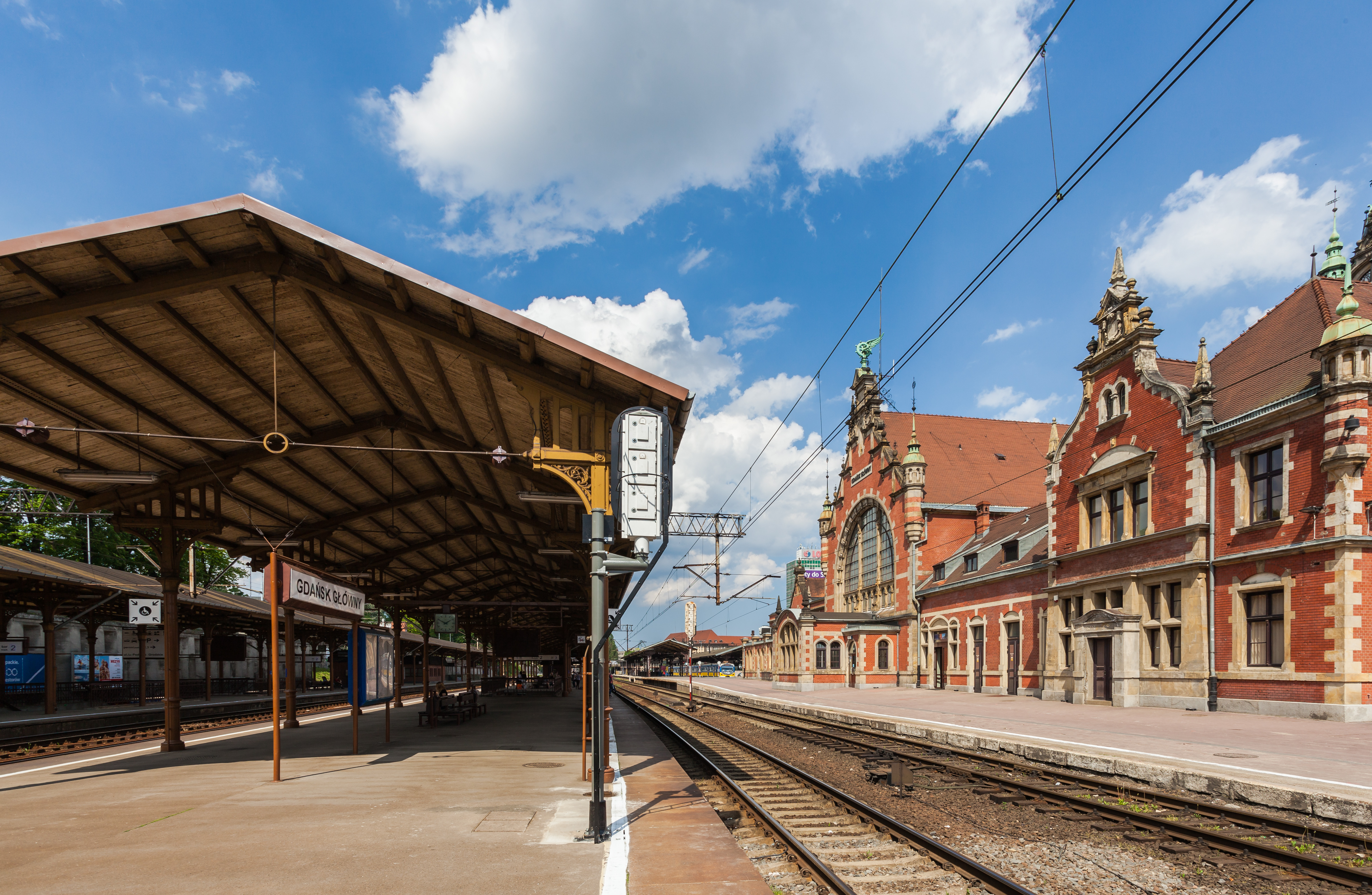
Rail

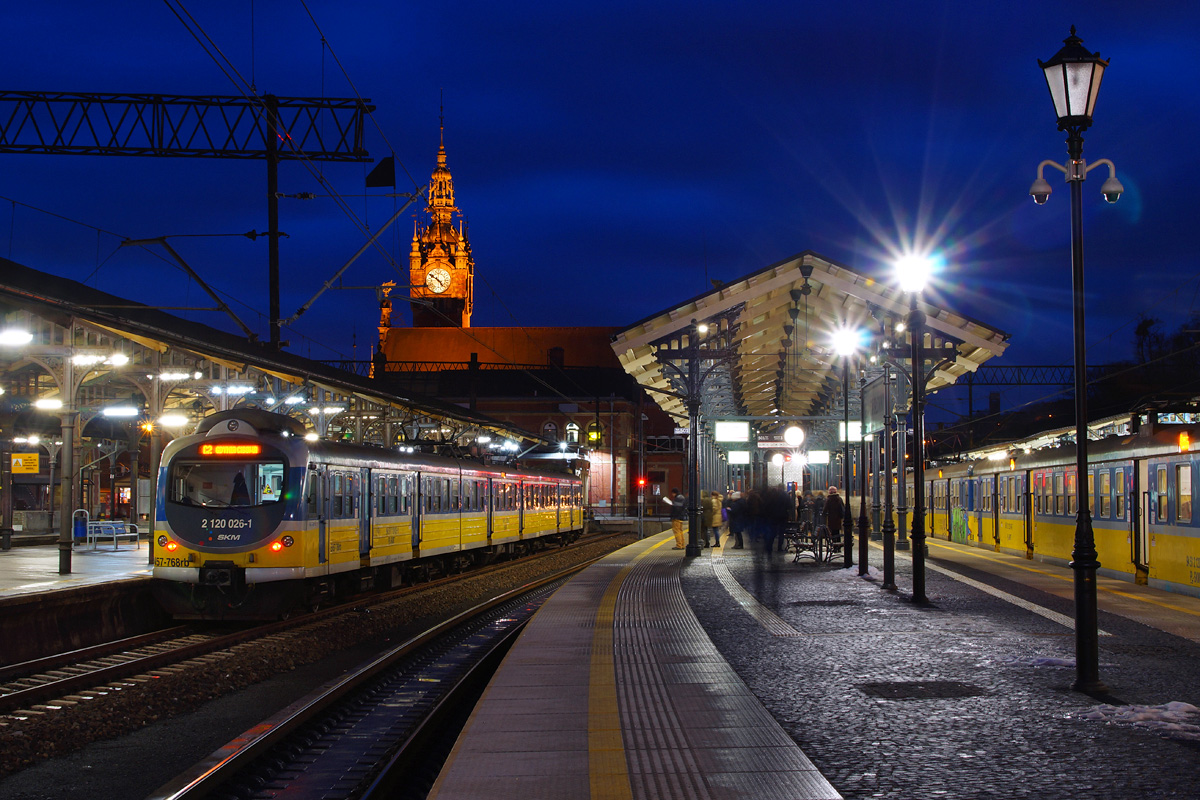
Platform 3

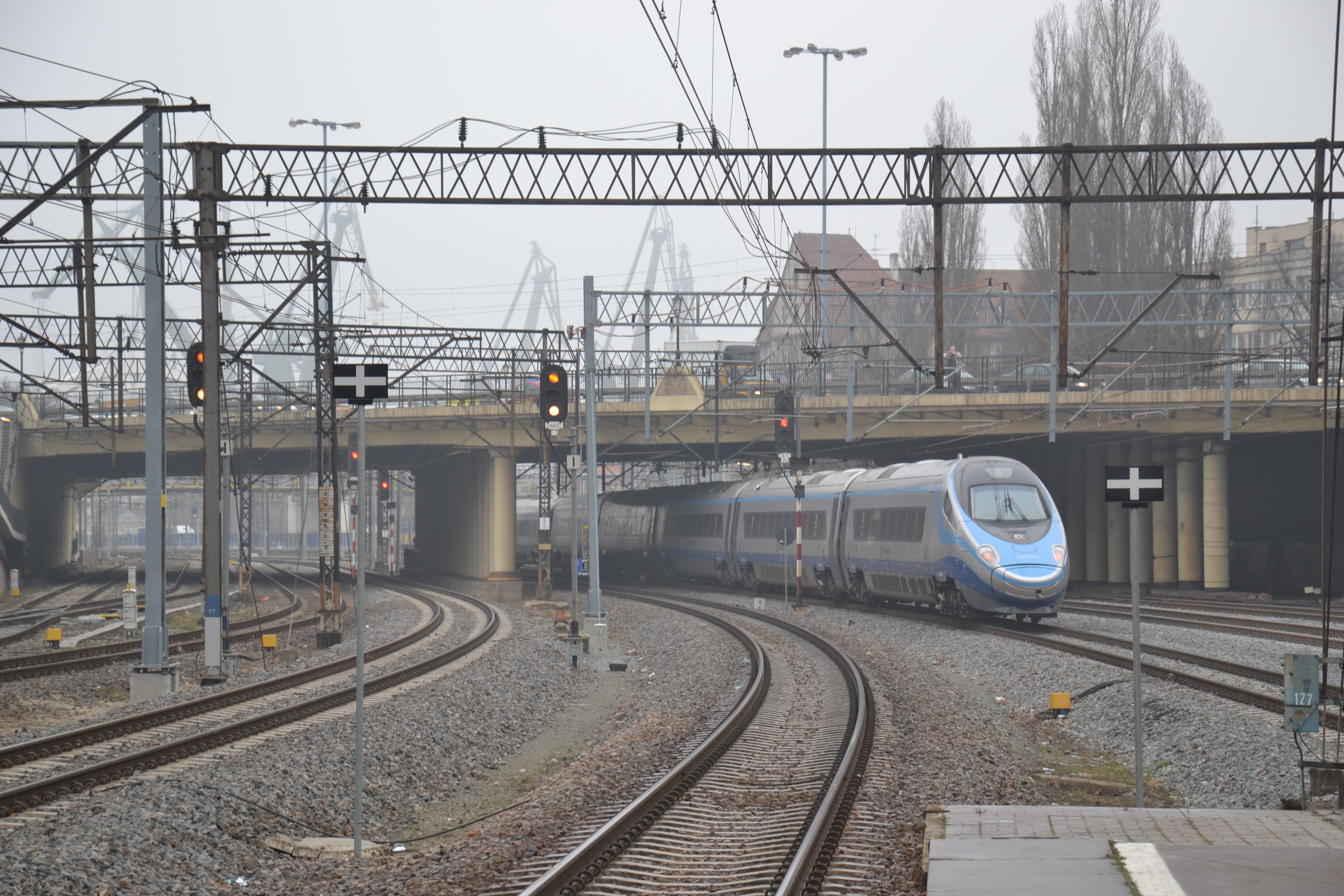
New Pendolino arriving to Gdańsk

== See also ==
- Rail transport in Poland
- List of busiest railway stations in Poland
