= Kamień Pomorski railway station =

Railway station in Kamień Pomorski, Poland

Kamień Pomorski
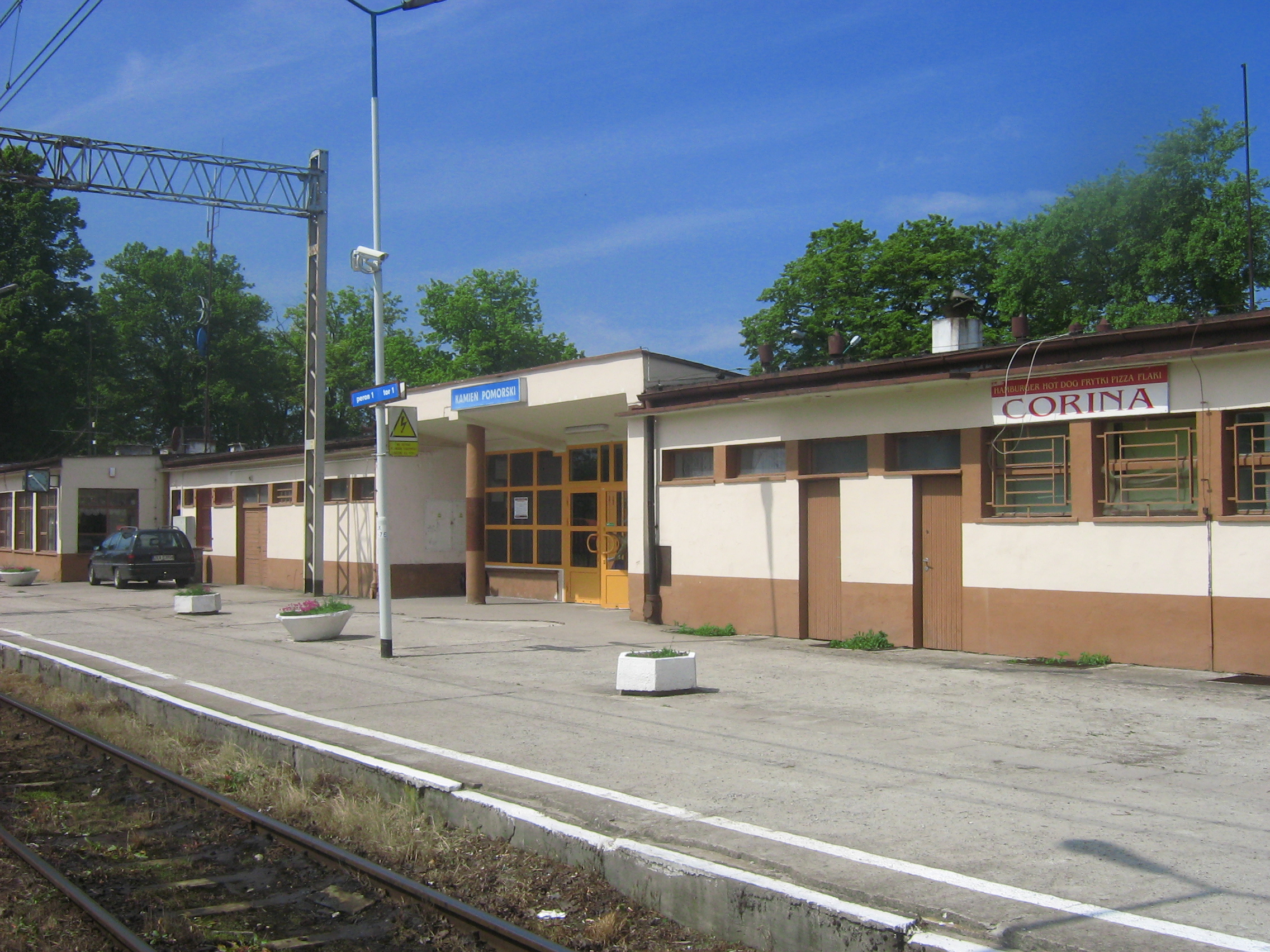
- Kamień Pomorski railway station

General information
- Location: Kamień Pomorski, West Pomeranian Voivodeship; Poland
- System: Railway Station
- Operator: Polregio
- Line: 407: Wysoka Kamieńska–Trzebiatów railway
- Platforms: 2
- Tracks: 2

History
- Former names: Cammin
Location
- Location within Poland

Kamień Pomorski (German: Bahnhof Pirna) is a railway station in the town of Kamień Pomorski, West Pomeranian Voivodeship, Poland. The station lies on the Wysoka Kamieńska–Trzebiatów railway. The train services are operated by Polregio.

== Train services ==
The station is served by the following services:

- Regional services (R) Kamień Pomorski - Wysoka Kamieńska - Szczecin

| Preceding station | Polregio | Following station |
|---|---|---|
| Terminus | PR | Jarszewo towards Szczecin Główny |
