= Gdańsk Brama Nizinna railway station =

Defunct railway station in Gdańsk

Gdańsk Brama Nizinna
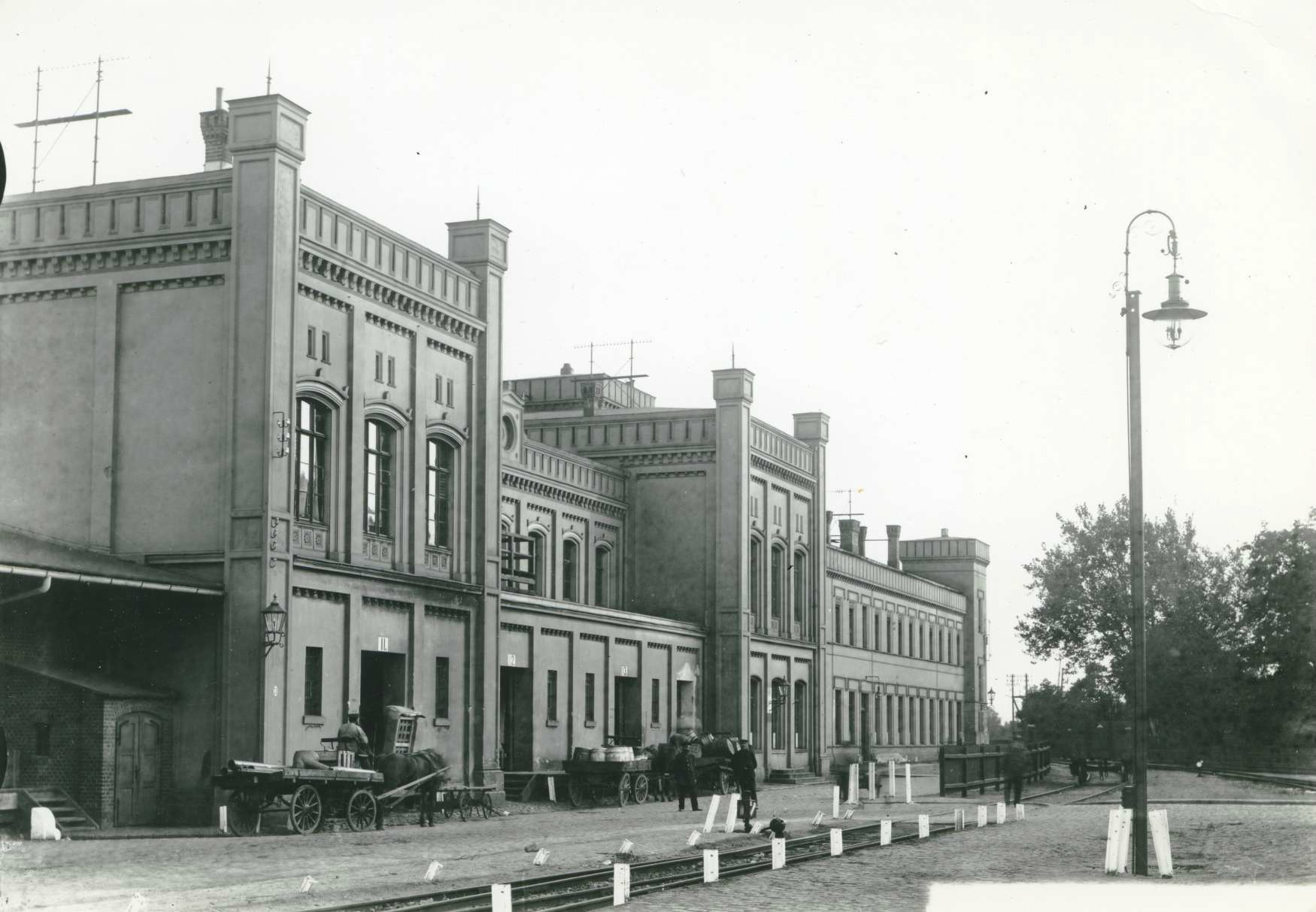
- The station's main building

General information
- Location: Stare Przedmieście, Śródmieście, Gdańsk; Poland
- Coordinates: 54.33967°N 18.64807°E
- System: Railway station

Construction
- Architectural style: Gothic Revival

History
- Opened: 5 August 1852
- Closed: 1995
Location

Gdańsk Brama Nizinna (German: Danzig Leeges Tor) was the first railway station in Gdańsk. It was opened in 1852 and was found in Stare Przedmieście.

== History ==
In 1852, the first railway line arrived in Danzig (as Gdańsk was then known), then found in the Kingdom of Prussia. It came from Dirschau and was a branch of the Prussian Eastern Railway from Berlin to Königsberg. Danzig Leeges Tor, a terminus station, was found at the end of the line. Its name came from the nearby Brama Nizinna, a 17th-century city gate. The station was in the vicinity of the Opływ Motławy and Motława. Trains accessed the station via the Railway Gate, a gap in the city's fortifications.

As the route between Danzig and Dirschau had only a single track, passengers were inconvenienced by having to change trains at Dirschau station, which resulted in the need for a second track, completed between 1909 and 1911.

Because of its positioning near water bodies and city fortifications, it became apparent that the station's development was limited. Thus, in 1870, a new railway station, Danzig Hohetor Bahnhof, was constructed. Danzig Leeges Tor stopped being a terminus for passenger trains in 1896, and in 1900, the new Danzig Hauptbahnhof became the central passenger station for the city of Danzig, reducing Danzig Leeges Tor to a freight station. The Gothic Revival station building burnt down in March 1945, during the siege of Danzig.

In the 1990s, the station, which had been transformed into a point for transfer of goods after the 1945, had its remaining buildings rented out by the Polish State Railways for commercial activity, such as the construction of a hostel. In 2014, those buildings were sold to Invest Komfort, a private company, for 26 million zł, which demolished them in 2015. The company now promises the construction of a new complex of apartment buildings.
