= Szczecin–Świnoujście Port railway =

Railway line in Poland

Szczecin–Świnoujście railway

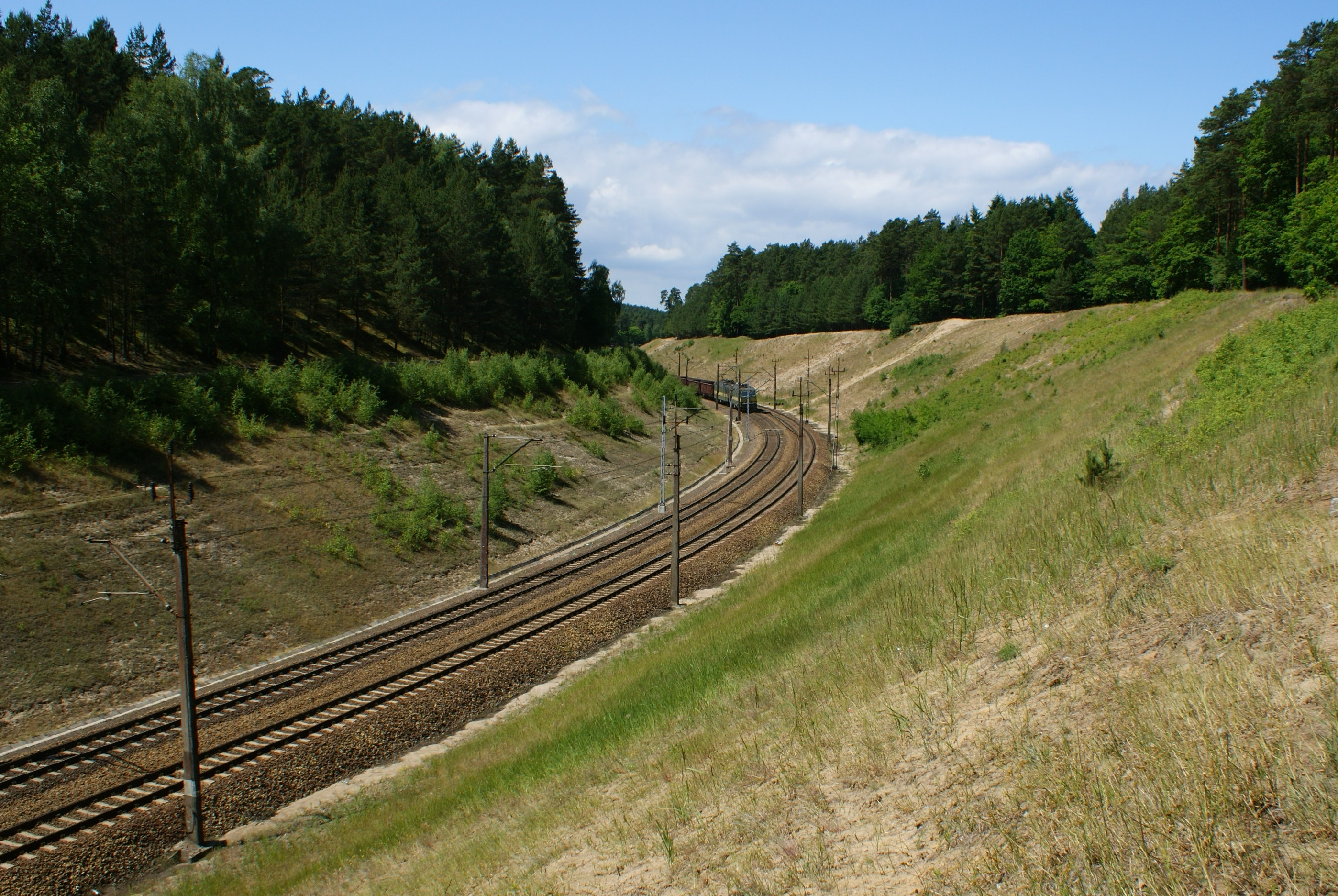

Overview
- Status: in use
- Locale: Poland
- Termini: Szczecin; Świnoujście

Service
- Type: Heavy rail
- Route number: 401

History
- Opened: 1882

Technical
- Line length: 100.713 km (62.580 mi)
- Track gauge: 1,435 mm (4 ft 8 1/2 in) standard gauge
- Electrification: 3000 V DC
- Operating speed: 130 km/h (81 mph)

The Szczecin–Świnoujście railway is a Polish railway line, 100 km (62 mi) long, connecting Szczecin Główny railway station in Szczecin and Świnoujście Port railway station in Świnoujście in the West Pomeranian Voivodeship in north-western Poland. The line is designated as PKP line 401 by PKP Polskie Linie Kolejowe. The railway is part of European TEN-T route E59 from Scandinavia to Vienna, Budapest and Prague. For this reason, the classification of the PLK line is also in the first-class category.

== Opening ==
The line was consists of segments built by several companies during the 19th century when Pomerania along with western Poland was controlled by the German Kingdom of Prussia. The first section of the line from Dąbie (today a part of Szczecin) to Goleniów was built in 1882 as part of Dąbie–Kołobrzeg railway (German: Altdamm-Colberger Eisenbahn-Gesellschaft), which continues to Gryfice as the present day Koszalin–Goleniów railway. Ten years later, the line was extended from Goleniów to Wolin by the Prussian Eastern Railway (Preußische Ostbahn). After the nationalization of the Prussian Eastern Railway in 1888, the next section was built under the banner of Prussian state railways (Preußische Staatseisenbahnen), before the end of the nineteenth century. In 1899, the line was extended to Międzyzdroje, and a year later to Swinoujście. In 1901, the station in Swinoujście (Ostswine) on the island of Wolin was connected by a railway ferry crossing to the today no longer existent Świnoujście Main Station (Swinemünde Hauptbahnhof) on the island of Usedom.

Between 1945 and 1948 trains could not operate between Recław and Wolin, because the bridge over the River Dziwna had been destroyed. Because of the Oder–Neisse line, in the Potsdam Agreement the line came under the ownership of the Polish State Railways. Following the War a ferry service was started from Świnoujście to Ystad in Sweden. In 1950 the railway line was extended a short distance to Świnoujście Port, to the ferry terminal. Only a few trains travel to the port station, the majority finishing at Świnoujście station.

== Electrification ==
In December 1979, electrification of the line from Szczecin to Goleniów was completed and in 1980 the rest of the line was electrified.

== Route ==
Most of the route (93.5%) is double track.

Between the signal boxes "SDA" (on the Poznań–Szczecin railway from / to Stargard ) and "SDC" (Szczecin–Świnoujście) is a track, No. 857, which is used by trains between Goleniów and Stargard without having to change direction in Szczecin.

== Modernisation ==
In 2016, it is planned to modernize the Szczecin Dąbie – Kliniska and Rurka – Goleniów sections, which will increase line capacity and increase line speeds to 160 km/h.

== Usage ==
=== Past ===
The German train timetable for the line shows that in 1917 the line was served by five train pairs per day between Szczecin and Świnoujście.

In 1981, 12 train pairs of passenger trains, and 5 pairs of fast trains which operated during the holiday season, operated on the line. Only 1 pair of trains ran to the station Świnoujście Port. One train pair operated to Kamień Pomorski and five train pairs operated to Gryfic from Goleniów.

=== Current ===
The line is used by the following trains:

- Intercity trains between Świnoujście and Szczecin, continuing to various parts of Poland, including Warsaw, Wrocław, Katowice and Kraków.
- Regional trains between Świnoujście (Port) and Szczecin, with most of these continuing to Poznań.

== See also ==
- Railway lines of Poland
