= Highland Gate =

City gate of Gdańsk, Poland

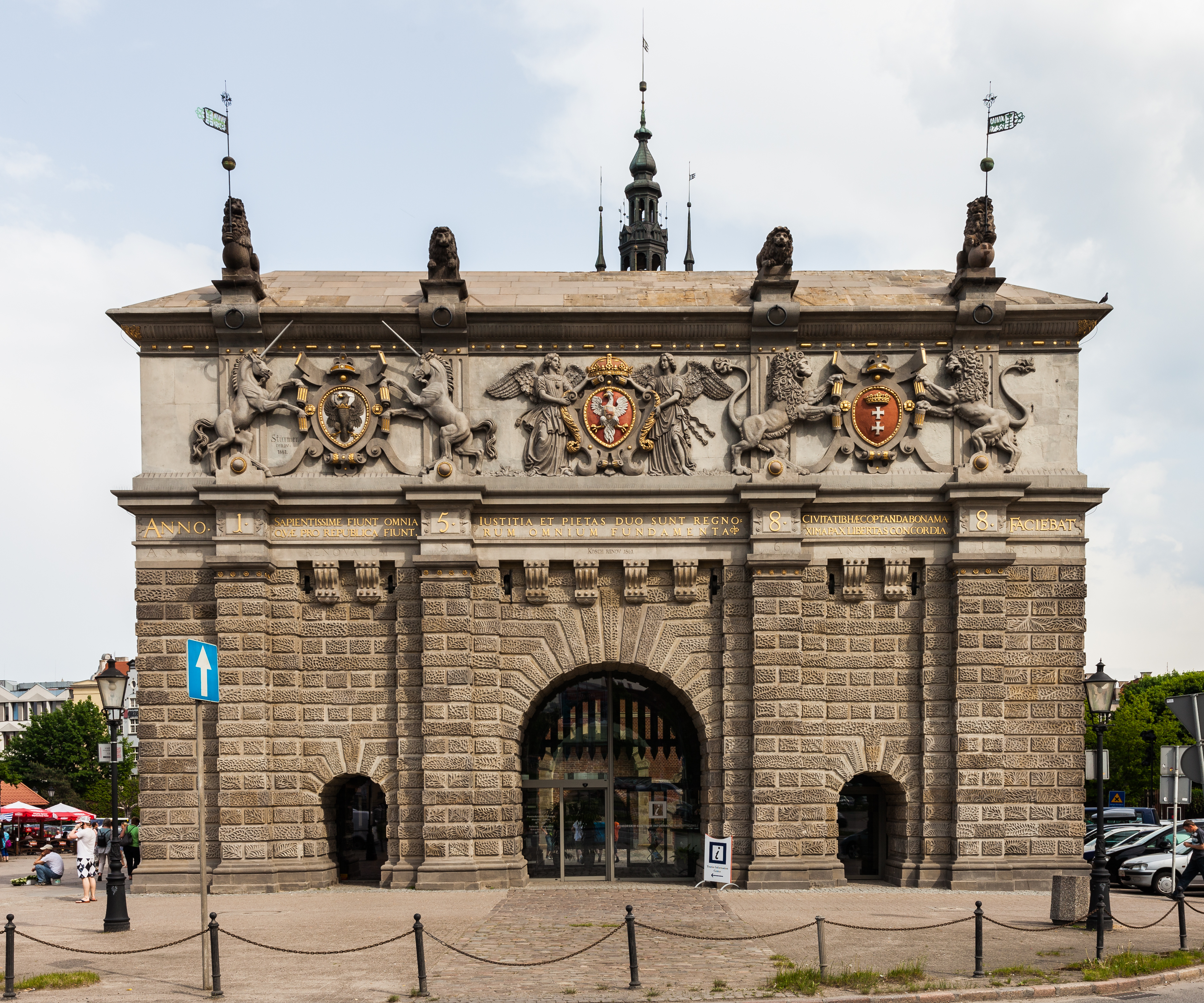
- The gate as it appeared in 2013

General information
- Location: ul. Wały Jagiellońskie 2 Gdańsk, Poland
- Coordinates: 54.34994°N 18.64652°E
- Year built: 1574–1575
- Completed: 1575
- Renovated: 2011

Historic Monument of Poland
- Designated: 1994-09-08
- Part of: Gdańsk – city within the 17th-century fortifications
- Reference no.: M.P. 1994 nr 50 poz. 415

The Highland Gate (Polish: Brama Wyżynna; Kashubian: Wësokô Brôma; German: Hohes Tor) is a 16th-century city gate located in the city centre of Gdańsk. Completed in 1575 and repeatedly renovated, it is one of the city's most important landmarks. It is on the regional heritage list.

== Architecture ==
The Highland Gate has a tall, imposing design and is constructed of stone. It bears three inscriptions:

- On the right, SAPIENTISSIME FIUNT OMNIA QUE PRO REPUBLICA FIUNT ("All things wise are for a republic");
- In the middle, IUSTITIA ET PIETAS DUO SUNT REGNORUM OMNIUM FUNDAMENTA ("The fundament of all kingdoms are justice and piety")
- And on the left, CIVITATIB. HAEC OPTANTA BONA MAXIMA PAX LIBERTAS CONCORDIA ("The most demanded goods of any city are peace, freedom, and harmony").

The top of the gate features three coats of arms: from right to left, the coat of arms Gdańsk, of Poland, and of the province of Royal Prussia.

== History ==
The first structure on the site of the Highland Gate was a modest brick building built from 1574 to 1575 by Hans Kramer. In 1588, it received stone exterior decorations from Willem van den Blocke which remain to this day, being again renovated in 1688, 1736, 1788, and 1861. In 1807, when Napoleon Bonaparte passed by the gate, he reportedly suggested taking it and bringing it to Paris. The other fortifications accompanying it, as well as its interior, were gradually removed in the 19th century.

The city guard house moved there in 1904, and after 1920, it was the place of the local offices of Norddeutscher Lloyd. In 1945, it was damaged amid the siege of Danzig. From 1946 to 1965, it was gradually renovated and used as an office building for Orbis after 1945, then for the Polish Tourist and Sightseeing Society after 1957. In 2002, the Gdańsk Museum bought the gate for archaeological work and renovations.

The building was renovated between 2009 and 2012. Costing a total of 12.8 million zł, the renovation efforts added new air conditioning and heating systems to the Highland Gate, redecorated the exterior, recoloured the coats of arms, created a conference room on the ground floor, and installed a modern visitor centre on that floor.
