= Świnoujście Port railway station =

Railway station in Świnoujście, Poland

Świnoujście Port
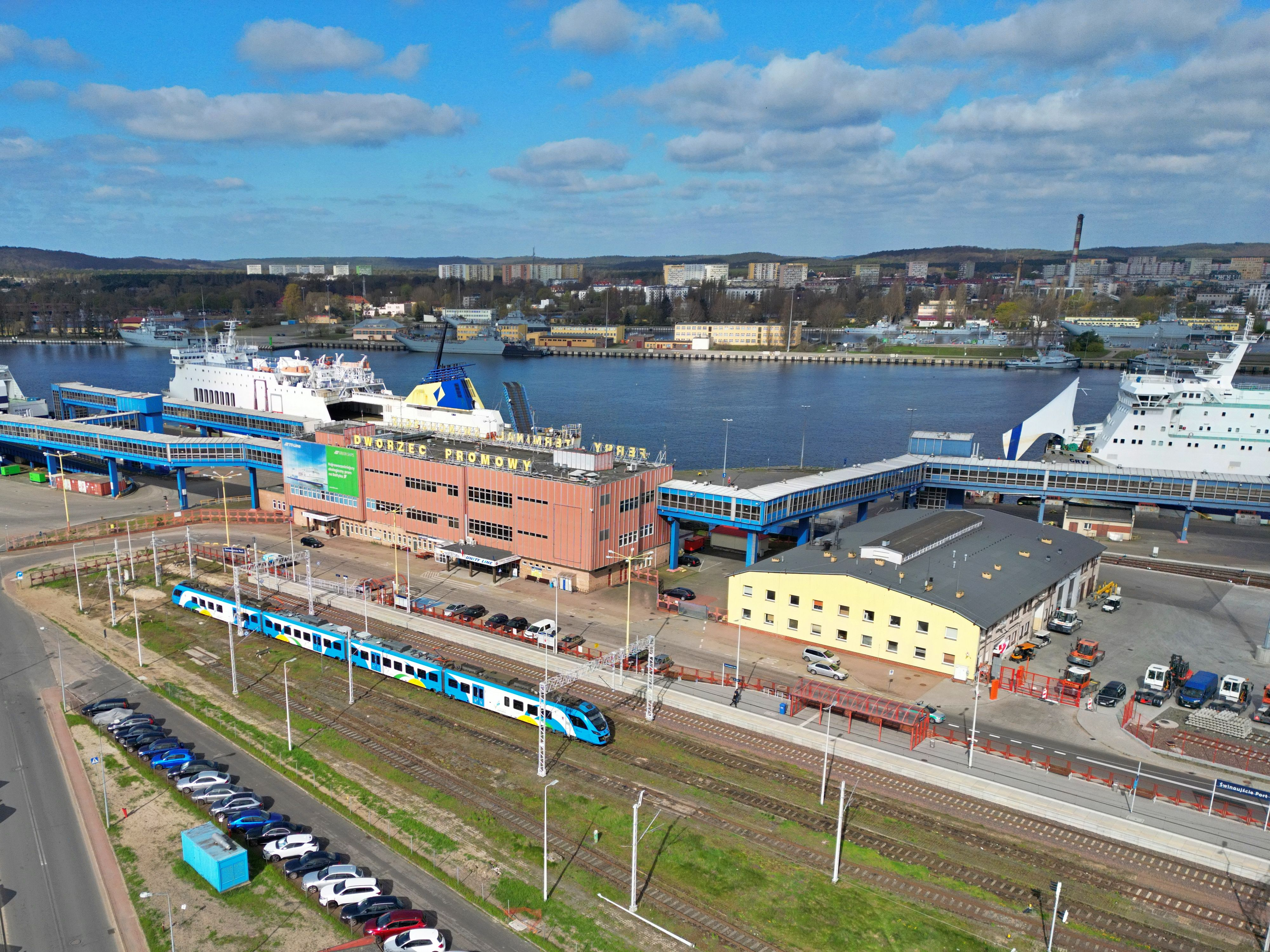
- Ariel view of the station in 2023

General information
- Location: Swinoujscie, West Pomeranian Voivodeship; Poland
- Owner: Polish State Railways
- Lines: Szczecin–Świnoujście railway; Świnoujście Port–Świnoujście Główne
- Platforms: 1

History
- Opened: 2 May 1948

Services
Preceding station	Polregio	Following station
Świnoujście towards Szczecin Główny	PR	Terminus
Route map
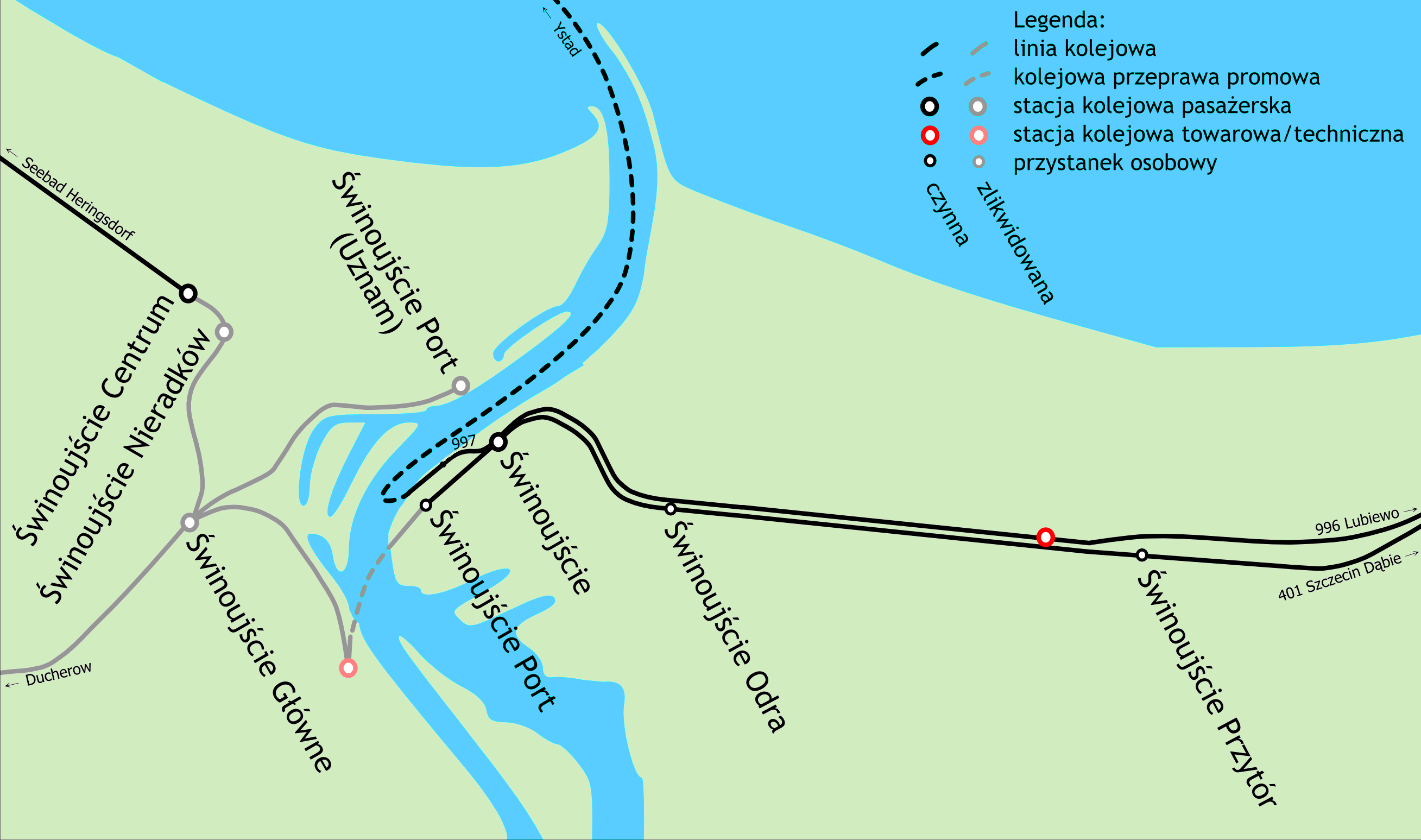
Location
- Location within Poland Location within West Pomeranian Voivodeship

Świnoujście Port is a railway station in the city of Świnoujście, in the West Pomeranian Voivodeship in northern Poland. It is located at the Świnoujście Ferry Terminal.

== History ==
The station was opened by Polish State Railways as Odra Port on 2 May 1948 as the terminus after the line was extended from Świnoujście railway station. The station was closed between 1954 and 1967, when it reopened to only passenger services as Świnoujście Port. The station also closed between 1990 and 1994.

== Train services ==
- Regional services (PR) Szczecin Główny - Goleniów - Świnoujście Port
