= Szczecin Dąbie railway station =

Railway station in Szczecin, Poland

Szczecin Dąbie
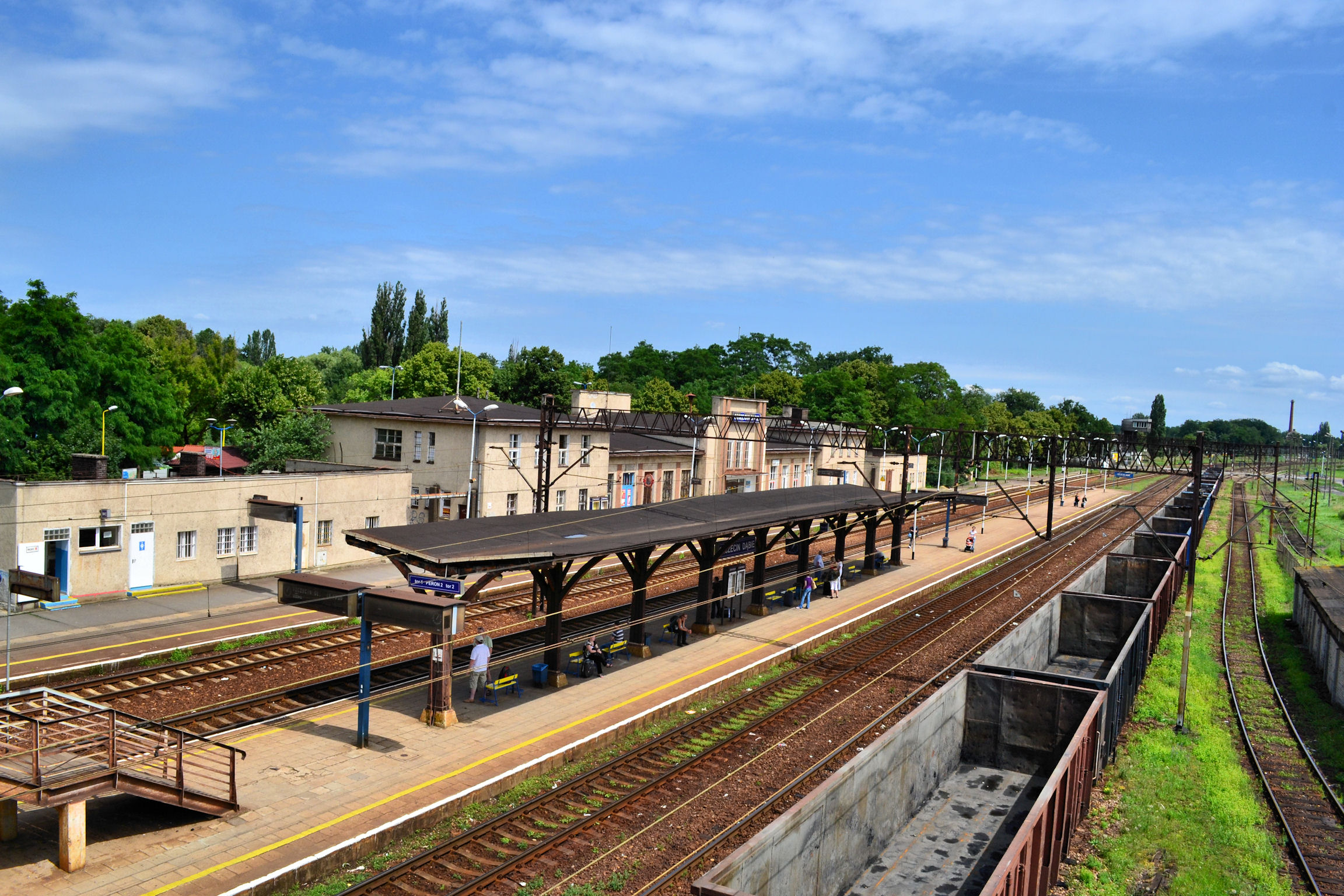
- Szczecin Dąbie railway station

General information
- Location: Dąbie, Szczecin, West Pomeranian, Poland
- Coordinates: 53°23′28″N 14°40′09″E
- System: Stettin-Altdamm
- Lines: Poznań-Szczecin railway Szczecin Dąbie–Świnoujście Port railway Szczecin Dąbie–Sobieradz railway Szczecin Dąbie–Szczecin Podjuchy railway
- Platforms: 3
- Tracks: 6
Location

Szczecin Dąbie (Polish: stacja kolejowa Szczecin Dąbie) is a railway station in the city of Szczecin, West Pomeranian, Poland. The train services are operated by PKP and Polregio.

== Public transport ==
Bus services 64 and 77 depart from outside the station.
