= Świnoujście railway station =

Railway station in Świnoujście, Poland

Coordinates: 53.9048°N 14.2666°E

Świnoujście
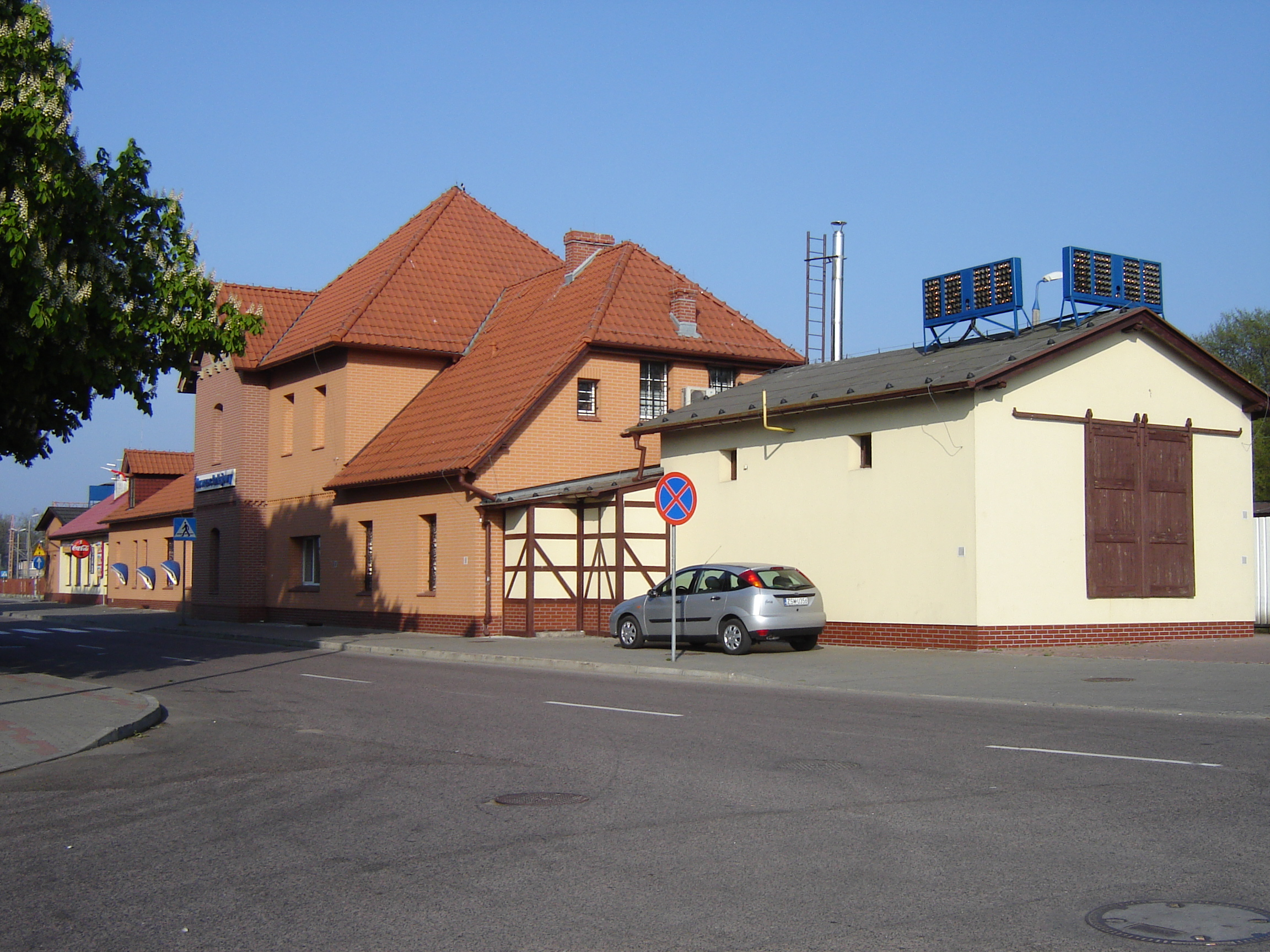
- Świnoujście railway station

General information
- Location: Świnoujście, West Pomeranian Voivodeship; Poland
- System: Railway Station
- Operator: PKP Polskie Linie Kolejowe
- Line: 401: Szczecin Dąbie–Świnoujście Port railway
- Platforms: 3
- Tracks: 3

History
- Opened: 1900
- Electrified: 1980
- Former names: 1900-1945: Ostswine
Location
- Location within Poland

Świnoujście is the main railway station in the city of Świnoujście, in the West Pomeranian Voivodeship, Poland. The station and is located on the Szczecin–Świnoujście Port railway. The train services are operated by PKP Intercity and Polregio.

== Train services ==
The following trains run from this station:

- Intercity: Świnoujście - Szczecin - Krzyz - Poznan - Kutno - Warsaw - Lublin
- Intercity: Świnoujście - Szczecin - Krzyz - Poznan - Kutno - Lodz - Krakow
- Intercity: Świnoujście - Szczecin - Krzyz - Poznan - Ostrow Wielkopolski - Katowice/Krakow
- Intercity: Świnoujście - Szczecin - Krzyz - Poznan - Leszno - Wroclaw - Opole - Katowice - Krakow - Rzeszow - Przemysl
- Intercity: Świnoujście - Szczecin - Kostrzyn - Rzepin - Zielona Gora - Wroclaw - Katowice
- Intercity: Świnoujście - Szczecin - Kostrzyn - Rzepin - Zielona Gora - Wroclaw - Kedzierzyn-Kozle - Bielsko Biala
- Regional (R): Świnoujście - Szczecin - Choszczno - Krzyz - Wronki - Szamotuly - Poznan

Preceding station	Polregio	Following station
Świnoujście Port Terminus	PR	Świnoujście Warszów towards Poznań Główny

== Public transport ==
The coach station is located opposite the train station. The ferry to the main part of Świnoujście is also nearby, this operates every 20 minutes. Local bus services 1, 5, 7 and 10 serve the station.
