= Szczecin Główny railway station =

Railway station in Szczecin, Poland

Szczecin Główny
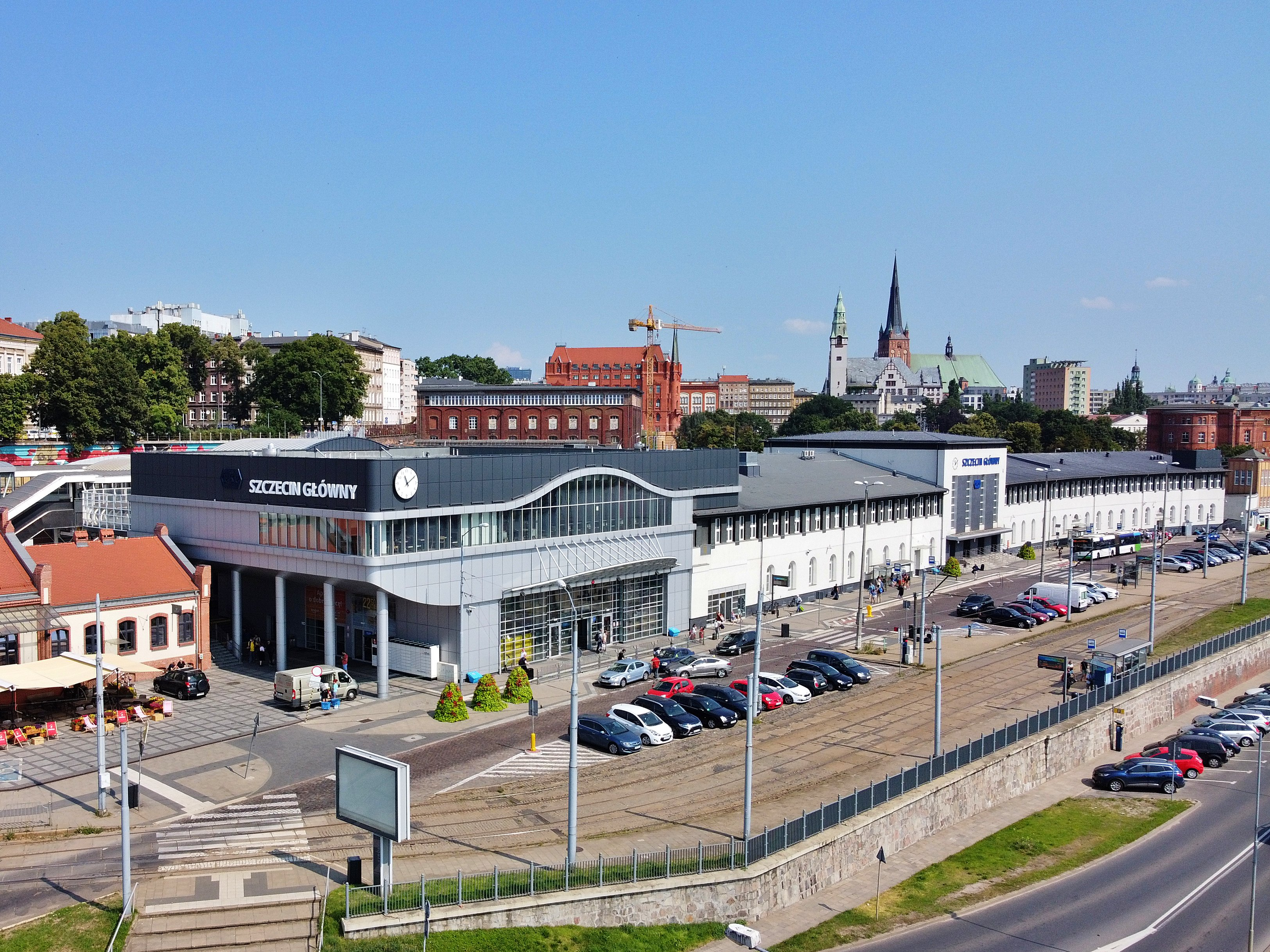
- Szczecin Główny railway station

General information
- Location: Szczecin, West Pomeranian Voivodeship; Poland
- System: Railway Station
- Operator: PKP Polskie Linie Kolejowe
- Lines: 273: Wrocław–Szczecin railway 351: Poznań–Szczecin railway 406: Szczecin-Trzebież Szczeciński railway 408: Bützow-Szczecin railway 409: Berlin-Szczecin railway
- Platforms: 5
- Tracks: 8

Other information
- Fare zone: : 3473 (to/from Germany only)

History
- Opened: 15 August 1843; 183 years ago
- Rebuilt: 2007, 2011-2016

Services
Preceding station	PKP Intercity	Following station
Terminus	EIC	Szczecin Dabie towards Warszawa Wschodnia
Terminus	IC	Szczecin Dabie towards Gdańsk Główny
Terminus	IC	Szczecin Dabie towards Olsztyn Główny
Terminus	IC	Szczecin Dabie towards Białystok
Preceding station	Polregio	Following station
Terminus	PR	Szczecin Port Centralny towards Poznań Główny
Terminus	PR	Szczecin Port Centralny towards Piła Główna
Terminus	PR	Szczecin Port Centralny towards Zielona Góra
Terminus	PR	Szczecin Port Centralny towards Kamień Pomorski
Terminus	PR	Szczecin Zdroje towards Świnoujście Port
Terminus	PR	Szczecin Port Centralny towards Słupsk
Preceding station	DB Regio Nordost	Following station
Szczecin Gumieńce towards Bützow	RE 4	Terminus
Szczecin Gumieńce towards Berlin Gesundbrunnen	RE 66	Terminus
Szczecin Gumieńce towards Angermünde	RB 66	Terminus
Location
- Location within Poland

Szczecin Główny (Polish for Szczecin main station) is the principal railway station of the city of Szczecin, in the West Pomeranian Voivodeship, Poland. The station opened on 15 August 1843 and is located on the Berlin-Szczecin railway, Wrocław–Szczecin railway, Poznań–Szczecin railway, Bützow-Szczecin railway and Szczecin-Trzebież Szczeciński railway. The train services are operated by PKP Intercity, Polregio and Deutsche Bahn.

== History ==
In 1836, the Berlin Committee for the Construction of the Berlin-Szczecin railway was founded. The railway line was completed in 1842, and on 15 August 1843, the first train from Berlin pulled into the station, which at the time was known as the Berliner Bahnhof. This line ended in Berlin at Berlin Stettiner Bahnhof, later renamed Berlin Nordbahnhof). This was the start of the railways in Pomerania.

The station also served as the initial phase towards dismantling the Prussian city fortifications of Fort Prussia (Fort Preußen). In 1846, a railway line was constructed to Stargard (and extended to Poznań by 1848). This line intersected the Berlin line at a right angle as the station was then a terminal station. This necessitated the excavation of a 100-meter tunnel into the hillside. At that time, the track layout led through the southern part of Kępa Parnicka island (now Maklerska Street, formerly Eisenbahnstraße, meaning Railway Street), along the Rybne Canal (until 1859), and then alongside Siedlińska Kępa island and along the present-day Hangarowa Street to the [Dąbie, Szczecin] station. Until 1857, a railway line led through Szczecin from Berlin to Königsberg via Krzyż, Piła, Bydgoszcz, and Tczew.

In 1859, the station was expanded and transformed into a through station, with the current track layout passing through the northern part of Kępa Parnicka island, leading to the present-day Szczecin Central Port station. In 1898, the last line was extended from the station to Jasienica, Police (now a northern district of the city of Police. An out-of-use locomotive depot is situated in the hillside.

Around 1900, the station building was constructed, and after renovations and reconstruction following the damages of World War II, it stands to this day.

Between 1975 and 1980, most of the Szczecin railway junction was electrified. Near the station, there are two signal boxes: "SG" and "SG 11". Currently, the station has four platforms covered by canopies (the canopy on the first platform is pre-war). Overhead passages lead to the platforms; underground passages still exist but are no longer accessible to passengers. In close proximity to the station, on Czarnieckiego Street, the headquarters of the West Pomeranian Regional Transport Company is located. The City Tourist Trail begins and ends at the station. Nearby public transport stops: "Dworzec Główny" and "Owocowa Dworzec".

The complex of buildings housing the Railway Directorate in Szczecin dominates the area around the station.

== Modernisation ==
In 2007 the station was partially renovated in connection with the end of the regatta The Tall Ships Races. The entrance hall of the station and the footbridge were modernised.

On 20 December 2010, an agreement was signed for the reconstruction of the station and its surroundings. It was planned that by the end of 2014 the works would be completed.

On 1 October 2014 PKP signed a contract for the reconstruction of the railway. As part of this investment, the station building, platforms 1 and 4 were rebuilt and a new footbridge was built. In the future it is planned for the second phase of the modernisation of the station. The main building of the station was completely closed for renovation, with a temporary station opened. On 29 April 2016 the modernised station was opened.

On 14 November 14, 2017, Polish State Railways signed an agreement with the company Porr for the next stage of station reconstruction, which includes, among others, the reconstruction of platforms 2 and 3 as well as a footbridge.

On 13 November 2018, PKP PLK signed an agreement with Railway Communication Works for the expansion of the passenger information system.

== Train services ==
The station is served by the following service(s):

- Express Intercity services (EIC) Szczecin — Warsaw
- Intercity services Świnoujście - Szczecin - Stargard - Krzyż - Poznań - Kutno - Warsaw - Białystok / Lublin - Rzeszów
- Intercity services Świnoujście - Szczecin - Stargard - Krzyż - Poznań - Leszno - Wrocław - Opole - Katowice - Kraków - Rzeszów - Przemyśl
- Intercity services Szczecin - Stargard - Krzyż - Poznań - Kutno - Łowicz - Łódź - Kraków
- Intercity services Szczecin - Stargard - Kalisz Pomorski - Piła - Bydgoszcz - Toruń - Kutno - Łowicz - Warsaw - Lublin
- Intercity services (IC) Szczecin - Koszalin - Słupsk - Gdynia - Gdańsk
- Intercity services (IC) Szczecin - Koszalin - Słupsk - Gdynia - Gdańsk - Elbląg/Iława - Olsztyn
- Intercity services (IC) Szczecin - Koszalin - Słupsk - Gdynia - Gdańsk - Elbląg - Olsztyn - Białystok
- Intercity services Świnoujście - Szczecin - Kostrzyn - Rzepin - Zielona Góra - Legnica - Wrocław - Opole - Katowice / Częstochowa - Kraków - Rzeszów - Przemyśl
- Intercity services Świnoujście - Szczecin - Kostrzyn - Rzepin - Zielona Góra - Legnica - Wrocław - Opole - Częstochowa - Kielce - Radom - Lublin
- Regional services (R) Świnoujście - Goleniów - Szczecin - Stargard - Choszczno - Krzyż - Szamotuły - Poznań
- Regional services (R) Szczecin - Stargard - Białogard - Koszalin - Slupsk
- Regional services (R) Szczecin - Goleniów - Goleniów Airport - Gryfice - Kołobrzeg
- Regional services (R) Szczecin - Stargard - Kalisz Pomorski - Piła
- Regional services (R) Szczecin - Kostrzyn - Rzepin - Zielona Góra
- Regional services RE 4 Lübeck - Bad Kleinen - Güstrow - Neubrandenburg - Pasewalk - Szczecin
- Regional services RE 66 Berlin - Eberswalde - Angermünde - Tantow - Szczecin
- Regional services RB 66 Angermünde - Tantow - Szczecin

== Public transport ==
Bus and tram services depart from the station.

== Gallery ==
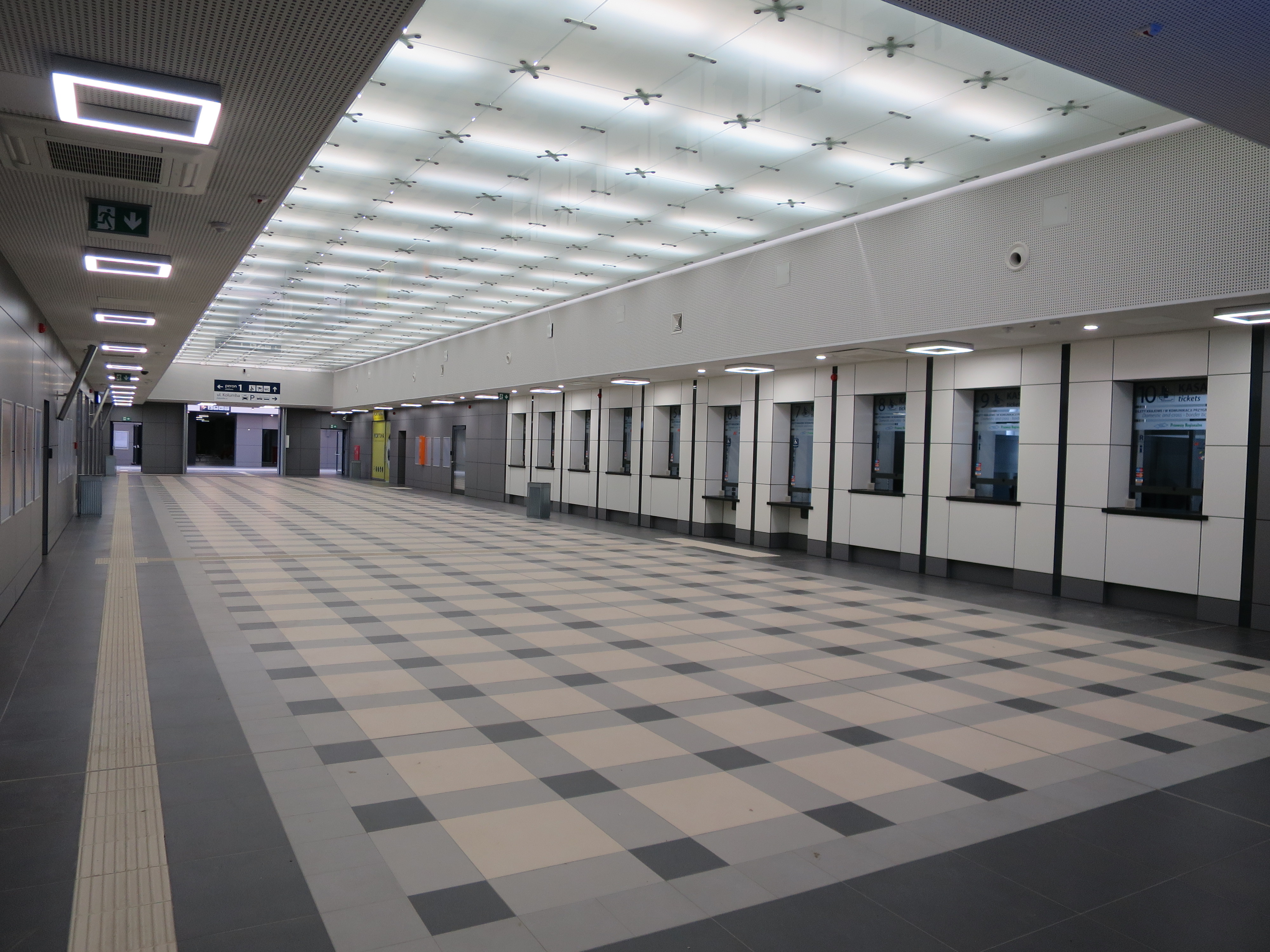
The ticket office

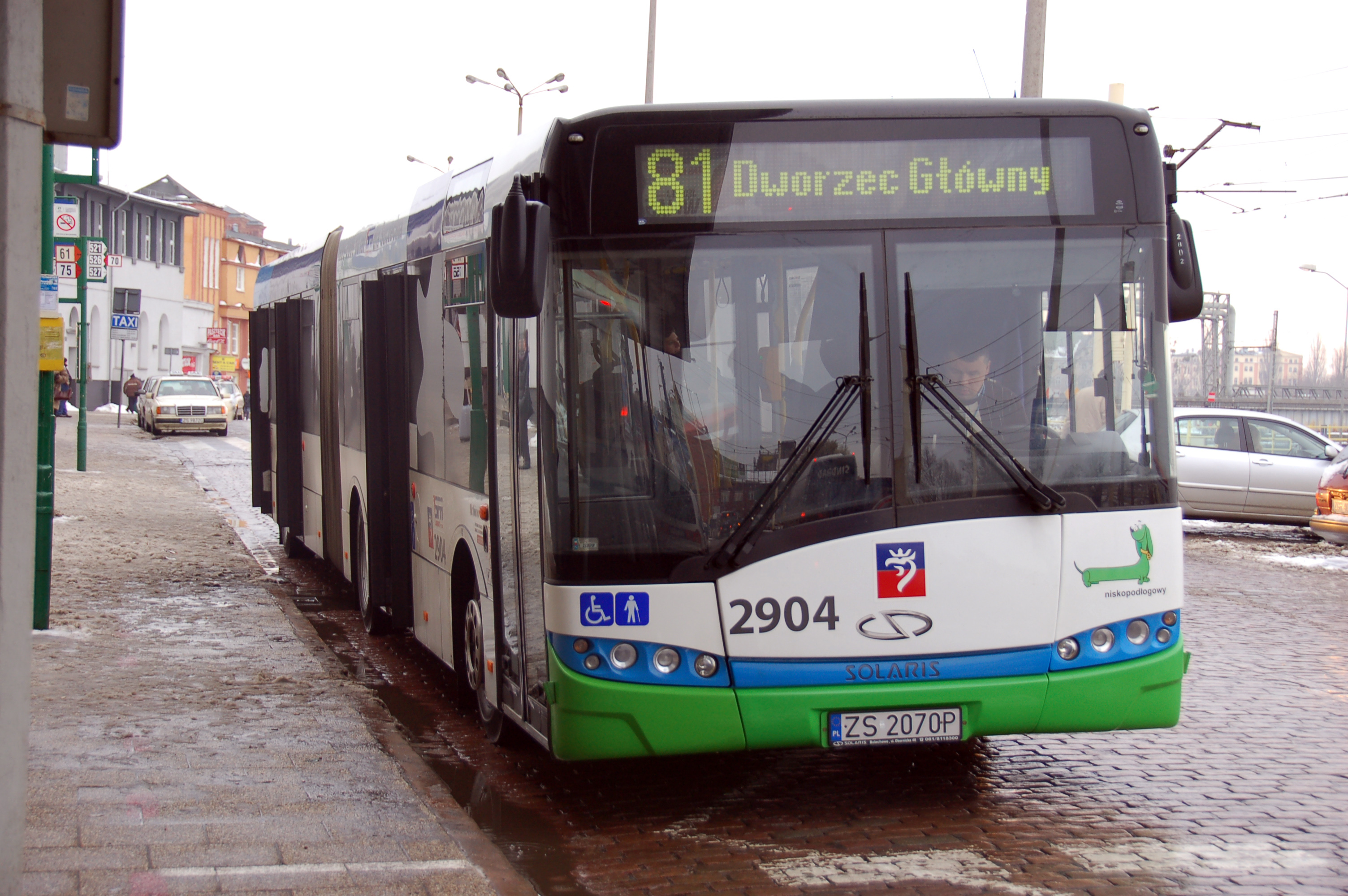
A bus outside the station

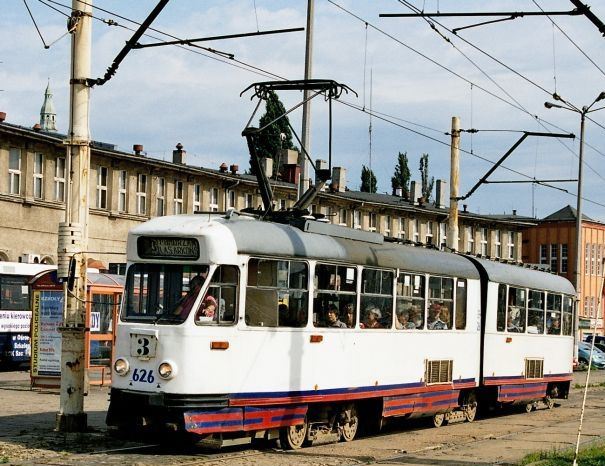
A tram outside the station

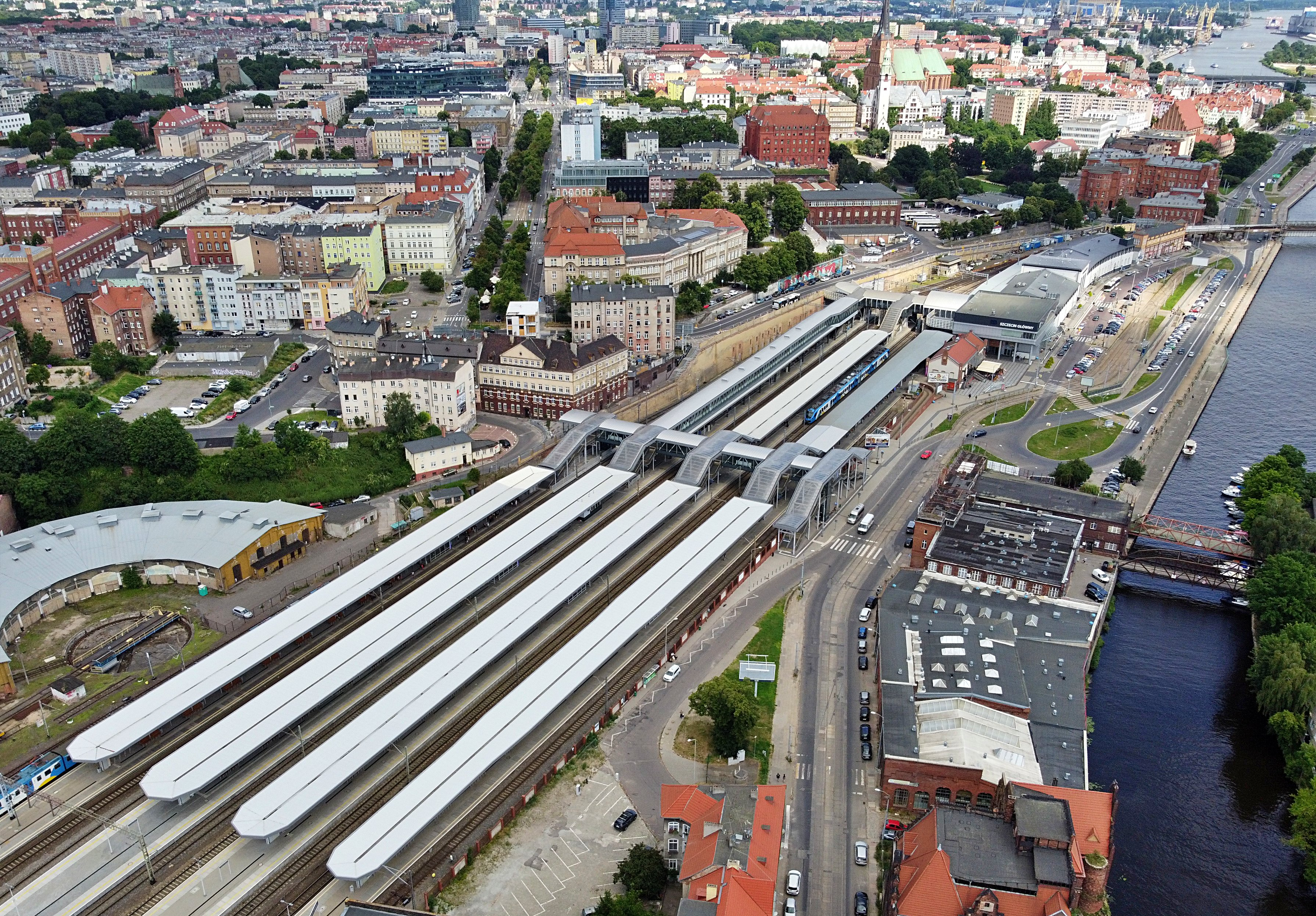
The station

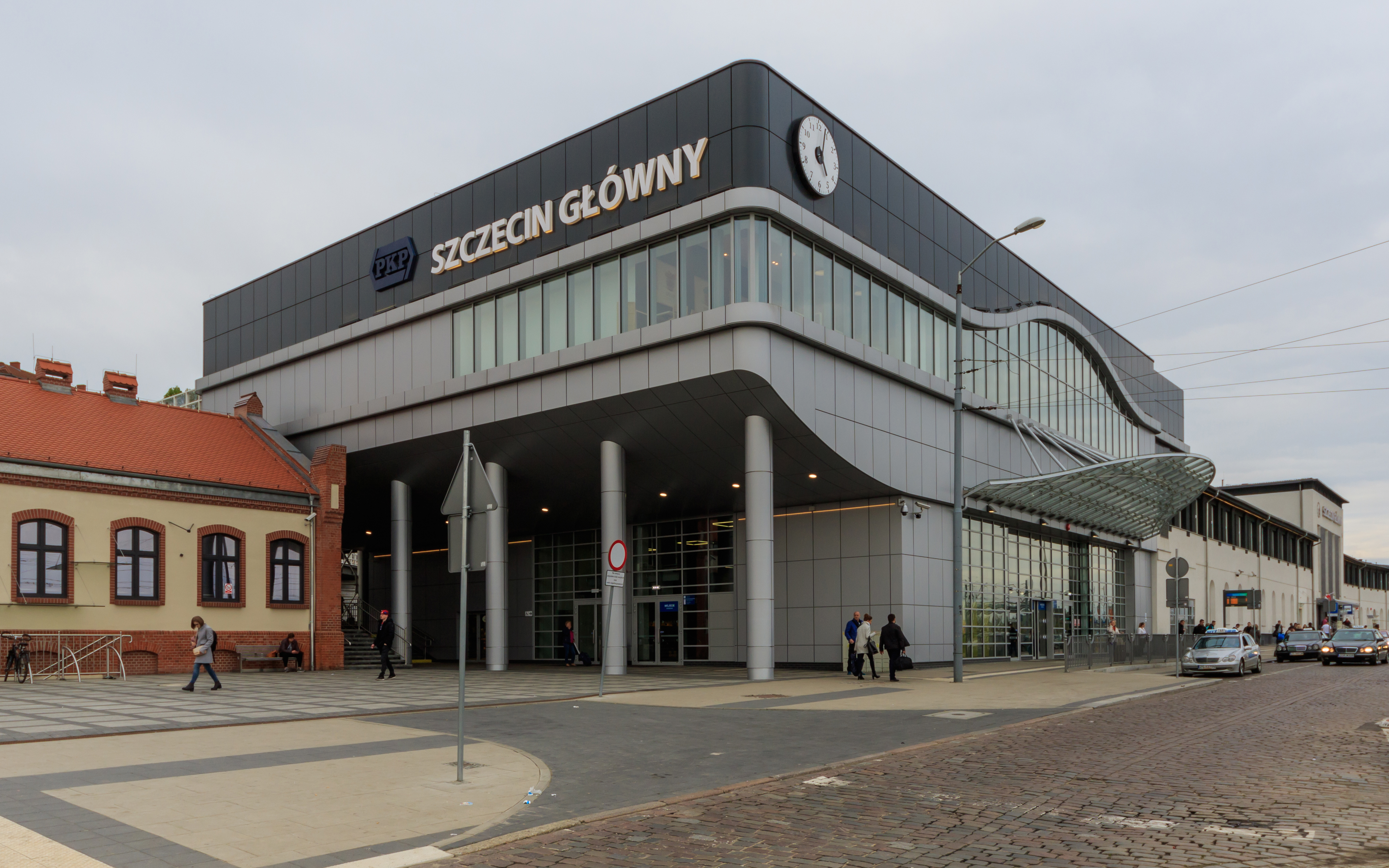
The modernised station
