= Poznań Junikowo railway station =

Railway station in Poznań, Poland

Coordinates: 52.3778°N 16.8242°E

Poznań Junikowo
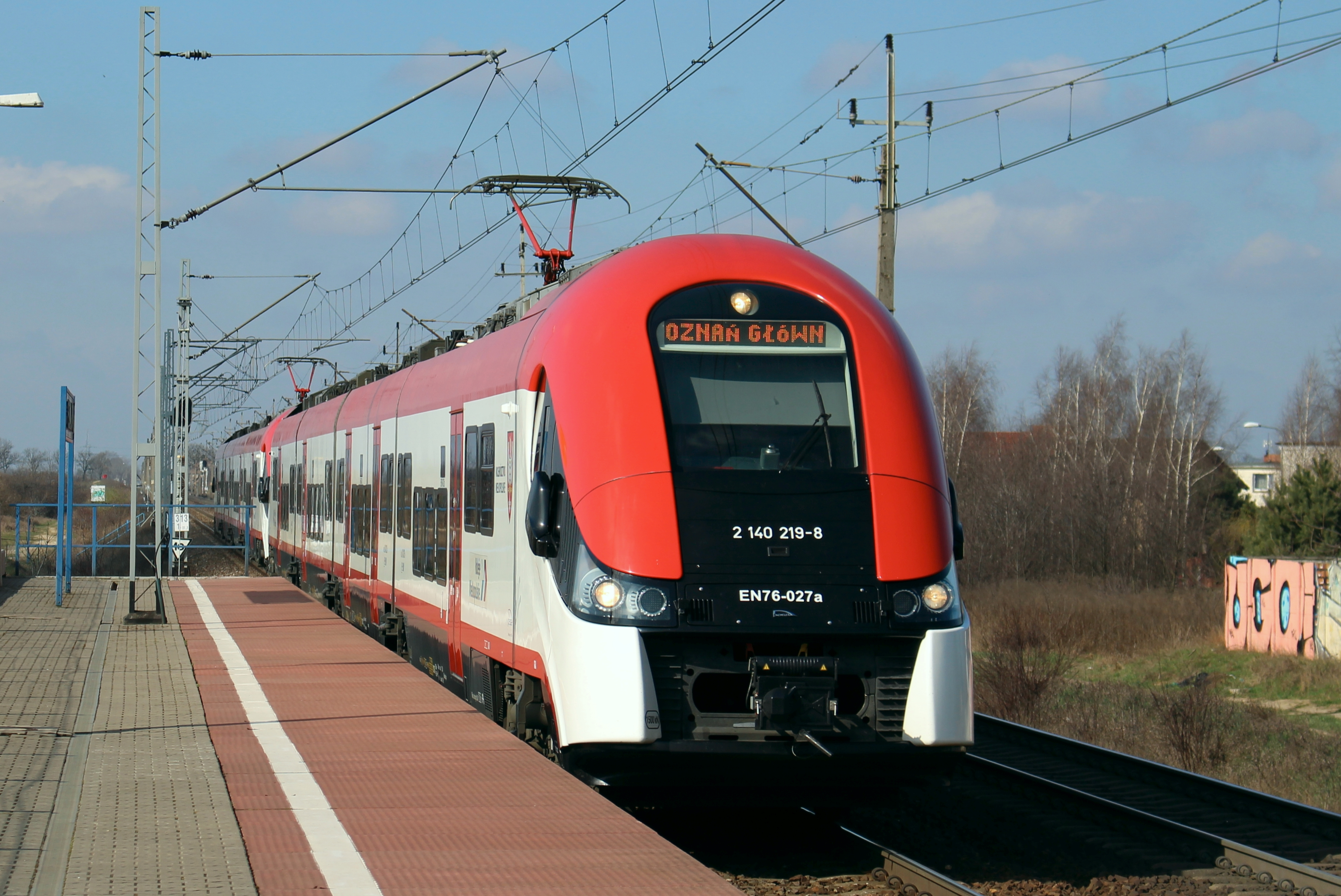
- Poznań Junikowo railway station

General information
- Location: Poznań, Greater Poland Voivodeship; Poland
- System: Railway Station
- Operator: Polregio; Greater Poland Railways
- Line: Warsaw–Kunowice railway
- Platforms: 2
- Tracks: 2

History
- Opened: 30 October 2007; 18 years ago

Services
Preceding station	KW	Following station
Poznań Górczyn towards Poznań Główny	Poznań - Zbąszynek	Palędzie towards Zbąszynek
Preceding station	Poznań Metropolitan Railway	Following station
Palędzie towards Nowy Tomyśl	PKM2	Poznań Górczyn towards Września
Location
- Location within Poland Location within Greater Poland Voivodeship

Poznań Junikowo railway station is a railway station serving the south west of the city of Poznań, in the Greater Poland Voivodeship, Poland. The station opened in 2007 and is located on the Warsaw–Kunowice railway. The train services are operated by Polregio and Greater Poland Railways. At the station there is also a small freight yard for trains serving businesses in the area.

The station was built to replace a former station, about 1 km east of the site of the current station.

== Train services ==
The station is served by the following service(s):

- Regional services (R) Zielona Gora - Zbaszynek - Zbąszyn - Opalenica - Poznan
- Regional services (KW) Zbaszynek - Zbąszyn - Opalenica - Poznan

== Bus and tram services ==
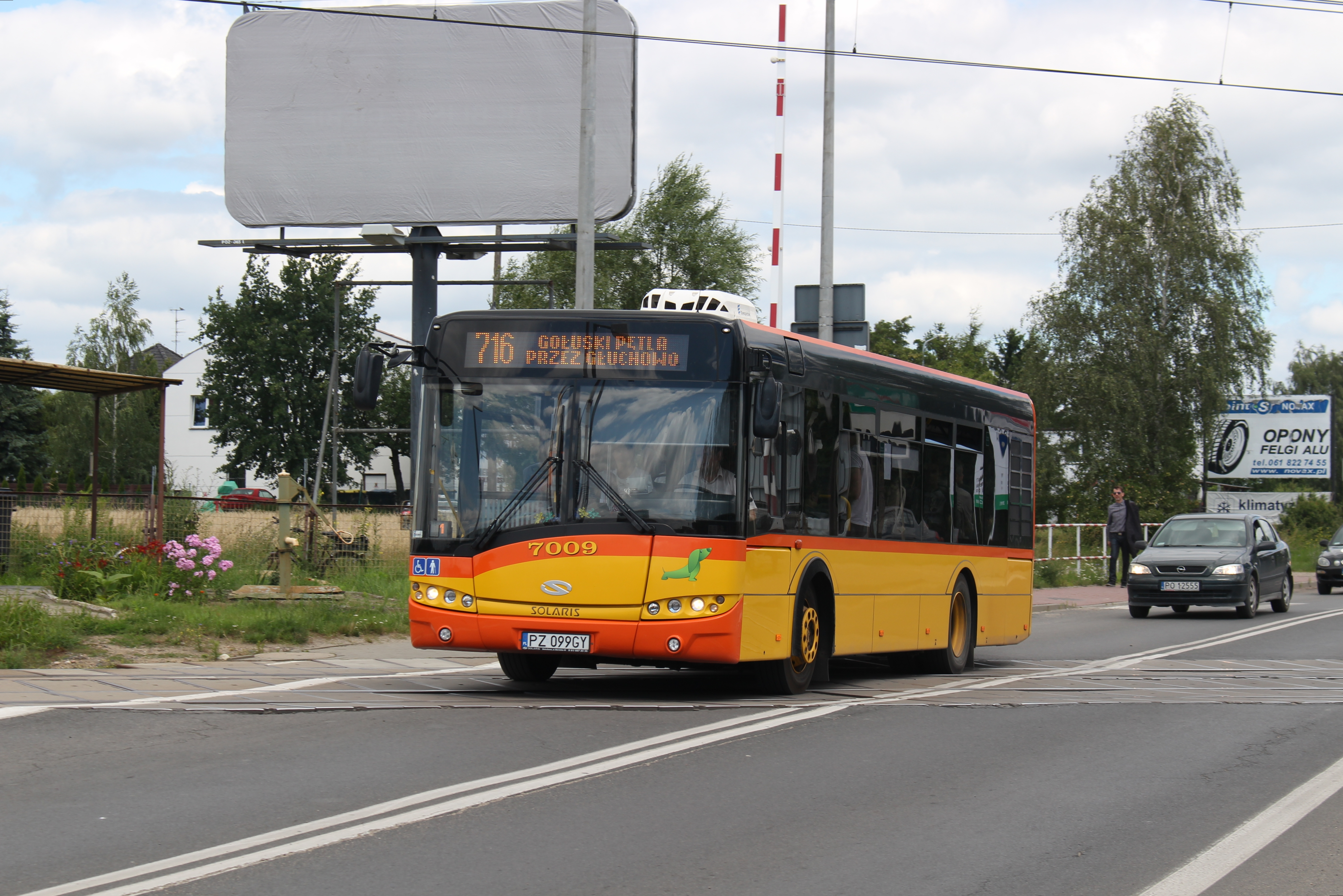
A bus passing the station

Bus service 716 stops at the station. Other bus and tram services operate from Junikowo terminus, about 800 metres north of the station.
