= Poznań Górczyn railway station =

Railway station in Poznań, Poland

Coordinates: 52.3800°N 16.8783°E

Poznań Górczyn
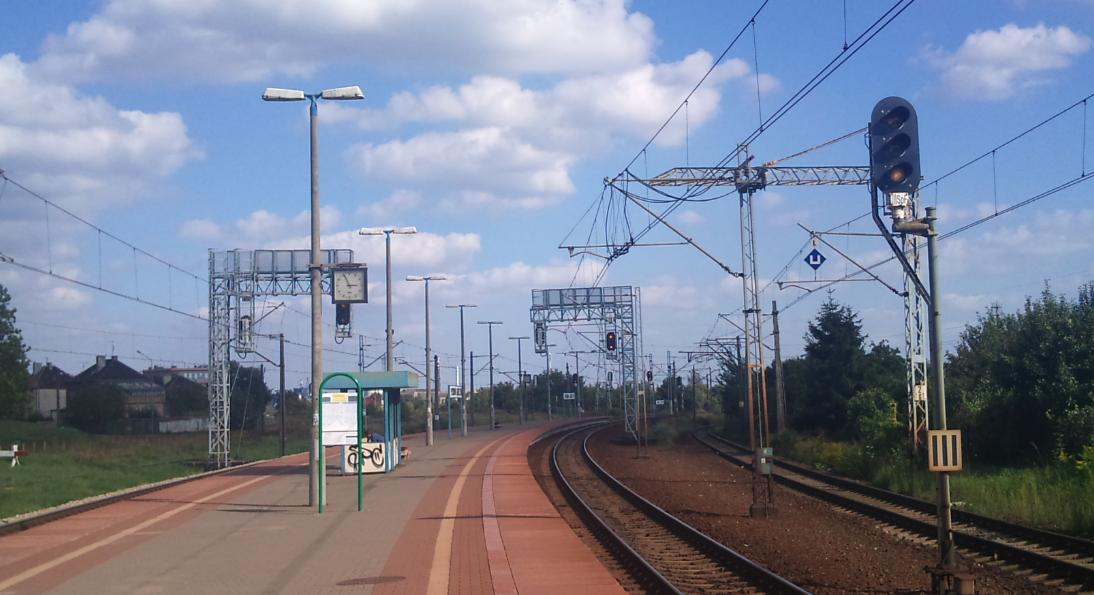
- Poznań Górczyn railway station

General information
- Location: Poznań, Greater Poland Voivodeship; Poland
- System: Railway Station
- Operator: Polregio; Greater Poland Railways
- Line: Warsaw–Kunowice railway
- Platforms: 2
- Tracks: 4

History
- Opened: 1870; 156 years ago

Services
Preceding station	KW	Following station
Poznań Główny Terminus	Poznań - Zbąszynek	Poznań Junikowo towards Zbąszynek
Preceding station	Poznań Metropolitan Railway	Following station
Poznań Junikowo towards Nowy Tomyśl	PKM2	Poznań Główny railway station towards Września
Location
- Location within Poland Location within Greater Poland Voivodeship

Poznań Górczyn railway station is a railway station serving the south west of the city of Poznań, in the Greater Poland Voivodeship, Poland. The station opened in 1870 and is located on the Warsaw–Kunowice railway. The train services are operated by Polregio and Greater Poland Railways. From this station there is also a line used by freight trains which joins the Kluczbork–Poznań railway.

The station opened as Poznań Święty Łazarz and underwent modernisation in 1976.

== Train services ==
The station is served by the following service(s):

- Regional services (R) Zielona Gora - Zbaszynek - Zbąszyn - Opalenica - Poznan
- Regional services (KW) Zbaszynek - Zbąszyn - Opalenica - Poznan

== Tram services ==
- 3 (Górczyn - Poznań Główny - Rondo Rataje - Rondo Śródka - Male Garbary - Armii Poznań - Wilczak)
- 5 (Górczyn - Poznań Główny - City Centre - Os. Lecha - Zegrze - Stomil)
- 8 (Górczyn - Poznań Główny - Male Garbary - Rondo Śródka - Miłostowo)
- 14 (Górczyn - Poznań Główny - Os. Sobieskiego)

== Bus services ==
- 49
- 50
- 63
- 75
- 80
- 82
- 93
- 610
- 614
- 616
- 701
- 702
- 703
- 704
- 710
