= Zabrzezie =

- Village
- Location within Poland
- Coordinates: 51°14′N 19°8′E
- Country: Poland
- Voivodeship: Łódź
- County: Pajęczno
- Gmina: Rząśnia

Zabrzezie [zaˈbʐɛʑɛ] was a village in the administrative district of Gmina Rząśnia, within Pajęczno County, Łódź Voivodeship, in central Poland. It lay approximately 7 km (4 mi) east of Rząśnia, 14 km (9 mi) north-east of Pajęczno, and 66 km (41 mi) south of the regional capital Łódź.

The village was destroyed following the start of mining operations at the Szczerców field of the Bełchatów Coal Mine in 2002.
