= Kiedosy =

- Village
- Location within Poland
- Coordinates: 51°4′N 18°47′E
- Country: Poland
- Voivodeship: Łódź
- County: Pajęczno
- Gmina: Działoszyn
- Elevation: 205 m (673 ft)

Kiedosy [kʲɛˈdɔsɨ] is a village in the administrative district of Gmina Działoszyn, within Pajęczno County, Łódź Voivodeship, in central Poland.
