= Broszęcin-Kolonia =

Village in Gmina Rząśnia, Poland

- Village
- Location within Poland
- Coordinates: 51°15′52″N 19°5′6″E
- Country: Poland
- Voivodeship: Łódź
- County: Pajęczno
- Gmina: Rząśnia

Broszęcin-Kolonia [brɔˈʂɛnt͡ɕin kɔˈlɔɲa] is a village in the administrative district of Gmina Rząśnia, within Pajęczno County, Łódź Voivodeship, in central Poland.
