= Zmyślona, Pajęczno County =

Zmyślona
- Village
- Location within Poland
- Coordinates: 51°13′52″N 18°48′10″E
- Country: Poland
- Voivodeship: Łódź
- County: Pajęczno
- Gmina: Siemkowice
- Population: 250

Zmyślona [zmɨˈɕlɔna] is a village in the administrative district of Gmina Siemkowice, within Pajęczno County, Łódź Voivodeship, in central Poland.
