= Stróża, Pajęczno County =

Stróża
- Village
- Location within Poland
- Coordinates: 51°13′N 19°7′E
- Country: Poland
- Voivodeship: Łódź
- County: Pajęczno
- Gmina: Rząśnia
- Population: 380
- Website: http://www.czarny.vgh.pl

Stróża [ˈstruʐa] is a village in the administrative district of Gmina Rząśnia, within Pajęczno County, Łódź Voivodeship, in central Poland.
