= Kolonia Chorzew =

- Village
- Location within Poland
- Coordinates: 51°12′38″N 18°57′24″E
- Country: Poland
- Voivodeship: Łódź
- County: Pajęczno
- Gmina: Kiełczygłów
- Population: 280

Kolonia Chorzew [kɔˈlɔɲa ˈxɔʐɛf] is a village in the administrative district of Gmina Kiełczygłów, within Pajęczno County, Łódź Voivodeship, in central Poland.
