= Wójtostwo, Pajęczno County =

Wójtostwo
- Village
- Location within Poland
- Coordinates: 51°08′54″N 18°52′34″E
- Country: Poland
- Voivodeship: Łódź
- County: Pajęczno
- Gmina: Działoszyn

Wójtostwo [vui̯ˈtɔstfɔ] is a village in the administrative district of Gmina Działoszyn, within Pajęczno County, Łódź Voivodeship, in central Poland.
