= Suchowola, Łódź Voivodeship =

Suchowola
- Village
- Location within Poland
- Coordinates: 51°11′39″N 19°3′43″E
- Country: Poland
- Voivodeship: Łódź
- County: Pajęczno
- Gmina: Rząśnia

Suchowola [suxɔˈvɔla] is a village in the administrative district of Gmina Rząśnia, within Pajęczno County, Łódź Voivodeship, in central Poland.
