= Radoszewice, Łódź Voivodeship =

Radoszewice
- Village
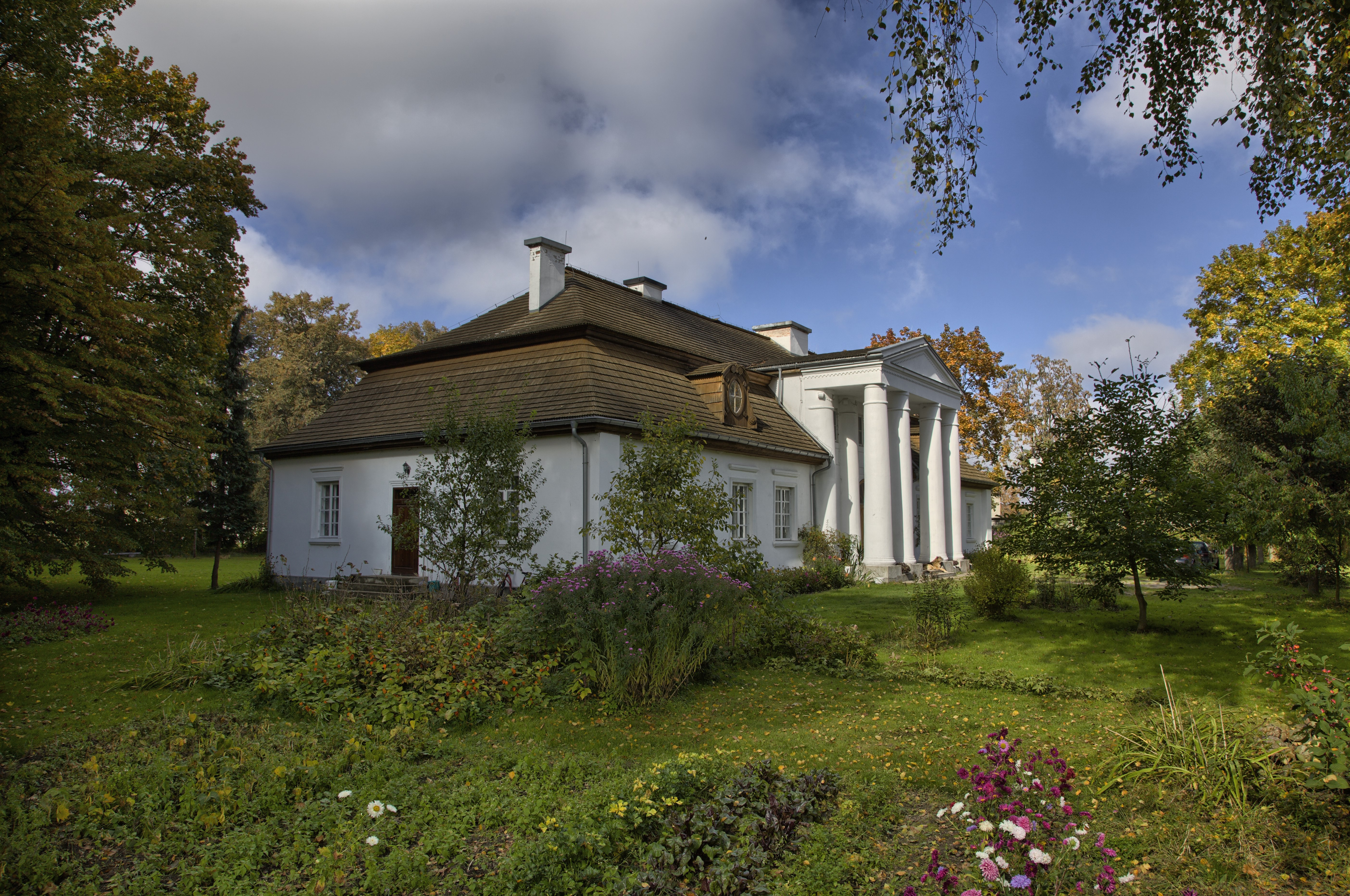

- Location within Poland
- Coordinates: 51°14′57″N 18°50′10″E
- Country: Poland
- Voivodeship: Łódź
- County: Pajęczno
- Gmina: Siemkowice

Radoszewice [radɔʂɛˈvit͡sɛ] is a village in the administrative district of Gmina Siemkowice, within Pajęczno County, Łódź Voivodeship, in central Poland.
