= Zamoście-Kolonia =

- Village
- Location within Poland
- Coordinates: 51°8′1″N 19°11′5″E
- Country: Poland
- Voivodeship: Łódź
- County: Pajęczno
- Gmina: Strzelce Wielkie

Zamoście-Kolonia (Polish pronunciation: [zaˈmɔɕt͡ɕɛ kɔˈlɔɲa]) is a village in the administrative district of Gmina Strzelce Wielkie, within Pajęczno County, Łódź Voivodeship, in central Poland.
