= Zamoście-Wieś =

- Village
- Location within Poland
- Coordinates: 51°8′14″N 19°10′25″E
- Country: Poland
- Voivodeship: Łódź
- County: Pajęczno
- Gmina: Strzelce Wielkie

Zamoście-Wieś (Polish pronunciation: [zaˈmɔɕt͡ɕɛ ˈvjɛɕ]) is a village in the administrative district of Gmina Strzelce Wielkie, within Pajęczno County, Łódź Voivodeship, in central Poland.
