= Wola Jankowska =

- Village
- Location within Poland
- Coordinates: 51°06′19″N 19°05′48″E
- Country: Poland
- Voivodeship: Łódź
- County: Pajęczno
- Gmina: Strzelce Wielkie

Wola Jankowska [ˈvɔla jaŋˈkɔfska] is a village in the administrative district of Gmina Strzelce Wielkie, within Pajęczno County, Łódź Voivodeship, in central Poland.
