= Młynki, Pajęczno County =

Młynki
- Village
- Location within Poland
- Coordinates: 51°05′10″N 18°48′20″E
- Country: Poland
- Voivodeship: Łódź
- County: Pajęczno
- Gmina: Działoszyn

Młynki [ˈmwɨŋki] is a village in the administrative district of Gmina Działoszyn, within Pajęczno County, Łódź Voivodeship, in central Poland.
