= Zalesiaki-Pieńki =

- Village
- Location within Poland
- Coordinates: 51°4′17″N 18°53′14″E
- Country: Poland
- Voivodeship: Łódź
- County: Pajęczno
- Gmina: Działoszyn
- Population: 70

Zalesiaki-Pieńki [zalɛˈɕaki ˈpjɛɲki] is a village in the administrative district of Gmina Działoszyn, within Pajęczno County, Łódź Voivodeship, in central Poland.
