= Chruścińskie =

- Village
- Location within Poland
- Coordinates: 51°12′N 19°1′E
- Country: Poland
- Voivodeship: Łódź
- County: Pajęczno
- Gmina: Kiełczygłów
- Population: 100

Chruścińskie [xruɕˈt͡ɕiɲskʲɛ] is a village in the administrative district of Gmina Kiełczygłów, within Pajęczno County, Łódź Voivodeship, in central Poland.
