= Będków =

Będków may refer to the following places:

- Będków, Pajęczno County in Łódź Voivodeship (central Poland)
- Będków, Sieradz County in Łódź Voivodeship (central Poland)
- Będków, Gmina Będków, Tomaszów County in Łódź Voivodeship (central Poland)
