= Bobrowniki, Pajęczno County =

Bobrowniki
- Village
- Location within Poland
- Coordinates: 51°6′10″N 18°46′42″E
- Country: Poland
- Voivodeship: Łódź
- County: Pajęczno
- Gmina: Działoszyn

Bobrowniki [bɔbrɔvˈniki] is a village in the administrative district of Gmina Działoszyn, within Pajęczno County, Łódź Voivodeship, in central Poland.
