= Wistka, Łódź Voivodeship =

Wistka
- Village
- Location within Poland
- Coordinates: 51°9′N 19°5′E
- Country: Poland
- Voivodeship: Łódź
- County: Pajęczno
- Gmina: Strzelce Wielkie

Wistka [ˈvistka] is a village in the administrative district of Gmina Strzelce Wielkie, within Pajęczno County, Łódź Voivodeship, in central Poland.
