= Wola Wiewiecka =

- Village
- Location within Poland
- Coordinates: 51°7′N 19°16′E
- Country: Poland
- Voivodeship: Łódź
- County: Pajęczno
- Gmina: Strzelce Wielkie

Wola Wiewiecka [ˈvɔla vjɛˈvjɛt͡ska] is a village in the administrative district of Gmina Strzelce Wielkie, within Pajęczno County, Łódź Voivodeship, in central Poland.
