= Biała, Pajęczno County =

Biała
- Village
- Location within Poland
- Coordinates: 51°11′3″N 19°1′37″E
- Country: Poland
- Voivodeship: Łódź
- County: Pajęczno
- Gmina: Rząśnia
- Population: 960

Biała [ˈbjawa], also known as Biała Szlachecka ("aristocratic Biała") is a village in the administrative district of Gmina Rząśnia, within Pajęczno County, Łódź Voivodeship, in central Poland.

The village is composed of several hamlets, including Biała Peciaki, Biała Ameryka, Biała Działy.

== Monuments ==
The village has a wooden parish church dating from the second half of the sixteenth century, dedicated to Saint John the Baptist. This church was initially located in Wola Grzymalina, a now-extant neighboring village. However, due to the extension of the coal mine around Bełchatów, the largest open cut coal mine in Poland, the church was transported to its current location in 1981–1982. It had been inscribed in the national register of historic monuments of Poland in 1967. Restoration works were performed both on the interior walls, which still display an original mural painting of the "danse macabre", as well as on the wooden altar.

Remnants of a fortified house, dating from the fifteenth/sixteenth century, can be found on the land of the current elementary school.

== Notable residents ==
Marcin Bielski, Polish chronicler and poet of the sixteenth century, considered the "father of Polish prose", was born in Biała to an aristocratic family with land holdings here, hence his surname.

His birth-house was depicted by Napoleon Orda in his Album widoków historycznych Polski (Album of Polish Historical Landscapes) as drawing number 28.
