= Sadowiec-Niwa =

- Village
- Location within Poland
- Coordinates: 51°8′52″N 18°53′39″E
- Country: Poland
- Voivodeship: Łódź
- County: Pajęczno
- Gmina: Działoszyn
- Population: 60

Sadowiec-Niwa [saˈdɔvjɛt͡s ˈniva] is a village in the administrative district of Gmina Działoszyn, within Pajęczno County, Łódź Voivodeship, in central Poland.
