= Pieńki Laskowskie =

- Village
- Location within Poland
- Coordinates: 51°12′30″N 18°48′18″E
- Country: Poland
- Voivodeship: Łódź
- County: Pajęczno
- Gmina: Siemkowice

Pieńki Laskowskie [ˈpjɛɲki lasˈkɔfskʲɛ] is a village in the administrative district of Gmina Siemkowice, within Pajęczno County, Łódź Voivodeship, in central Poland.
