= Osina Mała =

Osina Mała may refer to the following places in Poland:

- Osina Mała, Lower Silesian Voivodeship (south-west Poland)
- Osina Mała, Łódź Voivodeship (central Poland)
