= Otok, Pajęczno County =

Otok
- Settlement
- Location within Poland
- Coordinates: 51°14′51″N 19°00′57″E
- Country: Poland
- Voivodeship: Łódź
- County: Pajęczno
- Gmina: Kiełczygłów

Otok [ˈɔtɔk] is a settlement in the administrative district of Gmina Kiełczygłów, within Pajęczno County, Łódź Voivodeship, in central Poland.
