= Sadowiec-Wrzosy =

- Village
- Location within Poland
- Coordinates: 51°7′57″N 18°53′34″E
- Country: Poland
- Voivodeship: Łódź
- County: Pajęczno
- Gmina: Działoszyn
- Population: 170

Sadowiec-Wrzosy [saˈdɔvjɛt͡s ˈvʐɔsɨ] is a village in the administrative district of Gmina Działoszyn, within Pajęczno County, Łódź Voivodeship, in central Poland.
