= Szczepany, Łódź Voivodeship =

Szczepany
- Village
- Location within Poland
- Coordinates: 51°4′43″N 18°47′58″E
- Country: Poland
- Voivodeship: Łódź
- County: Pajęczno
- Gmina: Działoszyn

Szczepany [ʂt͡ʂɛˈpanɨ] is a village in the administrative district of Gmina Działoszyn, within Pajęczno County, Łódź Voivodeship, in central Poland.
