= Pomiary =

- Village
- Location within Poland
- Coordinates: 51°7′54″N 19°12′56″E
- Country: Poland
- Voivodeship: Łódź
- County: Pajęczno
- Gmina: Strzelce Wielkie
- Population: 210

Pomiary [pɔˈmjarɨ] is a village in the administrative district of Gmina Strzelce Wielkie, within Pajęczno County, Łódź Voivodeship, in central Poland.
