= Pantaleon Szyndler =

Polish painter (1846–1905)

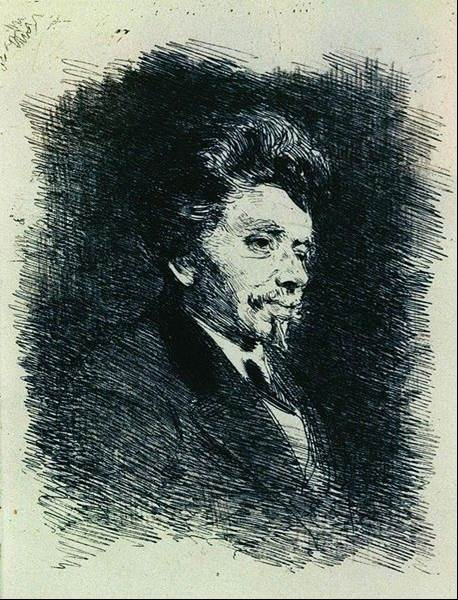
- Portrait by Ilya Repin, date unknown
- Born: 26 July 1846; Lipie, Pajęczno County, Poland
- Died: 31 January 1905 (aged 58); Warsaw
- Education: School of Fine Arts, Warsaw; Academy of Fine Arts, Munich (1870-73); Accademia di San Luca, Rome École des Beaux-Arts, Paris
- Known for: Painter

Pantaleon Józef Szyndler or Szendler (26 July 1846, Lipie – 31 January 1905, Warsaw) was a Polish painter in the Academic style. He is primarily known for nudes, religious works and Orientalist paintings. Some of his canvases were inspired by Polish Romantic poetry and he was a close friend of Cyprian Norwid.

== Biography ==
His first art lessons were at the School of Fine Arts in Warsaw with Rafał Hadziewicz. With a scholarship from the "Society for the Encouragement of Fine Arts", he was able to continue his studies abroad.

From 1870 to 1873, he was enrolled at the Academy of Fine Arts, Munich, under the direction of Alexander Strähuber (1814–1882), Hermann Anschütz (1802–1880) and Otto Seitz (1846–1912), then went to the Accademia di San Luca in Rome, where he worked with Luigi Cochetti (1802–1884); finishing in Paris at the École des Beaux-Arts with Alexandre Cabanel (1823–1889). While there, he exhibited at the Salon.

After returning to Poland, he settled in Warsaw and lived there from 1885 to 1894. He then moved to Częstochowa, where he did work at Jasna Góra Monastery and operated his own art school.

His painting of Eve won honorable mention at the Exposition Universelle (1889), but created a controversy in Poland. Some critics felt that it was too bold, making the "mother of mankind" look like a woman in a boudoir, while others simply said that it did not match their ideas of what Eve would have looked like. The magazine Biesiada Literacka went so far as to complain that her feet were too small.

In 1895, he made an extended trip to Podolia and Crimea. He returned to Warsaw in 1902 and died there three years later.

== Selected paintings ==
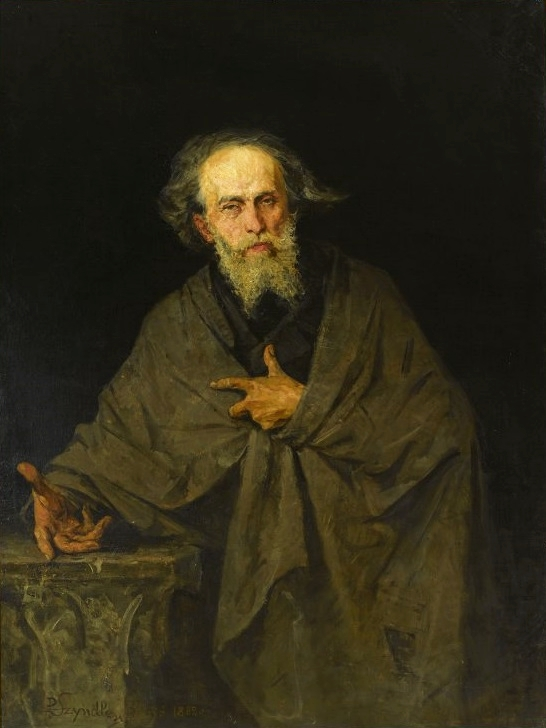
Portrait of
Cyprian Norwid

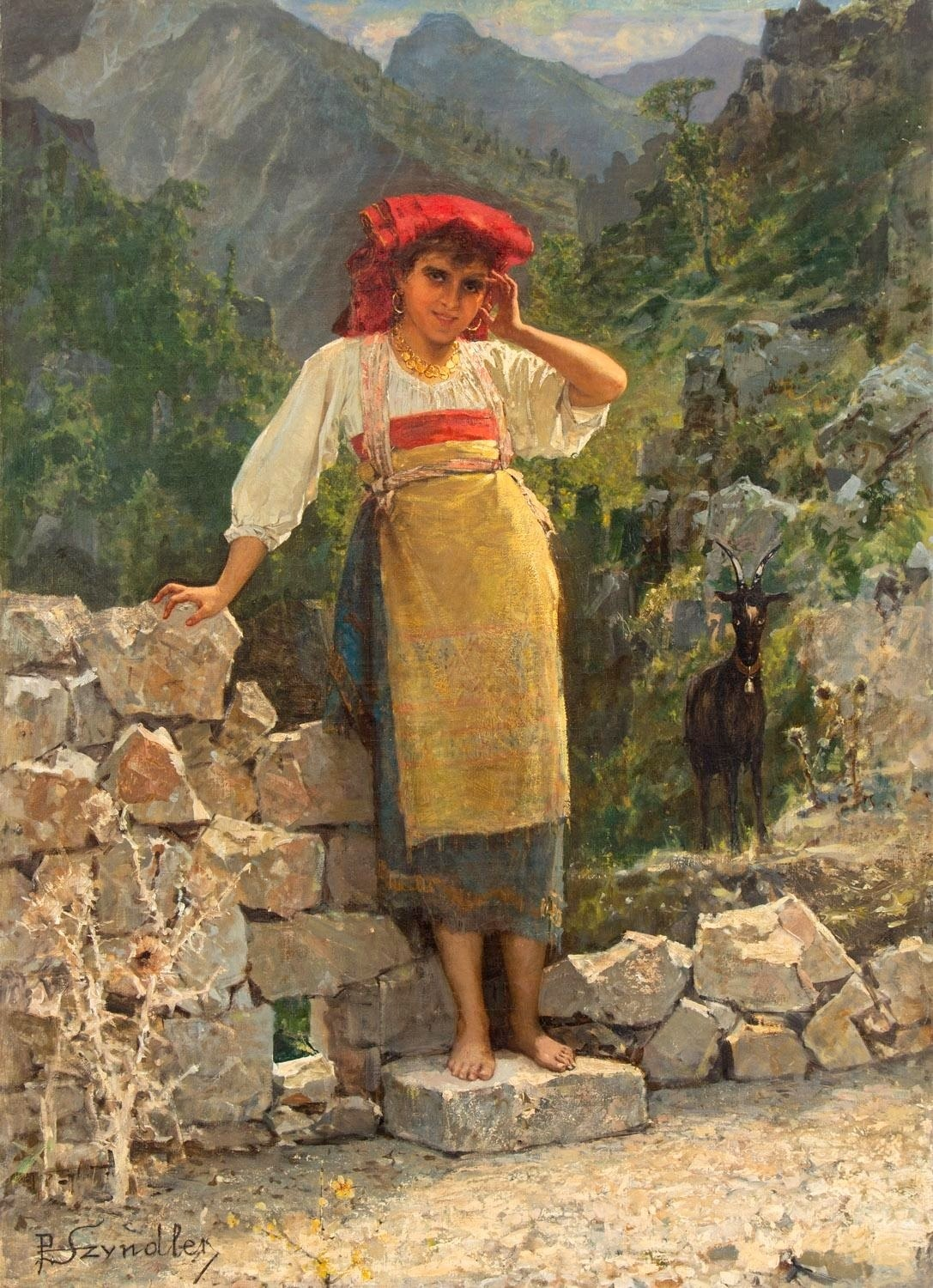
The Happy Shepherdess

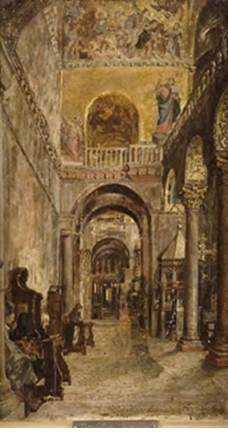
The Interior of
Saint Mark's

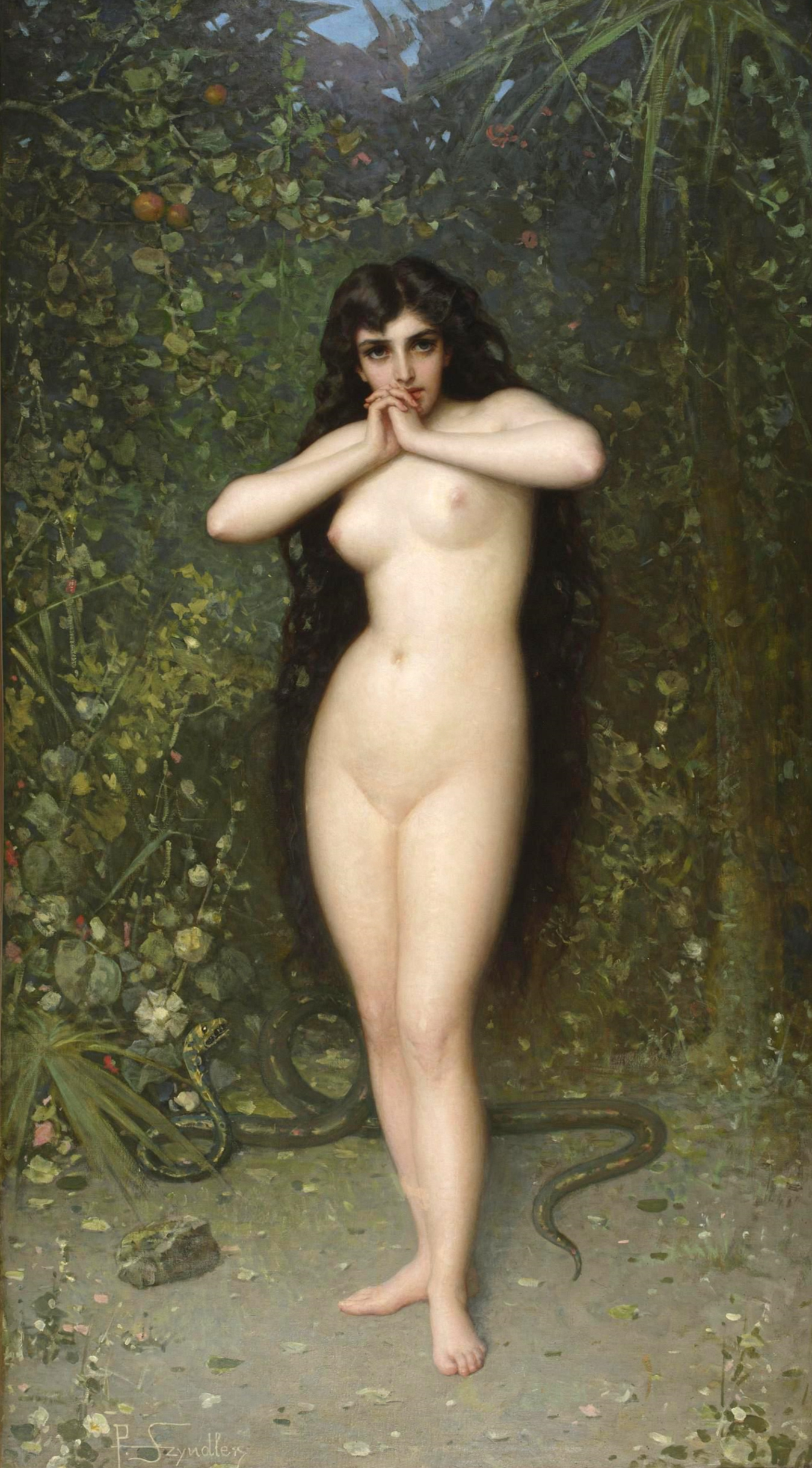
Eve (Temptation)

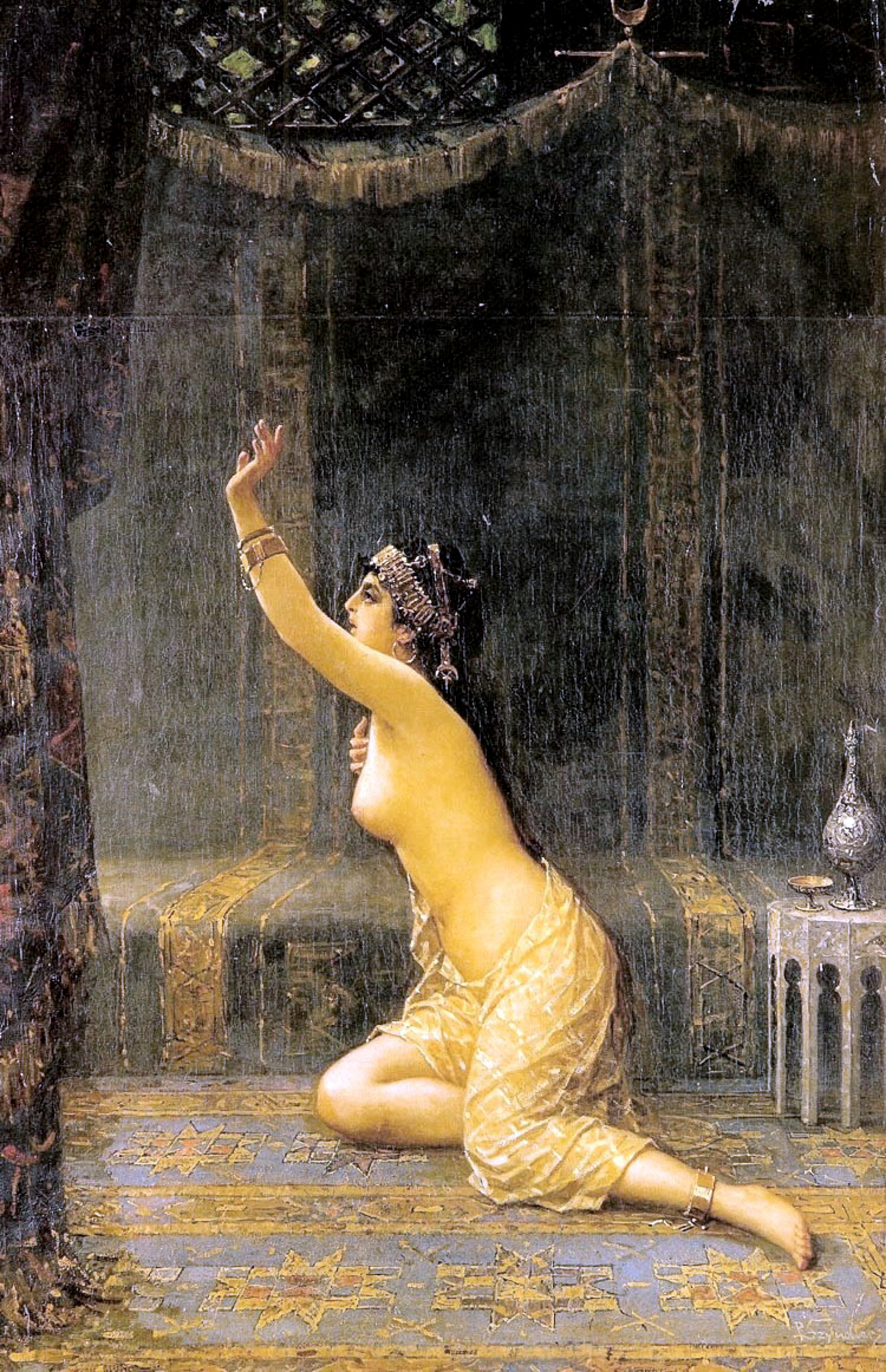
Slave Woman
