= Bugaj Radoszewicki =

- Village
- Location within Poland
- Coordinates: 51°13′0″N 18°47′34″E
- Country: Poland
- Voivodeship: Łódź
- County: Pajęczno
- Gmina: Siemkowice
- Population: 70

Bugaj Radoszewicki [ˈbuɡai̯ radɔʂɛˈvit͡ski] is a village in the administrative district of Gmina Siemkowice, within Pajęczno County, Łódź Voivodeship, in central Poland.
