= Beresie Małe =

- Village
- Location within Poland
- Coordinates: 51°15′N 18°57′E
- Country: Poland
- Voivodeship: Łódź
- County: Pajęczno
- Gmina: Kiełczygłów

Beresie Małe [bɛˈrɛɕɛ ˈmawɛ] is a village in the administrative district of Gmina Kiełczygłów, within Pajęczno County, Łódź Voivodeship, in central Poland.
