= Trębaczew, Pajęczno County =

Trębaczew
- Village
- Location within Poland
- Coordinates: 51°7′51″N 18°55′27″E
- Country: Poland
- Voivodeship: Łódź
- County: Pajęczno
- Gmina: Działoszyn
- Population: 2,387
- Website: http://www.trebaczew.com.pl/

Trębaczew [trɛmˈbat͡ʂɛf] is a village in the administrative district of Gmina Działoszyn, within Pajęczno County, Łódź Voivodeship, in central Poland.
