= Skąpa =

- Village
- Location within Poland
- Coordinates: 51°9′47″N 19°7′55″E
- Country: Poland
- Voivodeship: Łódź
- County: Pajęczno
- Gmina: Strzelce Wielkie
- Population: 200

Skąpa [ˈskɔmpa] is a village in the administrative district of Gmina Strzelce Wielkie, within Pajęczno County, Łódź Voivodeship, in central Poland.
