= Draby =

- Village
- Location within Poland
- Coordinates: 51°5′1″N 18°48′23″E
- Country: Poland
- Voivodeship: Łódź
- County: Pajęczno
- Gmina: Działoszyn

Draby [ˈdrabɨ] is a village in the administrative district of Gmina Działoszyn, within Pajęczno County, Łódź Voivodeship, in central Poland.
