= Szczyty, Łódź Voivodeship =

Szczyty
- Village
- Location within Poland
- Coordinates: 51°9′N 18°51′E
- Country: Poland
- Voivodeship: Łódź
- County: Pajęczno
- Gmina: Działoszyn

Szczyty [ˈʂt͡ʂɨtɨ] is a village in the administrative district of Gmina Działoszyn, within Pajęczno County, Łódź Voivodeship, in central Poland.
