= Gmina Strzelce Wielkie =

Gmina Strzelce Wielkie Strzelce Wielkie Commune
- Gmina
- Coat of arms
- Interactive map of Gmina Strzelce Wielkie
- Coordinates (Strzelce Wielkie): 51°8′22″N 19°8′42″E
- Country: Poland
- Voivodeship: Łódź
- County: Pajęczno
- Seat: Strzelce Wielkie

Area
  - Total: 77.66 km^{2} (29.98 sq mi)

Population (2006)
  - Total: 4,883
  - Density: 62.88/km^{2} (162.8/sq mi)
- Website: http://www.gminy.pl/Strzelce_Wielkie

Gmina Strzelce Wielkie is a rural gmina (administrative district) in Pajęczno County, Łódź Voivodeship, in central Poland. Its seat is the village of Strzelce Wielkie, which lies approximately 11 kilometres (7 mi) east of Pajęczno and 75 km (47 mi) south of the regional capital Łódź.

The gmina covers an area of 77.66 square kilometres (30.0 sq mi), and as of 2006 its total population is 4,883.

== Villages ==
Gmina Strzelce Wielkie contains the villages and settlements of Antonina, Dębowiec Mały, Dębowiec Wielki, Górki, Marzęcice, Pomiary, Skąpa, Strzelce Wielkie, Wiewiec, Wistka, Wola Jankowska, Wola Wiewiecka, Zamoście-Kolonia and Zamoście-Wieś.

== Neighbouring gminas ==
Gmina Strzelce Wielkie is bordered by the gminas of Ładzice, Lgota Wielka, Nowa Brzeźnica, Pajęczno, Rząśnia and Sulmierzyce.
