= Brutus, Łódź Voivodeship =

Brutus
- Village
- Location within Poland
- Coordinates: 51°15′N 19°2′E
- Country: Poland
- Voivodeship: Łódź
- County: Pajęczno
- Gmina: Kiełczygłów

Brutus [ˈbrutus] is a village in the administrative district of Gmina Kiełczygłów, within Pajęczno County, Łódź Voivodeship, in central Poland.
