= Kije =

Kije may refer to the following:

- Lieutenant Kijé, a novella by Yury Tynyanov
- Lieutenant Kijé (film), a 1934 Soviet film
- Lieutenant Kijé, the film score and suite by Sergei Prokofiev
- Porośl-Kije in Podlaskie Voivodeship (north-east Poland)
- Kije, Pajęczno County in Łódź Voivodeship (central Poland)
- Kije, Sieradz County in Łódź Voivodeship (central Poland)
- Kije, Świętokrzyskie Voivodeship (south-central Poland)
- Kije, Lubusz Voivodeship (west Poland)
- Kije, Warmian-Masurian Voivodeship (north Poland)
- Kije, West Pomeranian Voivodeship (north-west Poland)
