= Bugaj, Pajęczno County =

Bugaj
- Village
- Location within Poland
- Coordinates: 51°8′50″N 18°50′6″E
- Country: Poland
- Voivodeship: Łódź
- County: Pajęczno
- Gmina: Działoszyn

Bugaj [ˈbuɡai̯] is a village in the administrative district of Gmina Działoszyn, within Pajęczno County, Łódź Voivodeship, in central Poland.
