= Mazaniec =

- Village
- Location within Poland
- Coordinates: 51°12′59″N 18°51′57″E
- Country: Poland
- Voivodeship: Łódź
- County: Pajęczno
- Gmina: Siemkowice
- Population: 80

Mazaniec [maˈzaɲɛt͡s] is a village in the administrative district of Gmina Siemkowice, within Pajęczno County, Łódź Voivodeship, in central Poland.
