= Dąbrowa, Gmina Kiełczygłów =

Dąbrowa
- Village
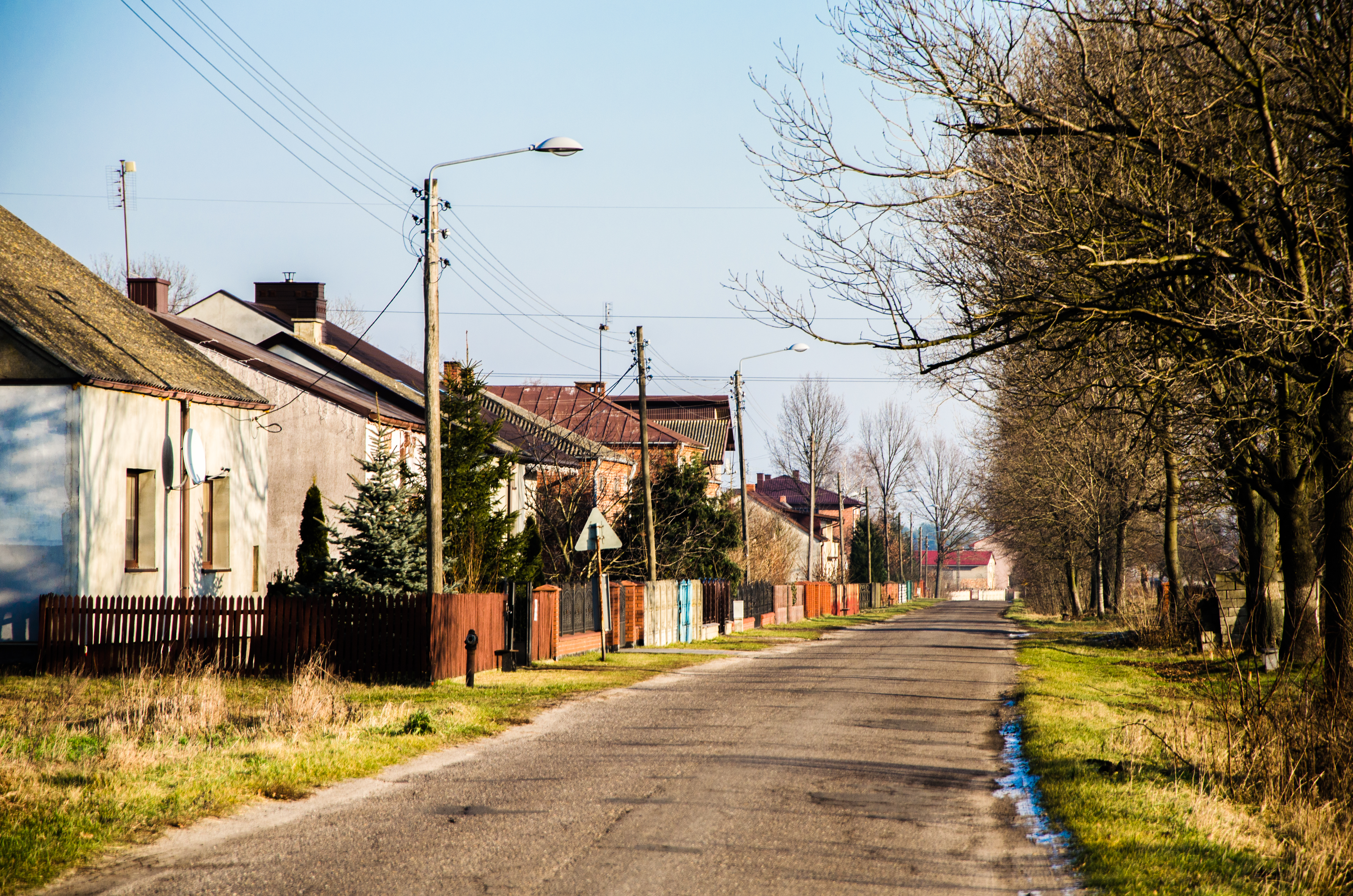
- Houses in Dąbrowa

- Location within Poland
- Coordinates: 51°15′24″N 18°54′53″E
- Country: Poland
- Voivodeship: Łódź
- County: Pajęczno
- Gmina: Kiełczygłów

Dąbrowa [dɔmˈbrɔva] is a village in the administrative district of Gmina Kiełczygłów, within Pajęczno County, Łódź Voivodeship, in central Poland.
