= Antonina, Pajęczno County =

Antonina
- Village
- Location within Poland
- Coordinates: 51°9′19″N 19°6′54″E
- Country: Poland
- Voivodeship: Łódź
- County: Pajęczno
- Gmina: Strzelce Wielkie

Antonina [antɔˈnina] is a village in the administrative district of Gmina Strzelce Wielkie, within Pajęczno County, Łódź Voivodeship, in central Poland.
