= Marcelin, Łódź Voivodeship =

Marcelin
- Village
- Location within Poland
- Coordinates: 51°17′N 19°3′E
- Country: Poland
- Voivodeship: Łódź
- County: Pajęczno
- Gmina: Rząśnia

Marcelin [marˈt͡sɛlin] is a village in the administrative district of Gmina Rząśnia, within Pajęczno County, Łódź Voivodeship, in central Poland.
