= Raciszyn =

- Village
- Location within Poland
- Coordinates: 51°6′N 18°52′E
- Country: Poland
- Voivodeship: Łódź
- County: Pajęczno
- Gmina: Działoszyn

Raciszyn [raˈt͡ɕiʂɨn] is a village in the administrative district of Gmina Działoszyn, within Pajęczno County, Łódź Voivodeship, in central Poland.
