= Kiełczygłówek =

Village in Gmina Kiełczygłów, Poland

- Village
- Location within Poland
- Coordinates: 51°16′44″N 18°54′49″E
- Country: Poland
- Voivodeship: Łódź
- County: Pajęczno
- Gmina: Kiełczygłów

Kiełczygłówek [kʲɛu̯t͡ʂɨˈɡwuvɛk] is a village in the administrative district of Gmina Kiełczygłów, within Pajęczno County, Łódź Voivodeship, central Poland.
