= Pierzyny Duże =

- Village
- Location within Poland
- Coordinates: 51°16′55″N 18°56′24″E
- Country: Poland
- Voivodeship: Łódź
- County: Pajęczno
- Gmina: Kiełczygłów
- Population: 120

Pierzyny Duże [pjɛˈʐɨnɨ ˈduʐɛ] is a village in the administrative district of Gmina Kiełczygłów, within Pajęczno County, Łódź Voivodeship, in central Poland.
