= Kolonia Lisowice =

- Village
- Location within Poland
- Coordinates: 51°5′35″N 18°49′58″E
- Country: Poland
- Voivodeship: Łódź
- County: Pajęczno
- Gmina: Działoszyn

Kolonia Lisowice [kɔˈlɔɲa lisɔˈvit͡sɛ] is a village in the administrative district of Gmina Działoszyn, within Pajęczno County, Łódź Voivodeship, in central Poland.
