= Dryganek Mały =

- Village
- Location within Poland
- Coordinates: 51°15′08″N 18°59′24″E
- Country: Poland
- Voivodeship: Łódź
- County: Pajęczno
- Gmina: Kiełczygłów

Dryganek Mały [drɨˈɡanɛk ˈmawɨ] is a village in the administrative district of Gmina Kiełczygłów, within Pajęczno County, Łódź Voivodeship, in central Poland.
