= Wiewiec =

- Village
- Location within Poland
- Coordinates: 51°8′N 19°14′E
- Country: Poland
- Voivodeship: Łódź
- County: Pajęczno
- Gmina: Strzelce Wielkie

Wiewiec [ˈvjɛvjɛt͡s] is a village in the administrative district of Gmina Strzelce Wielkie, within Pajęczno County, Łódź Voivodeship, in central Poland.
