= Studzienica, Łódź Voivodeship =

Studzienica
- Village
- Location within Poland
- Coordinates: 51°13′52″N 19°0′43″E
- Country: Poland
- Voivodeship: Łódź
- County: Pajęczno
- Gmina: Kiełczygłów

Studzienica [stud͡ʑɛˈnit͡sa] is a village in the administrative district of Gmina Kiełczygłów, within Pajęczno County, Łódź Voivodeship, in central Poland.
