= Tuchań =

- Village
- Location within Poland
- Coordinates: 51°13′11″N 18°56′51″E
- Country: Poland
- Voivodeship: Łódź
- County: Pajęczno
- Gmina: Kiełczygłów
- Population: 180

Tuchań [ˈtuxaɲ] is a village in the administrative district of Gmina Kiełczygłów, within Pajęczno County, Łódź Voivodeship, in central Poland.
