= Działoszyn =

Town in Łódź Voivodeship, Poland

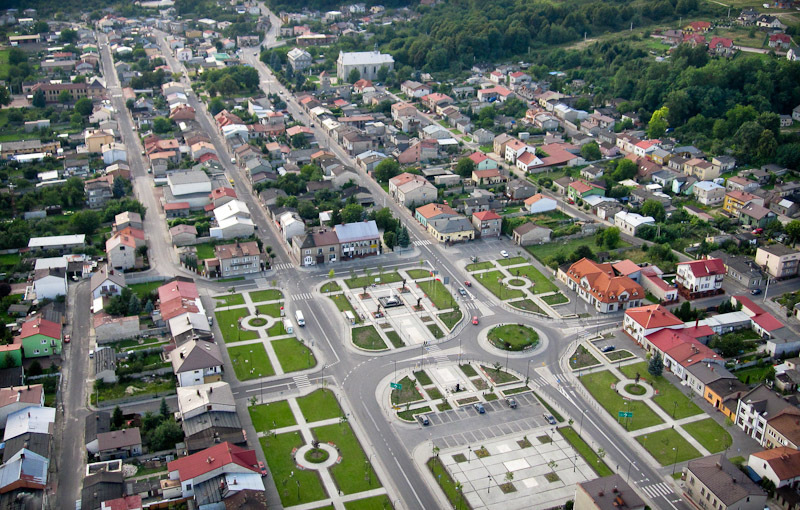
- Town centre

- Flag Coat of arms

- Location within Poland
- Coordinates: 51°7′4″N 18°52′12″E
- Country: Poland
- Voivodeship: Łódź
- County: Pajęczno
- Gmina: Działoszyn
- Established: 1412
- Town rights: 1412, 1994

Government
  - Mayor: Rafał Drab

Area
  - Total: 4.94 km^{2} (1.91 sq mi)

Population (31 December 2021)
  - Total: 6,741
  - Density: 1,360/km^{2} (3,530/sq mi)
- Time zone: UTC+1 (CET)
  - Summer (DST): UTC+2 (CEST)
- Postal code: 98-355
- Area code: +48 43
- Vehicle registration: EPJ
- Website: https://www.dzialoszyn.pl

Działoszyn [d͡ʑaˈwɔʂɨn] is a town in Pajęczno County, Łódź Voivodeship, in south-central Poland, with 5,627 inhabitants as of December 2021.

== History ==
Historical population
Year	Pop.
1921	3,985
2010	6,099

Działoszyn was granted town rights in 1421. It was a private town, administratively located in the Wieluń County in the Sieradz Voivodeship in the Greater Poland Province of the Kingdom of Poland.

During the German invasion of Poland at the beginning of World War II, Działoszyn was the site of heavy fights between the Poles and the Germans. The town was heavily bombed by the Germans, and most of its Jews fled to nearby Pajęczno, where they were subjected by the occupiers to forced labor. Eventually, the town's Jews were murdered by the occupiers in the Holocaust. Several Poles, who were either born or lived and worked in Działoszyn, were murdered by the Russians in the Katyn massacre in 1940. The German occupiers, renamed the town to Dilltal. In 1945, the German occupation ended, and the town's historic name was restored.

== Sports ==
The local football club is Warta Działoszyn. It competes in the lower leagues. It was the first club of retired Poland national football team player Robert Warzycha.

== Gallery ==
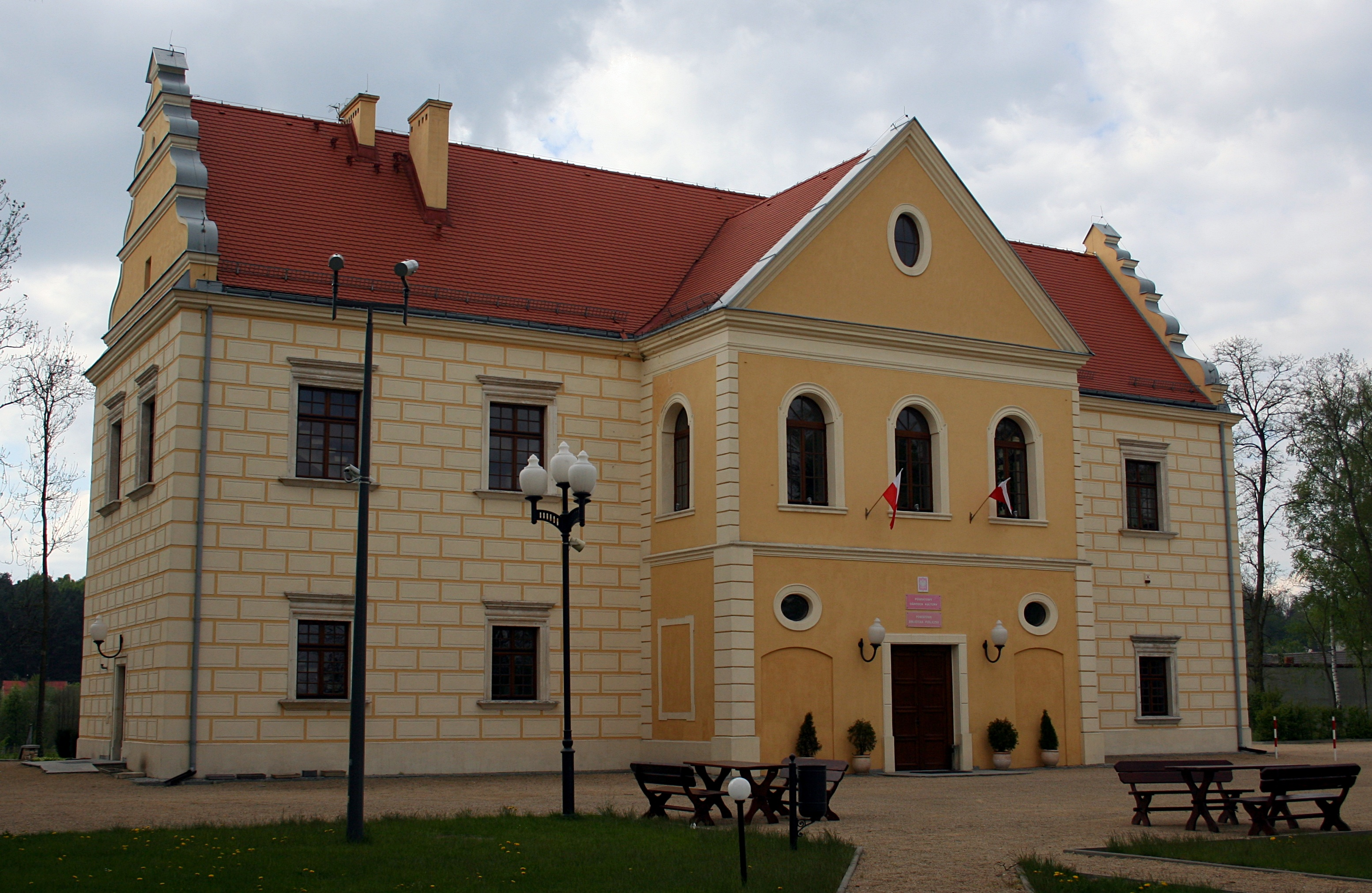
Męciński Palace

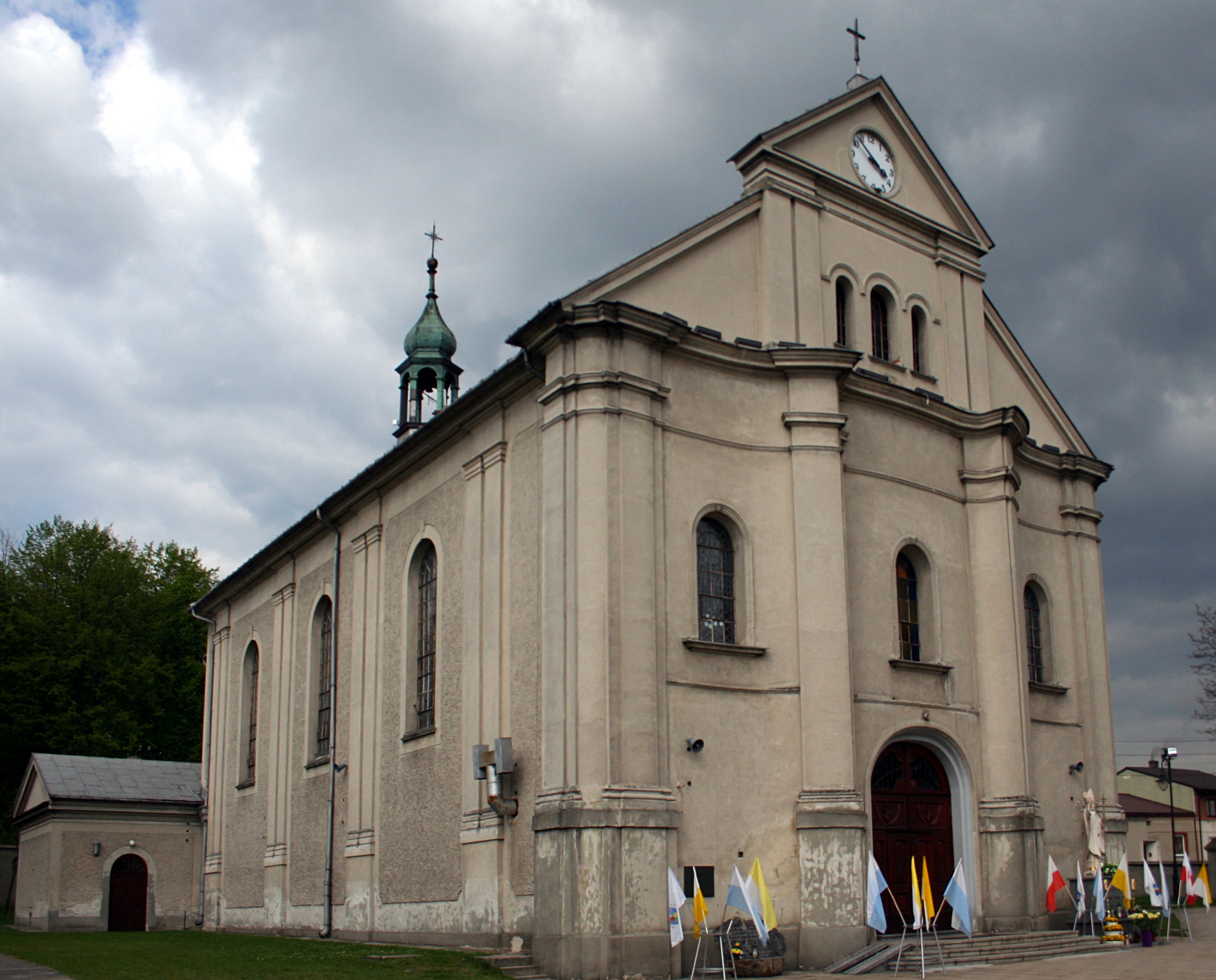
Baroque Saint Mary Magdalene church

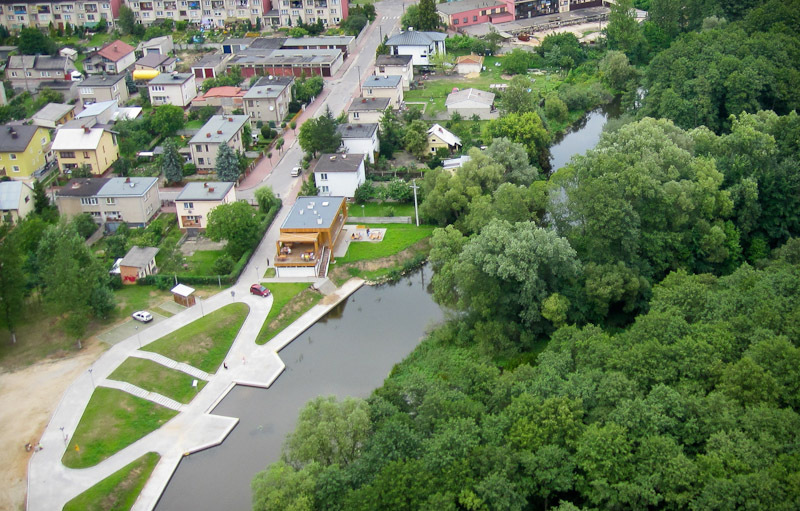
Kayak station

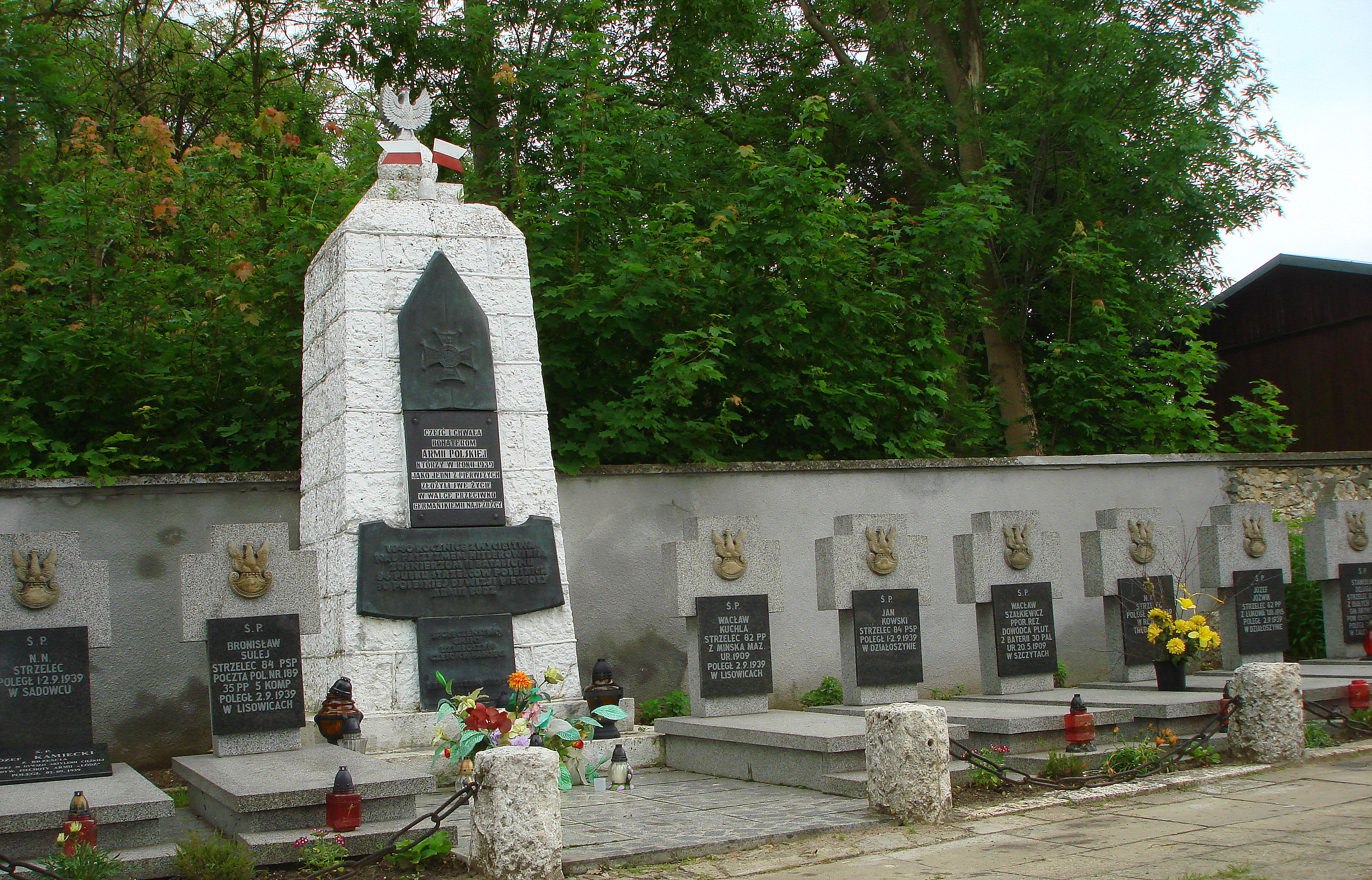
Cemetery of Polish soldiers killed during the German invasion in 1939
