= Mokre, Łódź Voivodeship =

Mokre
- Village
- Location within Poland
- Coordinates: 51°11′N 18°50′E
- Country: Poland
- Voivodeship: Łódź
- County: Pajęczno
- Gmina: Siemkowice

Mokre [ˈmɔkrɛ] is a village in the administrative district of Gmina Siemkowice, within Pajęczno County, Łódź Voivodeship, in central Poland.
