= Sadowiec, Łódź Voivodeship =

Sadowiec
- Village
- Location within Poland
- Coordinates: 51°8′29″N 18°53′40″E
- Country: Poland
- Voivodeship: Łódź
- County: Pajęczno
- Gmina: Działoszyn

Sadowiec [saˈdɔvjɛt͡s] is a village in the administrative district of Gmina Działoszyn, within Pajęczno County, Łódź Voivodeship, in central Poland.
