= Pierzyny Małe =

- Village
- Location within Poland
- Coordinates: 51°16′36″N 18°56′31″E
- Country: Poland
- Voivodeship: Łódź
- County: Pajęczno
- Gmina: Kiełczygłów

Pierzyny Małe [pjɛˈʐɨnɨ ˈmawɛ] is a village in the administrative district of Gmina Kiełczygłów, within Pajęczno County, Łódź Voivodeship, in central Poland.
