= Miętno, Łódź Voivodeship =

Village in Gmina Siemkowice, Poland

Miętno
- Village
- Location within Poland
- Coordinates: 51°11′04″N 18°51′11″E
- Country: Poland
- Voivodeship: Łódź
- County: Pajęczno
- Gmina: Siemkowice

Miętno [ˈmjɛntnɔ] is a village in the administrative district of Gmina Siemkowice, within Pajęczno County, Łódź Voivodeship, in central Poland.
