= Delfina, Łódź Voivodeship =

Delfina
- Village
- Location within Poland
- Coordinates: 51°15′N 18°55′E
- Country: Poland
- Voivodeship: Łódź
- County: Pajęczno
- Gmina: Siemkowice

Delfina [dɛlˈfina] is a village in the administrative district of Gmina Siemkowice, within Pajęczno County, Łódź Voivodeship, in central Poland.
