= Gmina Siemkowice =

Gmina Siemkowice Siemkowice Commune
- Gmina
- Coat of arms
- Interactive map of Gmina Siemkowice
- Coordinates (Siemkowice): 51°12′N 18°54′E
- Country: Poland
- Voivodeship: Łódź
- County: Pajęczno
- Seat: Siemkowice

Area
  - Total: 97.4 km^{2} (37.6 sq mi)

Population (2006)
  - Total: 5,016
  - Density: 51.5/km^{2} (133/sq mi)
- Website: http://www.gminasiemkowice.pl/

Gmina Siemkowice is a rural gmina (administrative district) in Pajęczno County, Łódź Voivodeship, in central Poland. Its seat is the village of Siemkowice, which lies approximately 9 kilometres (6 mi) north-west of Pajęczno and 76 km (47 mi) south-west of the regional capital Łódź.

The gmina covers an area of 97.4 square kilometres (37.6 sq mi), and as of 2006 its total population is 5,016.

== Villages ==
Gmina Siemkowice contains the villages and settlements of Borki, Bugaj Radoszewicki, Delfina, Ignaców, Katarzynopole, Kije, Kolonia Lipnik, Laski, Lipnik, Łukomierz, Mazaniec, Miętno, Mokre, Ożegów, Pieńki Laskowskie, Radoszewice, Siemkowice and Zmyślona.

== Neighbouring gminas ==
Gmina Siemkowice is bordered by the gminas of Działoszyn, Kiełczygłów, Osjaków, Pajęczno and Wierzchlas.
