= Gmina Kiełczygłów =

Gmina Kiełczygłów Kiełczygłów Commune
- Gmina
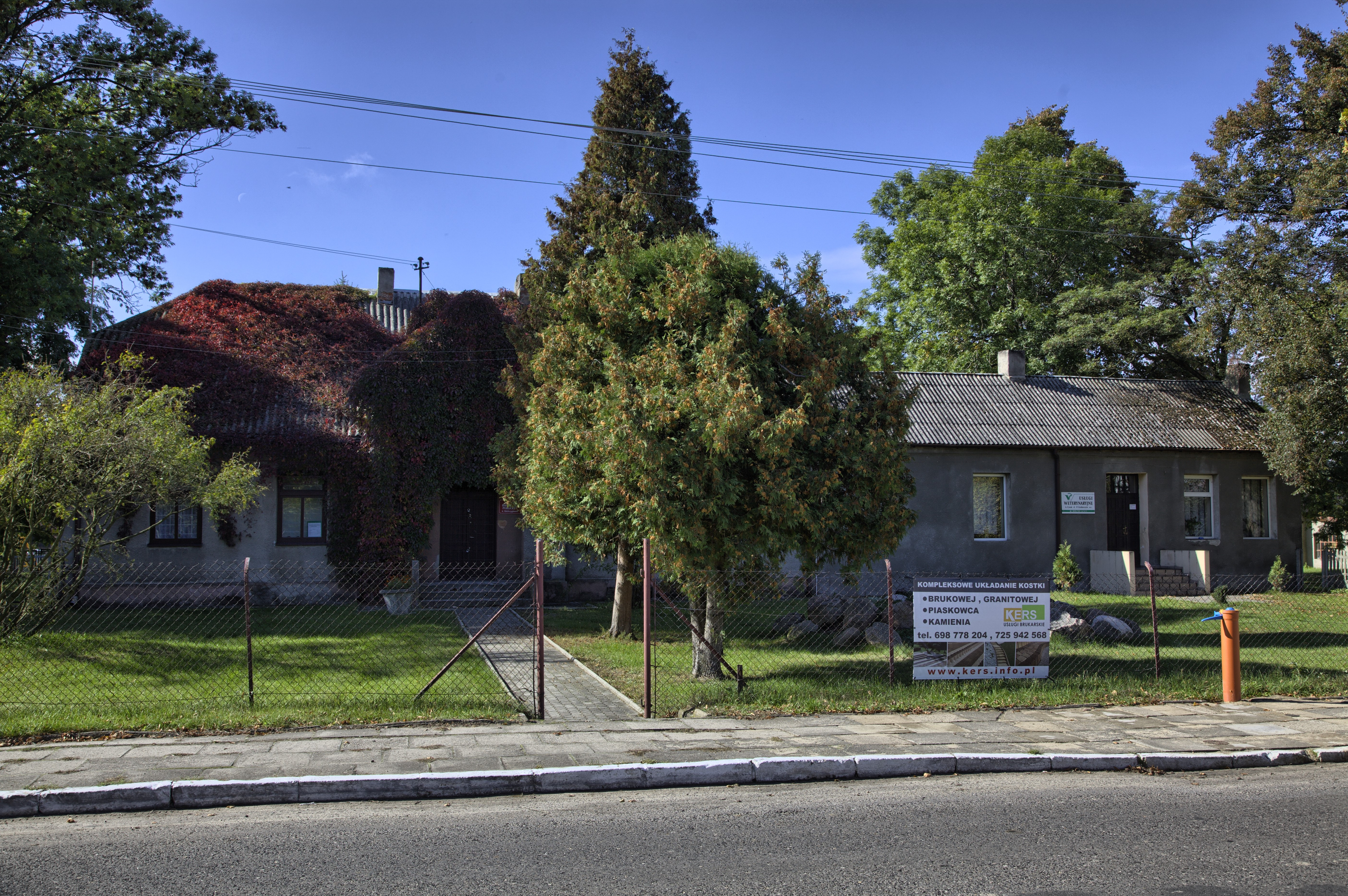

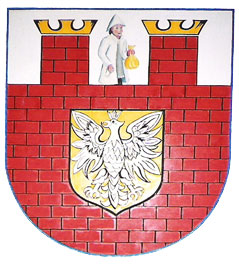
- Coat of arms
- Interactive map of Gmina Kiełczygłów
- Coordinates (Kiełczygłów): 51°14′21″N 18°59′4″E
- Country: Poland
- Voivodeship: Łódź
- County: Pajęczno
- Seat: Kiełczygłów

Area
  - Total: 90.01 km^{2} (34.75 sq mi)

Population (2006)
  - Total: 4,343
  - Density: 48.25/km^{2} (125.0/sq mi)
- Time zone: UTC+1 (CET)
  - Summer (DST): UTC+2 (CEST)
- Website: www.kielczyglow.pl

Gmina Kiełczygłów is a rural gmina (administrative district) in Pajęczno County, Łódź Voivodeship, in central Poland. Its seat is the village of Kiełczygłów, which lies approximately 10 kilometres (6 mi) north of Pajęczno and 70 km (43 mi) south-west of the regional capital Łódź.

The gmina covers an area of 90.01 square kilometres (34.8 sq mi), and as of 2006 its total population is 4,343.

== Villages ==
Gmina Kiełczygłów contains the villages and settlements of:

- Beresie Duże
- Beresie Małe
- Brutus
- Chorzew
- Chruścińskie
- Dąbrowa
- Dryganek Duży
- Dryganek Mały
- Glina Duża
- Glina Mała
- Gumnisko
- Huta
- Jaworznica
- Kiełczygłów
- Kiełczygłówek
- Kolonia Chorzew
- Kolonia Kiełczygłów
- Kule
- Kuszyna
- Ławiana
- Lipie
- Obrów
- Okupniki
- Osina Duża
- Osina Mała
- Otok
- Pierzyny Duże
- Pierzyny Małe
- Podrwinów
- Skoczylasy
- Studzienica
- Tuchań
- Wyręba

== Neighbouring gminas ==
Gmina Kiełczygłów is bordered by the gminas of Osjaków, Pajęczno, Rusiec, Rząśnia and Siemkowice.
