= Gmina Działoszyn =

Gmina Działoszyn Działoszyn Commune
- Gmina
- Municipal hall of Działoszyn

- Coat of arms
- Interactive map of Gmina Działoszyn
- Coordinates (Działoszyn): 51°7′4″N 18°52′12″E
- Country: Poland
- Voivodeship: Łódź
- County: Pajęczno
- Seat: Działoszyn

Area
  - Total: 120.59 km^{2} (46.56 sq mi)

Population (2006)
  - Total: 12,908
  - Density: 107.04/km^{2} (277.23/sq mi)
  - Urban: 6,276
  - Rural: 6,632
- Time zone: UTC+1 (CET)
  - Summer (DST): UTC+2 (CEST)
- Website: www.dzialoszyn.pl

Gmina Działoszyn is an urban-rural gmina (administrative district) in Pajęczno County, Łódź Voivodeship, in central Poland. Its seat is the town of Działoszyn, which lies approximately 10 kilometres (6 mi) west of Pajęczno and 85 km (53 mi) south-west of the regional capital Łódź.

The gmina covers an area of 120.59 square kilometres (46.6 sq mi), and as of 2006 its total population is 12,908 (out of which the population of Działoszyn amounts to 6,276, and the population of the rural part of the gmina is 6,632).

== Villages ==
Apart from the town of Działoszyn, Gmina Działoszyn contains the villages and settlements of:

- Bobrowniki
- Bugaj
- Draby
- Grądy-Łazy
- Kapituła
- Kiedosy
- Lisowice
- Lisowice-Kolonia
- Młynki
- Niżankowice
- Patoki Małe
- Posmykowizna
- Raciszyn
- Sadowiec
- Sadowiec-Niwa
- Sadowiec-Pieńki
- Sadowiec-Wrzosy
- Sęsów
- Szczepany
- Szczyty
- Szczyty-Błaszkowizna
- Szczyty-Las
- Tasarze
- Trębaczew
- Węże
- Wójtostwo
- Zalesiaki
- Zalesiaki-Pieńki

== Neighbouring gminas ==
Gmina Działoszyn is bordered by the gminas of Lipie, Pajęczno, Pątnów, Popów, Siemkowice and Wierzchlas.
