= Wyręba =

Wyręba may refer to the following places in Poland:

- Wyręba, Lower Silesian Voivodeship (south-west Poland)
- Wyręba, Kuyavian-Pomeranian Voivodeship (north-central Poland)
- Wyręba, Łódź Voivodeship (central Poland)
- Wyręba, Warmian-Masurian Voivodeship (north Poland)
