= Huta, Pajęczno County =

Huta
- Village
- Location within Poland
- Coordinates: 51°16′18″N 18°57′34″E
- Country: Poland
- Voivodeship: Łódź
- County: Pajęczno
- Gmina: Kiełczygłów

Huta [ˈxuta] is a village in the administrative district of Gmina Kiełczygłów, within Pajęczno County, Łódź Voivodeship, in central Poland.
