= Dębowiec Mały =

- Village
- Location within Poland
- Coordinates: 51°8′57″N 19°12′53″E
- Country: Poland
- Voivodeship: Łódź
- County: Pajęczno
- Gmina: Strzelce Wielkie

Dębowiec Mały [dɛmˈbɔvjɛt͡s ˈmawɨ] is a village in the administrative district of Gmina Strzelce Wielkie, within Pajęczno County, Łódź Voivodeship, in central Poland.
