= Patoki Małe =

- Village
- Location within Poland
- Coordinates: 51°04′50″N 18°51′09″E
- Country: Poland
- Voivodeship: Łódź
- County: Pajęczno
- Gmina: Działoszyn

Patoki Małe [paˈtɔki ˈmawɛ] is a village in the administrative district of Gmina Działoszyn, Pajęczno County, Łódź Voivodeship, Poland.
