= Węże, Łódź Voivodeship =

Węże
- Village
- Location within Poland
- Coordinates: 51°5′23″N 18°47′43″E
- Country: Poland
- Voivodeship: Łódź
- County: Pajęczno
- Gmina: Działoszyn
- Population: 100

Węże [ˈvɛ̃ʐɛ] is a village in the administrative district of Gmina Działoszyn, within Pajęczno County, Łódź Voivodeship, in central Poland.
