= Marzęcice, Łódź Voivodeship =

Marzęcice
- Village
- Location within Poland
- Coordinates: 51°8′N 19°6′E
- Country: Poland
- Voivodeship: Łódź
- County: Pajęczno
- Gmina: Strzelce Wielkie
- Elevation: 225 m (738 ft)
- Population: 320

Marzęcice [maʐɛnˈt͡ɕit͡sɛ] is a village in the administrative district of Gmina Strzelce Wielkie, within Pajęczno County, Łódź Voivodeship, in central Poland.
