= Ignaców, Pajęczno County =

Ignaców
- Village
- Location within Poland
- Coordinates: 51°11′21″N 18°52′19″E
- Country: Poland
- Voivodeship: Łódź
- County: Pajęczno
- Gmina: Siemkowice

Ignaców [iɡˈnat͡suf] is a village in the administrative district of Gmina Siemkowice, within Pajęczno County, Łódź Voivodeship, in central Poland.
