= Dębowiec Wielki =

- Village
- Location within Poland
- Coordinates: 51°9′29″N 19°12′16″E
- Country: Poland
- Voivodeship: Łódź
- County: Pajęczno
- Gmina: Strzelce Wielkie

Dębowiec Wielki (Polish pronunciation: [dɛmˈbɔvjɛts ˈfjɛlkʲi]) is a village in the administrative district of Gmina Strzelce Wielkie, within Pajęczno County, Łódź Voivodeship, in central Poland.
