= Górki, Pajęczno County =

Górki
- Village
- Location within Poland
- Coordinates: 51°9′15″N 19°10′13″E
- Country: Poland
- Voivodeship: Łódź
- County: Pajęczno
- Gmina: Strzelce Wielkie
- Population: 180

Górki [ˈɡurki] is a village in the administrative district of Gmina Strzelce Wielkie, within Pajęczno County, Łódź Voivodeship, in central Poland.
