= Laski, Pajęczno County =

Laski
- Village
- Location within Poland
- Coordinates: 51°12′20″N 18°49′19″E
- Country: Poland
- Voivodeship: Łódź
- County: Pajęczno
- Gmina: Siemkowice

Laski (Polish pronunciation: [ˈlaskʲi]) is a village in the administrative district of Gmina Siemkowice, within Pajęczno County, Łódź Voivodeship, in central Poland.
