= Broszęcin =

- Village
- Location within Poland
- Coordinates: 51°17′N 19°5′E
- Country: Poland
- Voivodeship: Łódź
- County: Pajęczno
- Gmina: Rząśnia

Broszęcin [brɔˈʂɛnt͡ɕin] is a village in the administrative district of Gmina Rząśnia, within Pajęczno County, Łódź Voivodeship, in central Poland.
