= Sadowiec-Pieńki =

- Village
- Location within Poland
- Coordinates: 51°09′38″N 18°55′02″E
- Country: Poland
- Voivodeship: Łódź
- County: Pajęczno
- Gmina: Działoszyn

Sadowiec-Pieńki [saˈdɔvjɛt͡s ˈpjɛɲki] is a village in the administrative district of Gmina Działoszyn, within Pajęczno County, Łódź Voivodeship, in central Poland.
