= Krysiaki, Łódź Voivodeship =

Krysiaki
- Village
- Location within Poland
- Coordinates: 51°16′N 19°4′E
- Country: Poland
- Voivodeship: Łódź
- County: Pajęczno
- Gmina: Rząśnia

Krysiaki [krɨˈɕaki] is a village in the administrative district of Gmina Rząśnia, within Pajęczno County, Łódź Voivodeship, in central Poland.
