= Kodrań, Gmina Rząśnia =

Kodrań
- Village
- Location within Poland
- Coordinates: 51°17′07″N 19°04′06″E
- Country: Poland
- Voivodeship: Łódź
- County: Pajęczno
- Gmina: Rząśnia

Kodrań [ˈkɔdraɲ] is a village in the administrative district of Gmina Rząśnia, within Pajęczno County, Łódź Voivodeship, in central Poland.
