= Gumnisko, Pajęczno County =

Gumnisko
- Village
- Location within Poland
- Coordinates: 51°14′N 18°58′E
- Country: Poland
- Voivodeship: Łódź
- County: Pajęczno
- Gmina: Kiełczygłów

Gumnisko [ɡumˈniskɔ] is a village in the administrative district of Gmina Kiełczygłów, within Pajęczno County, Łódź Voivodeship, in central Poland.
