= Rekle =

Rekle may refer to:

- Rekle, Podlaskie Voivodeship
- Rekle, Łódź Voivodeship

== See also ==
- Rekkles (born 1996), Swedish League of Legends player who currently plays AD Carry for fnatic of the European League of Legends Championship Series (EU LCS)
