= Kule, Łódź Voivodeship =

Village in central Poland

Kule
- Settlement
- Location within Poland
- Coordinates: 51°15′N 19°0′E
- Country: Poland
- Voivodeship: Łódź
- County: Pajęczno
- Gmina: Kiełczygłów

Kule [ˈkulɛ] is a settlement in the administrative district of Gmina Kiełczygłów, within Pajęczno County, Łódź Voivodeship, in central Poland.
