= Okupniki, Łódź Voivodeship =

Okupniki
- Village
- Location within Poland
- Coordinates: 51°13′53″N 18°58′54″E
- Country: Poland
- Voivodeship: Łódź
- County: Pajęczno
- Gmina: Kiełczygłów
- Population: 180

Okupniki [ɔkupˈniki] is a village in the administrative district of Gmina Kiełczygłów, within Pajęczno County, Łódź Voivodeship, in central Poland.
