= Lisowice, Pajęczno County =

Lisowice
- Village
- Location within Poland
- Coordinates: 51°6′24″N 18°49′55″E
- Country: Poland
- Voivodeship: Łódź
- County: Pajęczno
- Gmina: Działoszyn

Lisowice [lisɔˈvit͡sɛ] is a village in the administrative district of Gmina Działoszyn, within Pajęczno County, Łódź Voivodeship, in central Poland.
