= Lipnik, Łódź Voivodeship =

Lipnik
- Village
- Location within Poland
- Coordinates: 51°14′N 18°53′E
- Country: Poland
- Voivodeship: Łódź
- County: Pajęczno
- Gmina: Siemkowice
- Population: 653
- Website: lipnikcity.pl.tl

Lipnik (Polish pronunciation: [ˈlipɲik]) is a village in the administrative district of Gmina Siemkowice, within Pajęczno County, Łódź Voivodeship, in central Poland.
