= Tasarze =

- Village
- Location within Poland
- Coordinates: 51°06′32″N 18°48′19″E
- Country: Poland
- Voivodeship: Łódź
- County: Pajęczno
- Gmina: Działoszyn

Tasarze [taˈsaʐɛ] is a village in the administrative district of Gmina Działoszyn, within Pajęczno County, Łódź Voivodeship, in central Poland.
