= Gmina Rząśnia =

Gmina Rząśnia Rząśnia Commune
- Gmina
- Flag Coat of arms
- Interactive map of Gmina Rząśnia
- Coordinates (Rząśnia): 51°13′15″N 19°2′28″E
- Country: Poland
- Voivodeship: Łódź
- County: Pajęczno
- Seat: Rząśnia

Area
  - Total: 86.37 km^{2} (33.35 sq mi)

Population (2006)
  - Total: 4,802
  - Density: 55.60/km^{2} (144.0/sq mi)
- Website: http://www.rzasnia.pl/

Gmina Rząśnia is a rural gmina (administrative district) in Pajęczno County, Łódź Voivodeship, in central Poland. Its seat is the village of Rząśnia, which lies approximately 9 kilometres (6 mi) north of Pajęczno and 70 km (43 mi) south-west of the regional capital Łódź.

The gmina covers an area of 86.37 square kilometres (33.3 sq mi), and as of 2006 its total population is 4,802.

In the municipality of Rząśnia, there is a brown Coal Mine

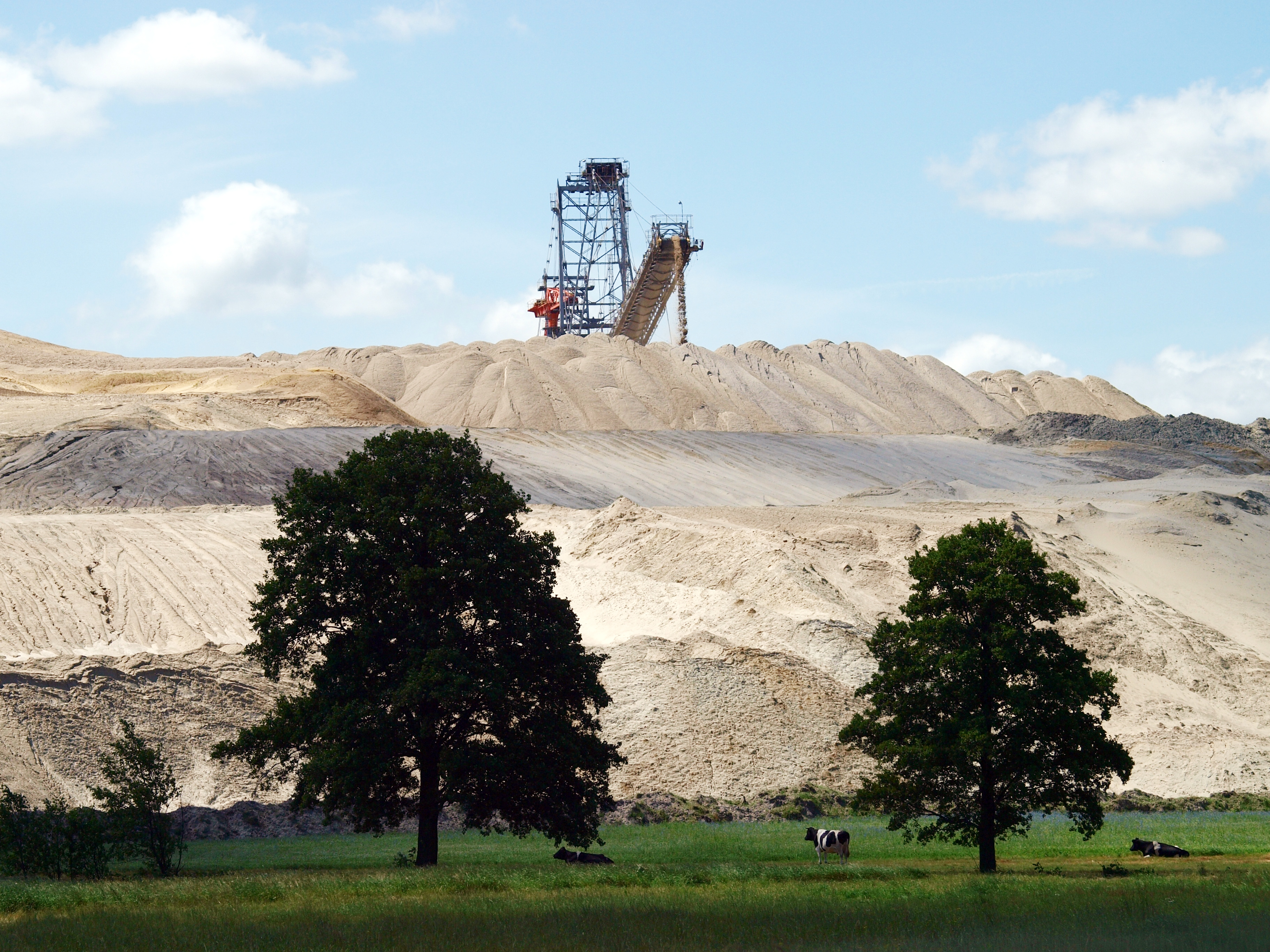
Coal Mine Bełchatów

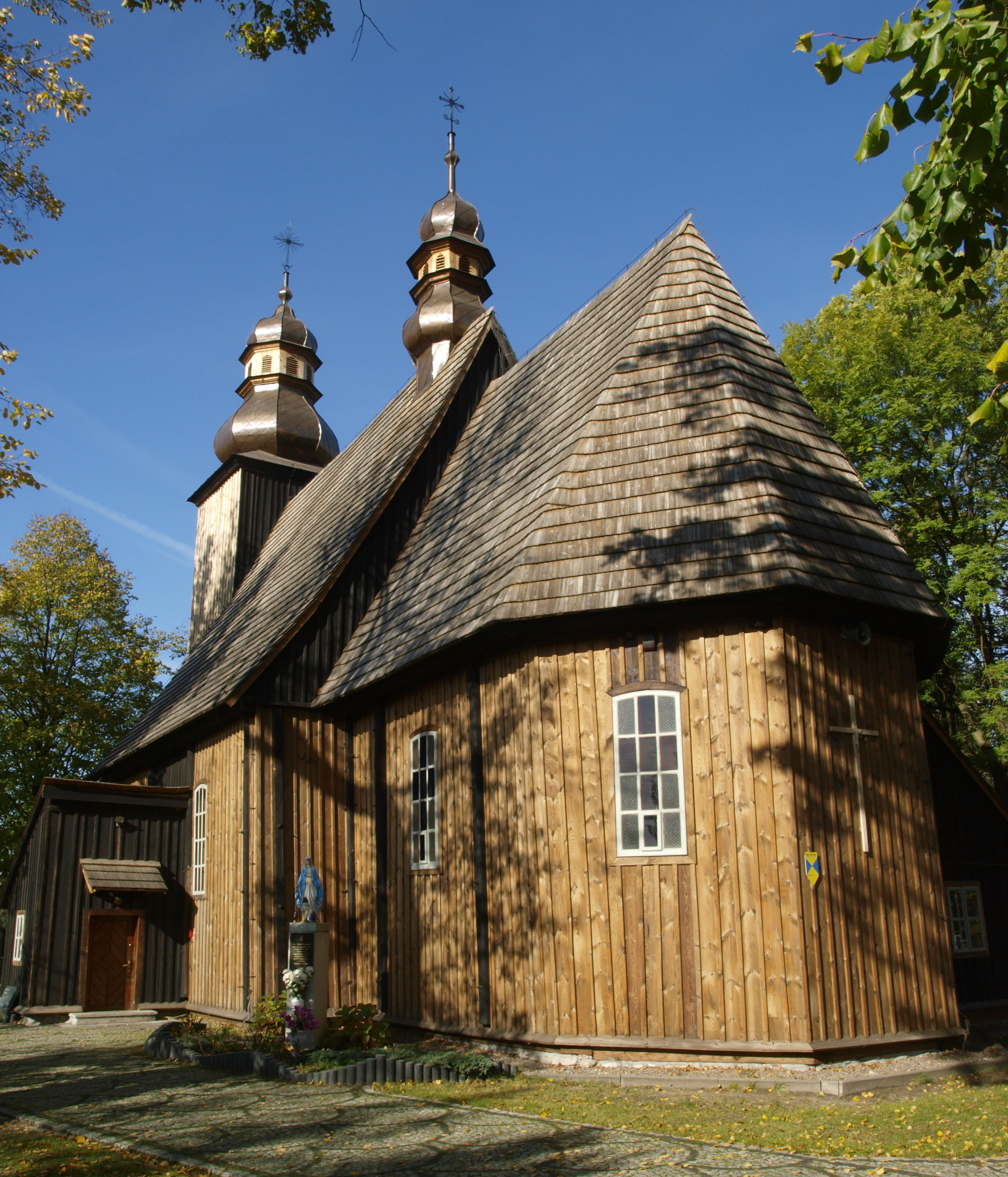
Church in Stróża

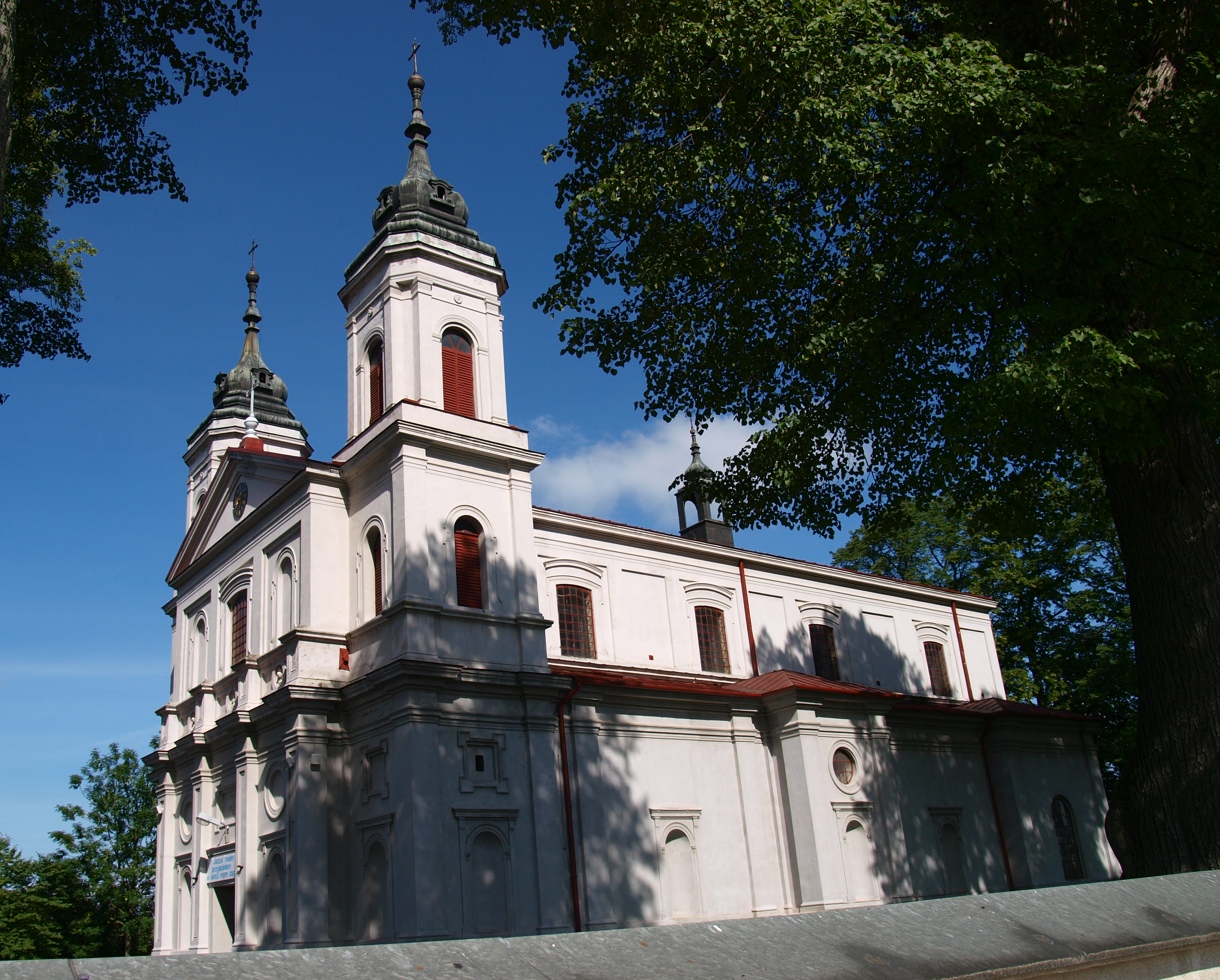
Church in Rząśnia

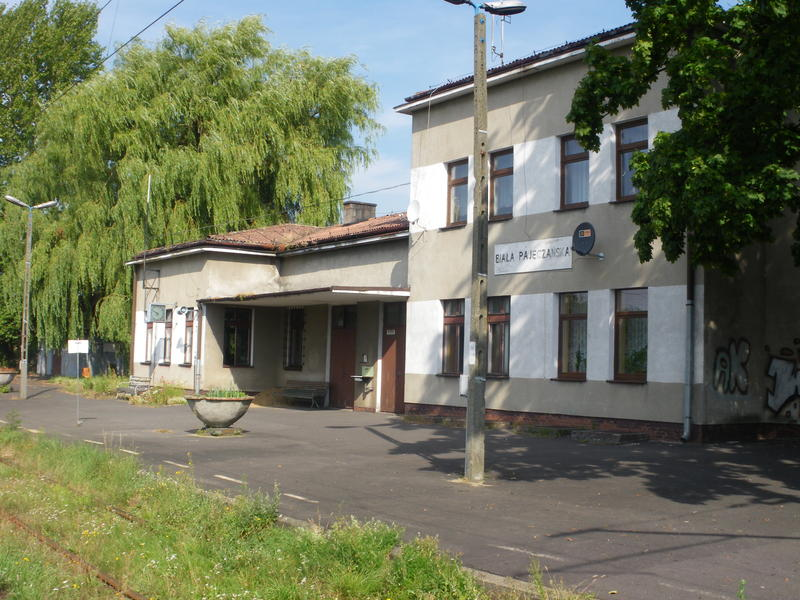
Railway station in Biała

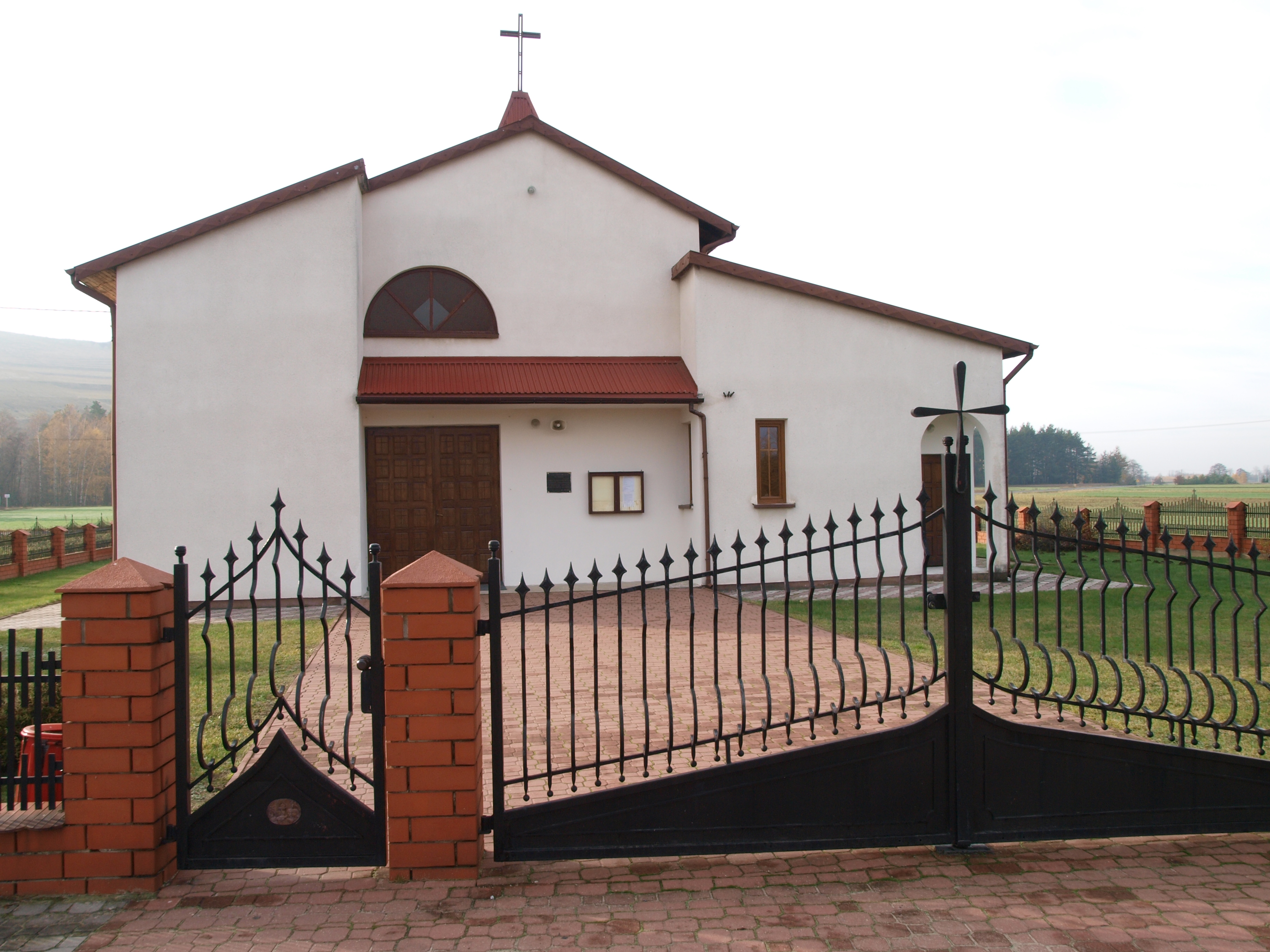
Church in Kodrań

== Villages ==
Gmina Rząśnia contains the villages and settlements of Augustów, Będków, Biała, Broszęcin, Broszęcin-Kolonia, Gawłów, Kodrań, Krysiaki, Marcelin, Rekle, Rychłowiec, Rząśnia, Ścięgna, Stróża, Suchowola, Suchowola-Majątek, Zabrzezie, Żary and Zielęcin.

== Neighbouring gminas ==
Gmina Rząśnia is bordered by the gminas of Kiełczygłów, Pajęczno, Rusiec, Strzelce Wielkie, Sulmierzyce and Szczerców.
