= Szczyty-Błaszkowizna =

- Village
- Location within Poland
- Coordinates: 51°09′09″N 18°51′46″E
- Country: Poland
- Voivodeship: Łódź
- County: Pajęczno
- Gmina: Działoszyn

Szczyty-Błaszkowizna [ˈʂt͡ʂɨtɨ bwaʂkɔˈvizna] is a village in the administrative district of Gmina Działoszyn, within Pajęczno County, Łódź Voivodeship, in central Poland.
