= Katarzynopole =

- Village
- Location within Poland
- Coordinates: 51°14′42″N 18°48′35″E
- Country: Poland
- Voivodeship: Łódź
- County: Pajęczno
- Gmina: Siemkowice

Katarzynopole [kataʐɨnɔˈpɔlɛ] is a village in the administrative district of Gmina Siemkowice, within Pajęczno County, Łódź Voivodeship, in central Poland.
