= Ścięgna, Łódź Voivodeship =

Ścięgna
- Village
- Location within Poland
- Coordinates: 51°13′21″N 19°7′50″E
- Country: Poland
- Voivodeship: Łódź
- County: Pajęczno
- Gmina: Rząśnia

Ścięgna [ˈɕt͡ɕɛŋɡna] is a village in the administrative district of Gmina Rząśnia, within Pajęczno County, Łódź Voivodeship, in central Poland.
