= Dryganek Duży =

- Village
- Location within Poland
- Coordinates: 51°15′15″N 18°58′38″E
- Country: Poland
- Voivodeship: Łódź
- County: Pajęczno
- Gmina: Kiełczygłów

Dryganek Duży [drɨˈɡanɛk ˈduʐɨ] is a village in the administrative district of Gmina Kiełczygłów, within Pajęczno County, Łódź Voivodeship, in central Poland.
