= Borki, Pajęczno County =

Borki
- Village
- Location within Poland
- Coordinates: 51°13′5″N 18°50′20″E
- Country: Poland
- Voivodeship: Łódź
- County: Pajęczno
- Gmina: Siemkowice

Borki [ˈbɔrki] is a village in the administrative district of Gmina Siemkowice, within Pajęczno County, Łódź Voivodeship, in central Poland.
