= Kolonia Kiełczygłów =

- Village
- Location within Poland
- Coordinates: 51°14′19″N 19°0′24″E
- Country: Poland
- Voivodeship: Łódź
- County: Pajęczno
- Gmina: Kiełczygłów
- Population: 130

Kolonia Kiełczygłów [kɔˈlɔɲa kʲɛu̯ˈt͡ʂɨɡwuf] is a village in the administrative district of Gmina Kiełczygłów, within Pajęczno County, Łódź Voivodeship, in central Poland.
