= Gawłów =

Gawłów may refer to the following places:

- Gawłów, Lesser Poland Voivodeship (south Poland)
- Gawłów, Łódź Voivodeship (central Poland)
- Gawłów, Masovian Voivodeship (east-central Poland)
