= Grądy, Pajęczno County =

Grądy
- Village
- Location within Poland
- Coordinates: 51°5′56″N 18°56′7″E
- Country: Poland
- Voivodeship: Łódź
- County: Pajęczno
- Gmina: Działoszyn

Grądy [ˈɡrɔndɨ] is a village in the administrative district of Gmina Działoszyn, within Pajęczno County, Łódź Voivodeship, in central Poland.
