= Niżankowice =

- Village
- Location within Poland
- Coordinates: 51°9′15″N 18°47′25″E
- Country: Poland
- Voivodeship: Łódź
- County: Pajęczno
- Gmina: Działoszyn
- Population: 300

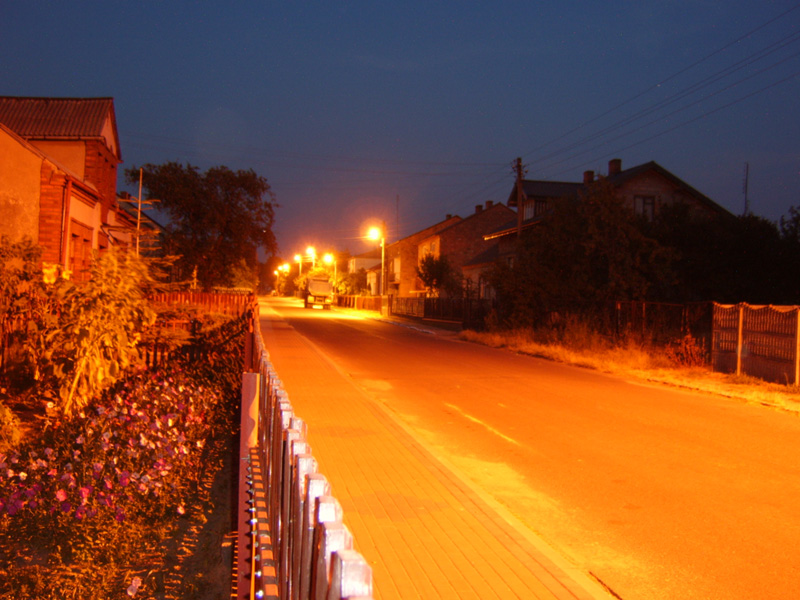
Nizankowice, Gmina Działoszyn

Niżankowice [niʐaŋkɔˈvit͡sɛ] is a village in the administrative district of Gmina Działoszyn, within Pajęczno County, Łódź Voivodeship, in central Poland.
