= Suchowola-Majątek =

Village in Gmina Rząśnia, Poland

- Village
- Location within Poland
- Coordinates: 51°11′35″N 19°05′07″E
- Country: Poland
- Voivodeship: Łódź
- County: Pajęczno
- Gmina: Rząśnia

Suchowola-Majątek [suxɔˈvɔla maˈjɔntɛk] is a village in the administrative district of Gmina Rząśnia, within Pajęczno County, Łódź Voivodeship, in central Poland.
