= Żary, Łódź Voivodeship =

Żary
- Village
- Location within Poland
- Coordinates: 51°14′5″N 19°3′5″E
- Country: Poland
- Voivodeship: Łódź
- County: Pajęczno
- Gmina: Rząśnia
- Population: 160

Żary [ˈʐarɨ] is a village in the administrative district of Gmina Rząśnia, within Pajęczno County, Łódź Voivodeship, in central Poland.
