= Zielęcin, Pajęczno County =

Zielęcin
- Village
- Location within Poland
- Coordinates: 51°13′N 19°6′E
- Country: Poland
- Voivodeship: Łódź
- County: Pajęczno
- Gmina: Rząśnia
- Population (approx.): 500

Zielęcin [ʑɛˈlɛnt͡ɕin] is a village in the administrative district of Gmina Rząśnia, within Pajęczno County, Łódź Voivodeship, in central Poland.

The village has an approximate population of 500.
