= Jaworznica =

- Village
- Location within Poland
- Coordinates: 51°13′35″N 18°59′27″E
- Country: Poland
- Voivodeship: Łódź
- County: Pajęczno
- Gmina: Kiełczygłów
- Population: 180

Jaworznica [javɔʐˈnit͡sa] is a village in the administrative district of Gmina Kiełczygłów, within Pajęczno County, Łódź Voivodeship, in central Poland.
