= Chorzew, Łódź Voivodeship =

Chorzew
- Village
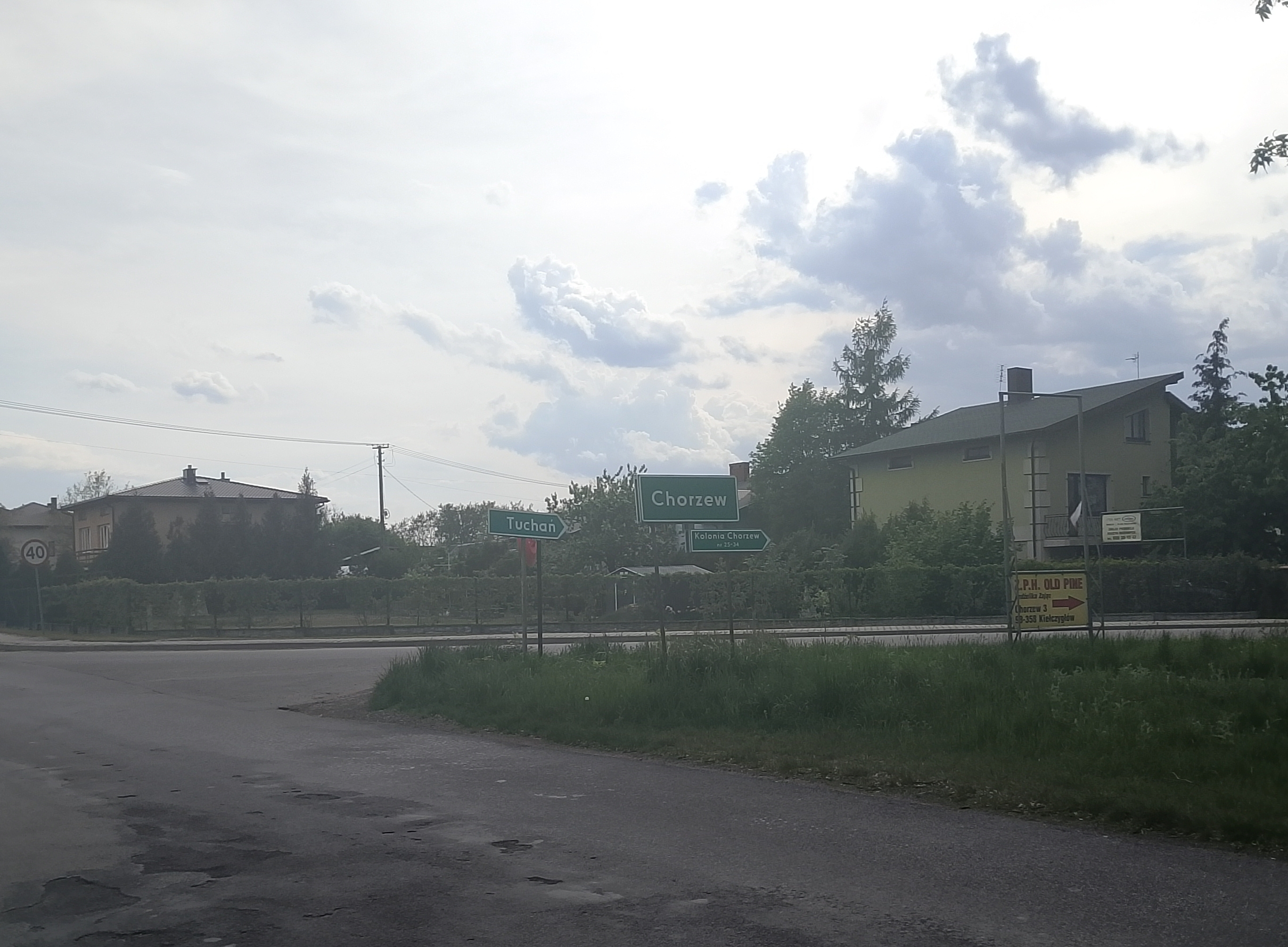

- Location within Poland
- Coordinates: 51°12′19″N 18°56′45″E
- Country: Poland
- Voivodeship: Łódź
- County: Pajęczno
- Gmina: Kiełczygłów

Chorzew [ˈxɔʐɛf] is a village in the administrative district of Gmina Kiełczygłów, within Pajęczno County, Łódź Voivodeship, in central Poland.
