= Osina Mała, Łódź Voivodeship =

Osina Mała
- Village
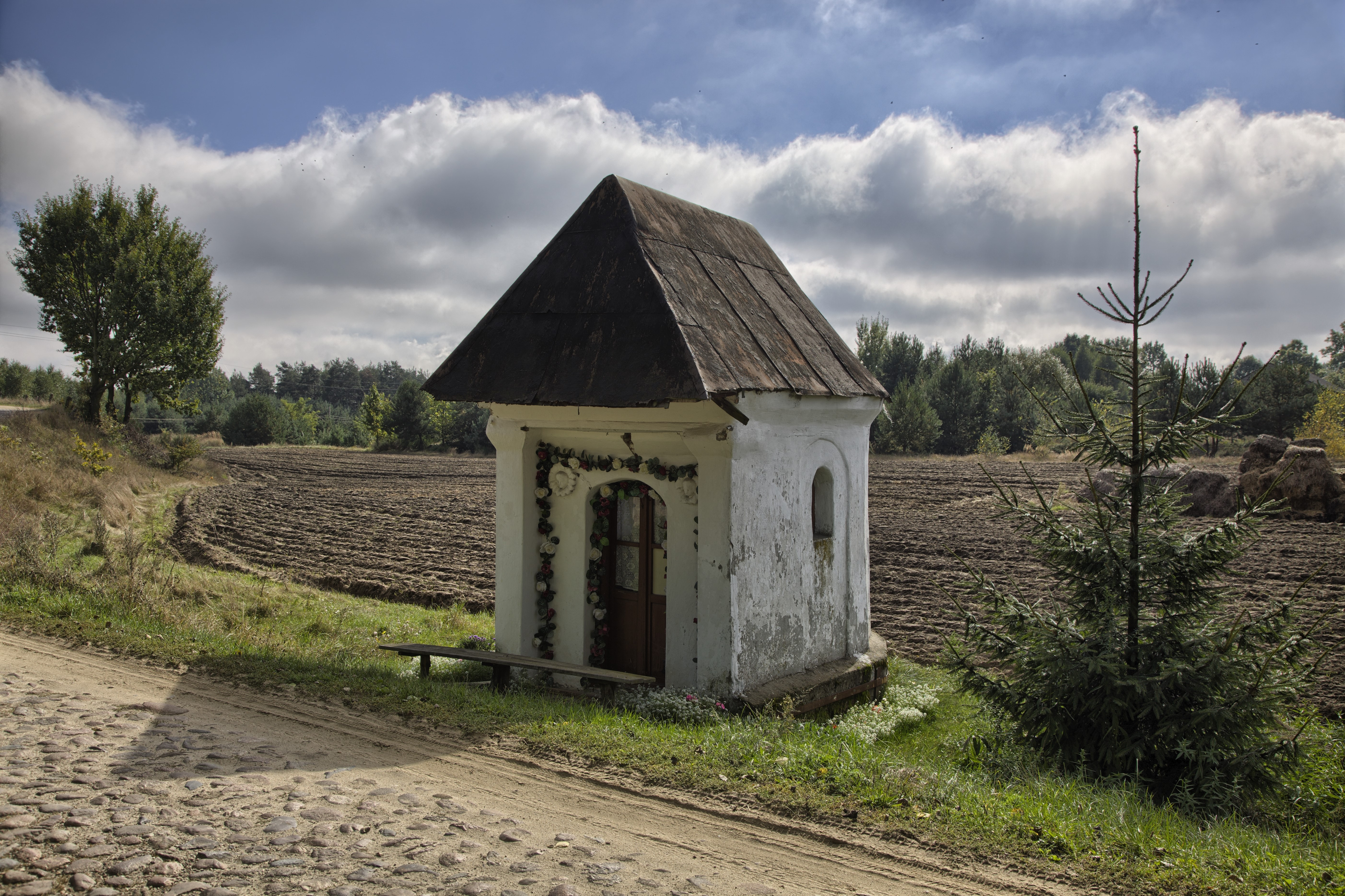
- Wayside shrine in the area

- Location within Poland
- Coordinates: 51°14′41″N 18°57′26″E
- Country: Poland
- Voivodeship: Łódź
- County: Pajęczno
- Gmina: Kiełczygłów

Osina Mała [ɔˈɕina ˈmawa] is a village in the administrative district of Gmina Kiełczygłów, within Pajęczno County, Łódź Voivodeship, in central Poland.
