= Gawłów, Łódź Voivodeship =

Gawłów
- Village
- Location within Poland
- Coordinates: 51°11′N 19°3′E
- Country: Poland
- Voivodeship: Łódź
- County: Pajęczno
- Gmina: Rząśnia

Gawłów [ˈɡavwuf] is a village in the administrative district of Gmina Rząśnia, within Pajęczno County, Łódź Voivodeship, in central Poland.
