= Będków, Pajęczno County =

Będków
- Village
- Location within Poland
- Coordinates: 51°14′41″N 19°3′21″E
- Country: Poland
- Voivodeship: Łódź
- County: Pajęczno
- Gmina: Rząśnia

Będków [ˈbɛntkuf] is a village in the administrative district of Gmina Rząśnia, within Pajęczno County, Łódź Voivodeship, in central Poland.
