= Kije, Pajęczno County =

Kije
- Village
- Location within Poland
- Coordinates: 51°15′51″N 18°51′09″E
- Country: Poland
- Voivodeship: Łódź
- County: Pajęczno
- Gmina: Siemkowice

Kije [ˈkijɛ] is a village located in the administrative district of Gmina Siemkowice, within Pajęczno County, Łódź Voivodeship, in central Poland.
