= Rekle, Łódź Voivodeship =

Rekle
- Village
- Location within Poland
- Coordinates: 51°11′18″N 19°6′13″E
- Country: Poland
- Voivodeship: Łódź
- County: Pajęczno
- Gmina: Rząśnia
- Population (approx.): 300

Rekle [ˈrɛklɛ] is a village in the administrative district of Gmina Rząśnia, within Pajęczno County, Łódź Voivodeship, in central Poland.

The village has an approximate population of 300.
