= Wyręba, Łódź Voivodeship =

Wyręba
- Village
- Location within Poland
- Coordinates: 51°13′42″N 18°57′54″E
- Country: Poland
- Voivodeship: Łódź
- County: Pajęczno
- Gmina: Kiełczygłów
- Population: 180

Wyręba [vɨˈrɛmba] is a village in the administrative district of Gmina Kiełczygłów, within Pajęczno County, Łódź Voivodeship, in central Poland.
