= Strzelce Wielkie, Łódź Voivodeship =

Strzelce Wielkie
- Village
- Location within Poland
- Coordinates: 51°8′22″N 19°8′42″E
- Country: Poland
- Voivodeship: Łódź
- County: Pajęczno
- Gmina: Strzelce Wielkie
- Population: 1,100

Strzelce Wielkie [ˈstʂɛlt͡sɛ ˈvjɛlkʲɛ] is a village in Pajęczno County, Łódź Voivodeship, in central Poland. It is the seat of the gmina (administrative district) called Gmina Strzelce Wielkie.
