= Siemkowice =

- Village
- Location within Poland
- Coordinates: 51°12′N 18°54′E
- Country: Poland
- Voivodeship: Łódź
- County: Pajęczno
- Gmina: Siemkowice
- Population: 1,100

Siemkowice [ɕɛmkɔˈvit͡sɛ] is a village in Pajęczno County, Łódź Voivodeship, in central Poland. It is the seat of the gmina (administrative district) called Gmina Siemkowice.
