= Kiełczygłów =

- Village
- Location within Poland
- Coordinates: 51°14′21″N 18°59′4″E
- Country: Poland
- Voivodeship: Łódź
- County: Pajęczno
- Gmina: Kiełczygłów
- Population: 561

Kiełczygłów [kʲɛu̯ˈt͡ʂɨɡwuf] is a village in Pajęczno County, Łódź Voivodeship, in central Poland. It is the seat of the gmina (administrative district) called Gmina Kiełczygłów.
