= Rząśnia =

- Village
- Flag Coat of arms

- Location within Poland
- Coordinates: 51°13′15″N 19°2′28″E
- Country: Poland
- Voivodeship: Łódź
- County: Pajęczno
- Gmina: Rząśnia
- Population: 1,100
- Website: http://rzasnia.pl

Rząśnia [ˈʐɔ̃ɕɲa] is a village in Pajęczno County, Łódź Voivodeship, in central Poland. It is the seat of the gmina (administrative district) called Gmina Rząśnia.

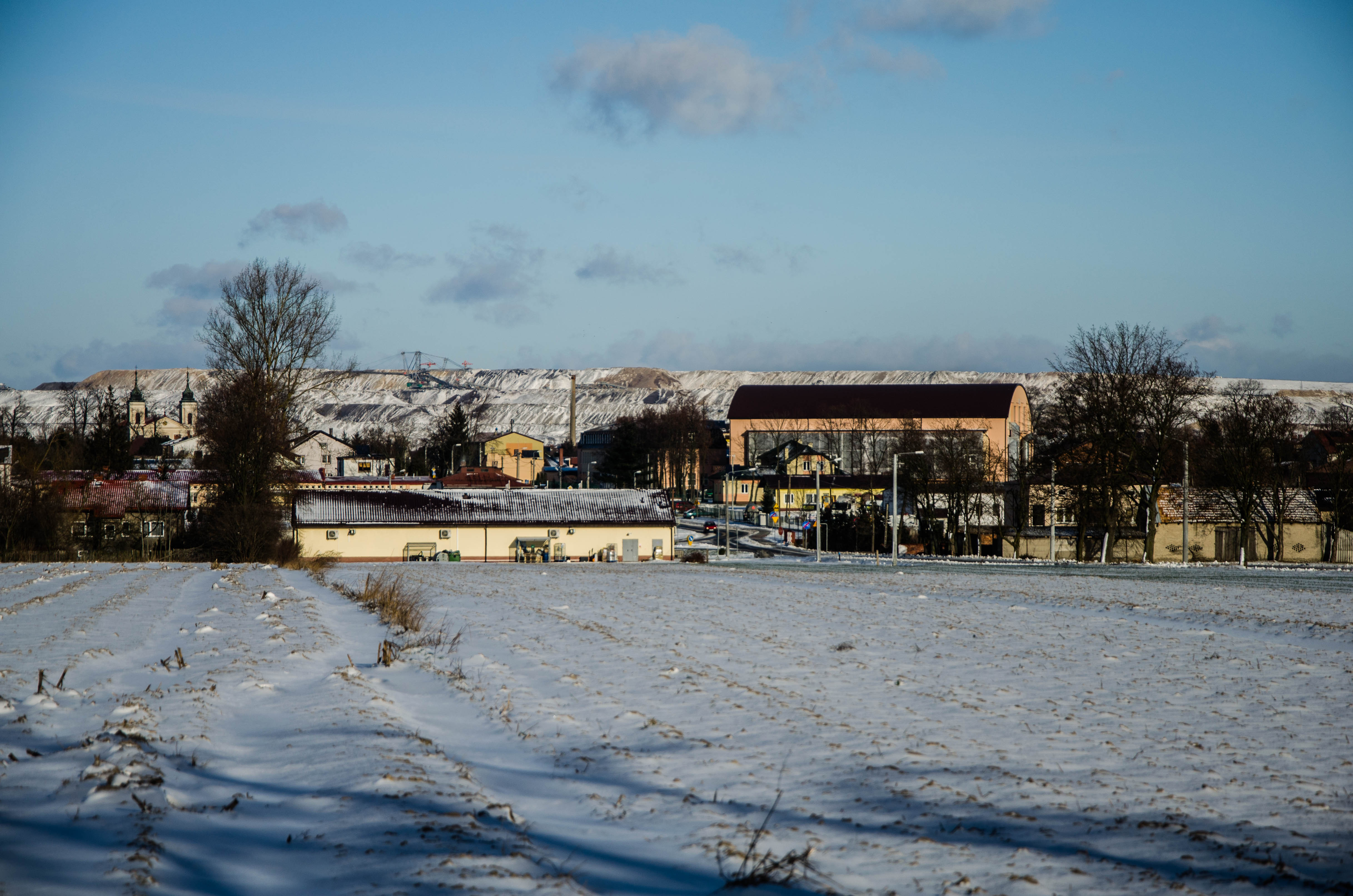
Rząśnia

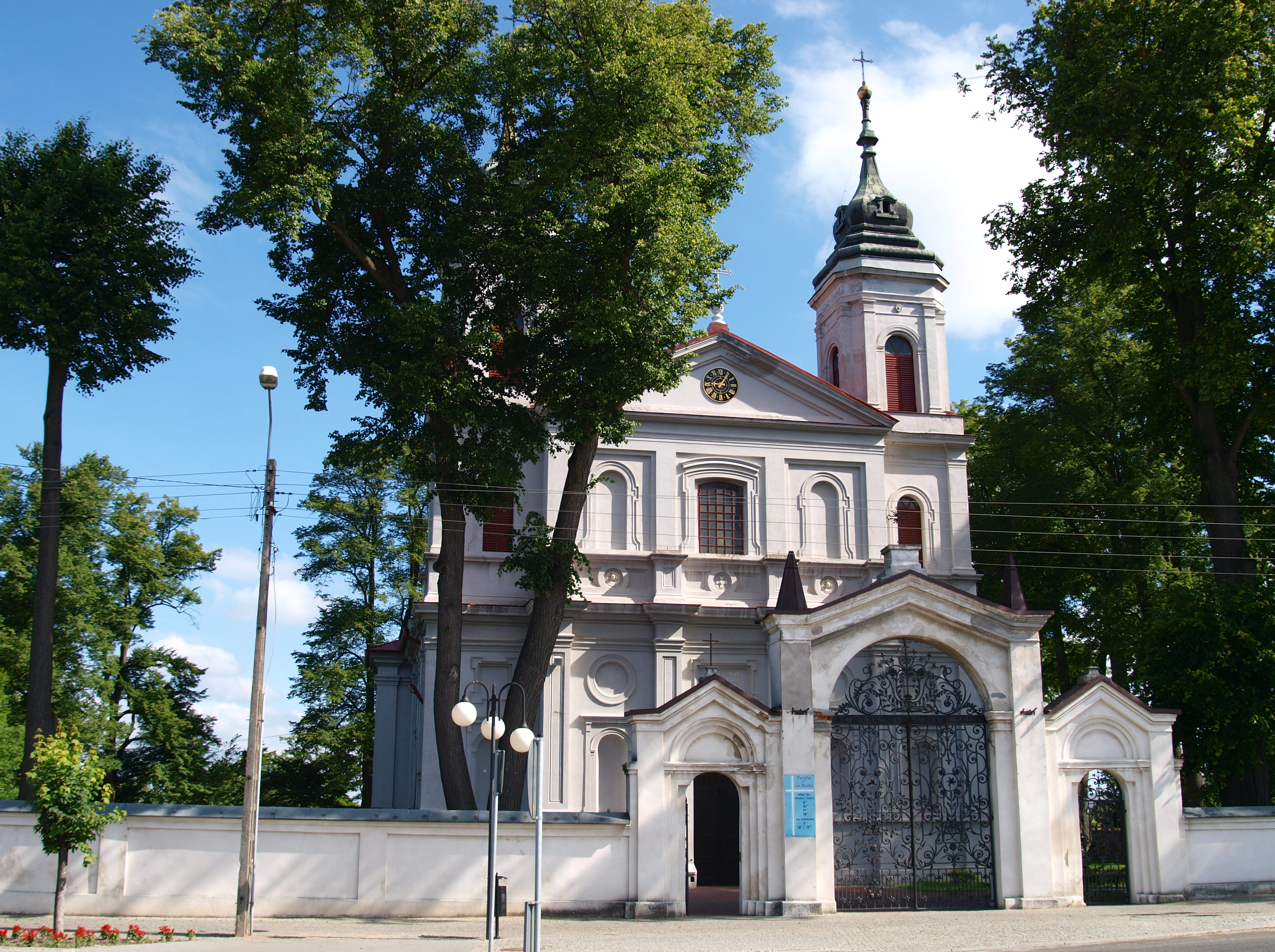
Church in Rząśnia

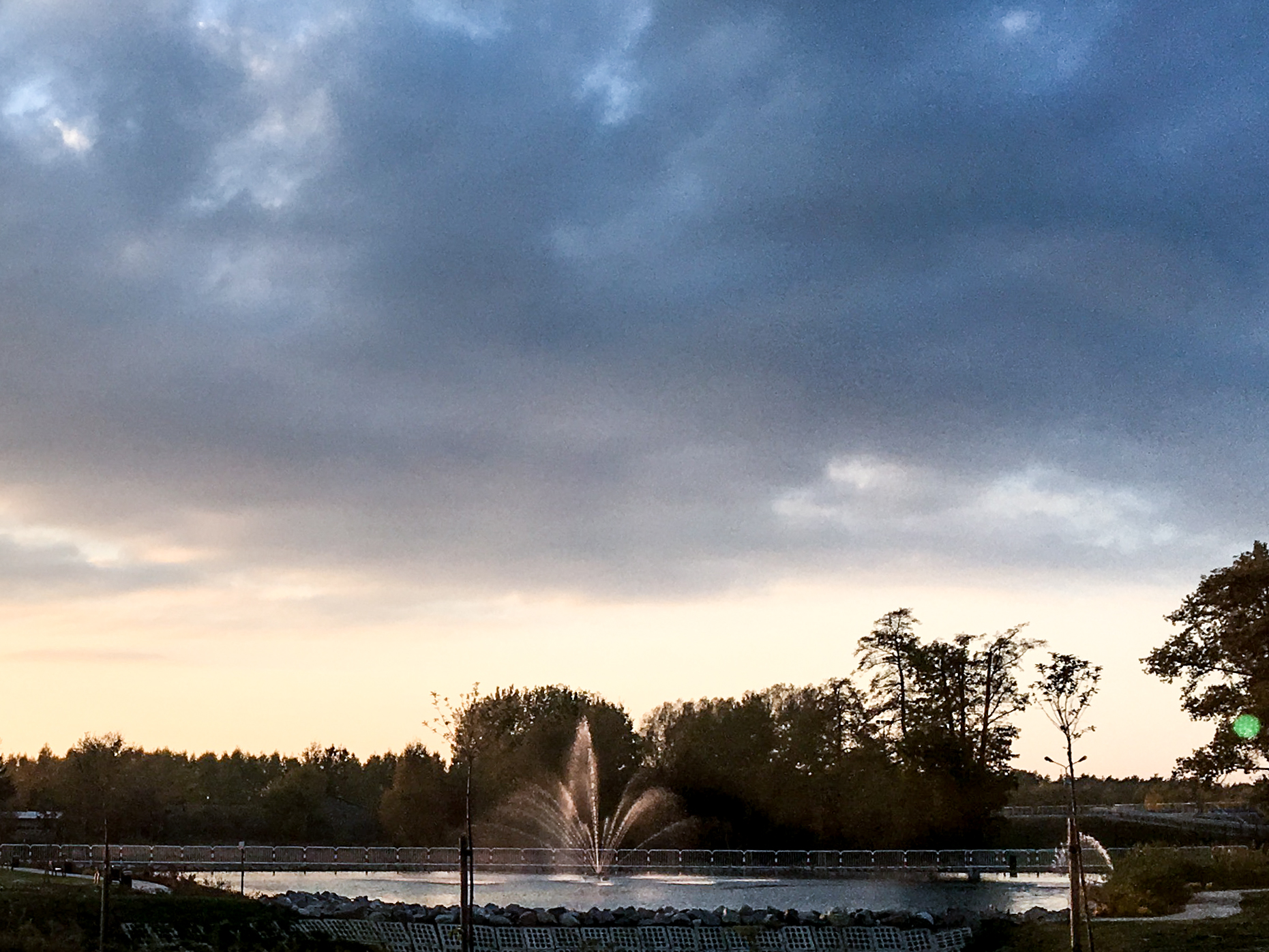
600th anniversary park

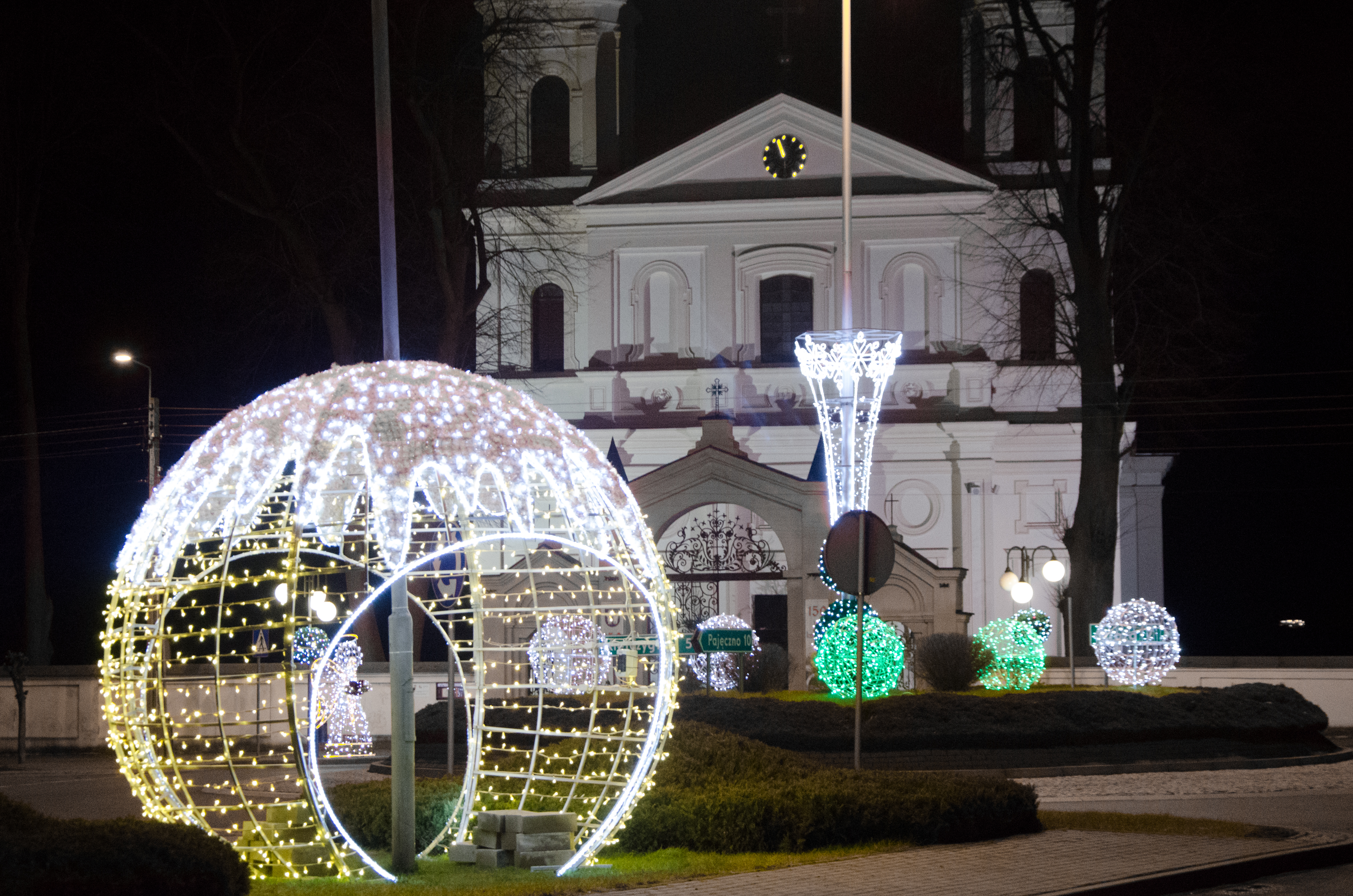
Christmas lights in Rząśnia

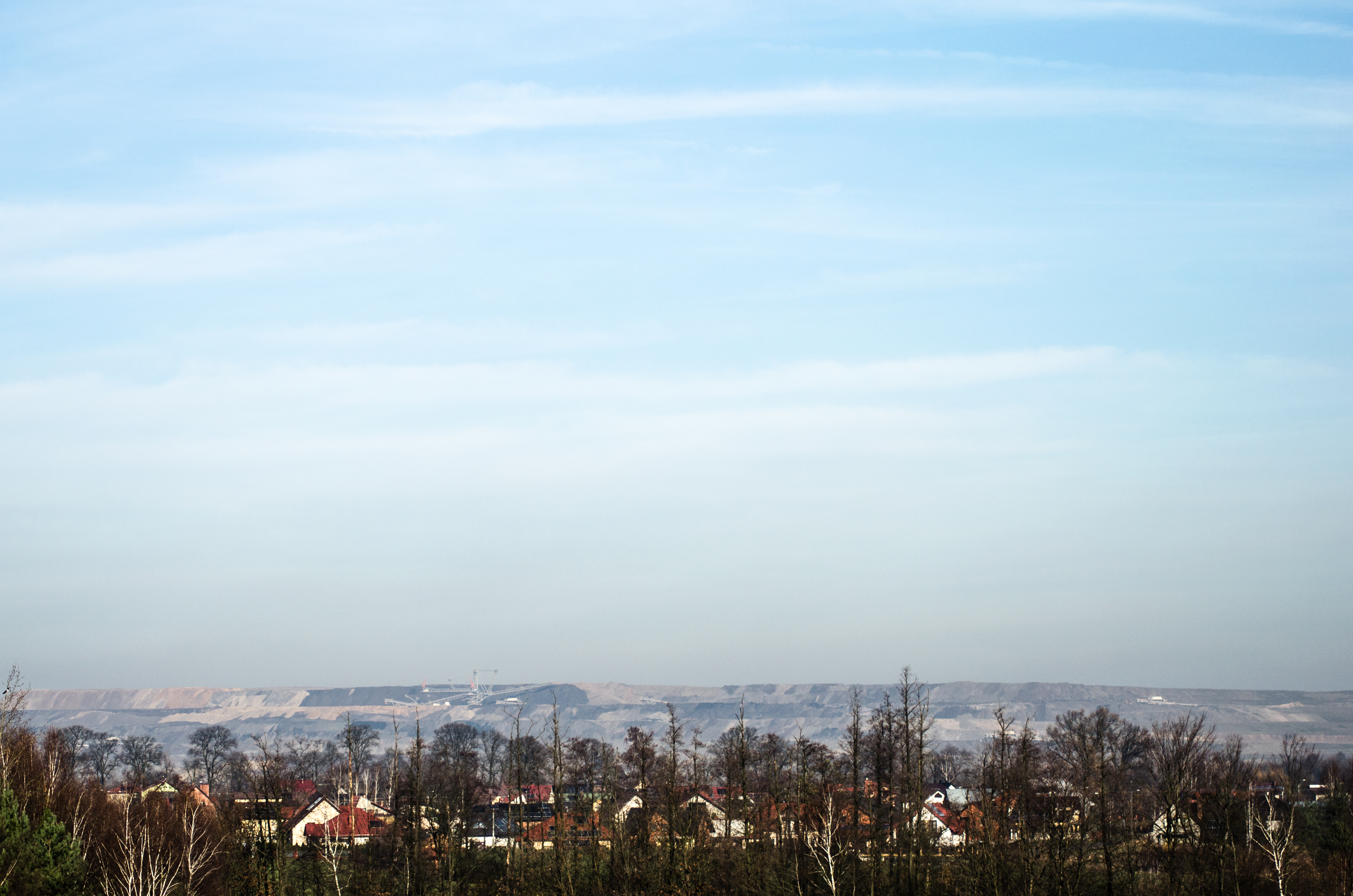
Panorama new part of Rząśnia
