= Pajęczno =

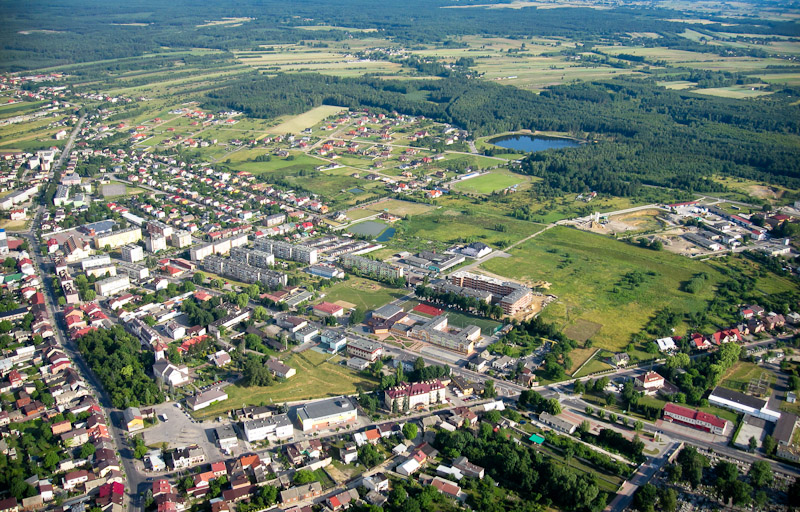
- Aerial view of the town

- Coat of arms

- Location within Poland
- Coordinates: 51°9′N 19°0′E
- Country: Poland
- Voivodeship: Łódź
- County: Pajęczno
- Gmina: Pajęczno
- First mentioned: 1140
- Town rights: 1276

Government
  - Mayor: Dariusz Tokarski

Area
  - Total: 20.21 km^{2} (7.80 sq mi)

Population (31 December 2020)
  - Total: 6,651 ▼
  - Density: 329.1/km^{2} (852.4/sq mi)
- Time zone: UTC+1 (CET)
  - Summer (DST): UTC+2 (CEST)
- Postal code: 98-330
- Vehicle registration: EPJ
- Website: http://www.pajeczno.pl/

Pajęczno [paˈjɛnt͡ʂnɔ] is a town in Poland, in Łódź Voivodeship. It is the capital of Pajęczno County. It lies approximately 40 kilometres (25 miles) north of Częstochowa. Its population is 6,651 (2020). It is located in the Sieradz Land.

== History ==
Historical population
Year	Pop.
1921	2,609
2010	6,723

First mentioned in historical sources from 1140, when it was part of Piast-ruled Poland. It had town rights between 1276 and 1870, and again from 1958. It was a royal town of Kingdom of Poland, administratively located in the Radomsko County in the Sieradz Voivodeship in the Greater Poland Province. A Jewish community had been residents of Pajęczno since the late 1700s.

In the 1921 census, 85.2% of the population declared Polish nationality and 14.8% declared Jewish nationality.

When the Germans occupied the town in September 1939, they unleashed a violent attack against the Jewish community, beginning with murder and abuse, then stripping Jews of most of their property, and in 1941, confining them to an overcrowded ghetto. After that, Jews were expelled to forced labour camps and then in August 1942, many were murdered in the town and most of the rest were sent to the Chełmno extermination camp where they were immediately gassed. In 1942, the Germans also expelled 312 Poles, who were deported to a transit camp in nearby Wieluń and then to forced labour in Germany and German-occupied France. The last few dozen Jews were sent to the Łódź Ghetto. Very few Pajęczno Jews survived the war.

On 14 June 2019 an intoxicated man drove through the town in a T-55 tank and was arrested shortly after.
