= Pajęczno County =

Pajęczno County Powiat pajęczański
- County
- Flag Coat of arms

- Location within the voivodeship

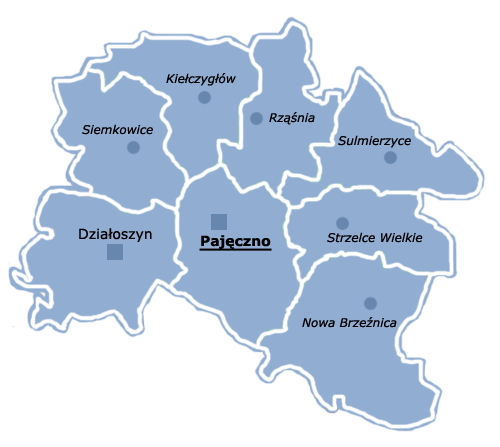
- Division into gminas
- Coordinates (Pajęczno): 51°9′N 19°0′E
- Country: Poland
- Voivodeship: Łódź
- Seat: Pajęczno
- Gminas: Total 8: Gmina Działoszyn; Gmina Kiełczygłów; Gmina Nowa Brzeźnica; Gmina Pajęczno; Gmina Rząśnia; Gmina Siemkowice; Gmina Strzelce Wielkie; Gmina Sulmierzyce

Area
  - Total: 804.14 km^{2} (310.48 sq mi)

Population (2006)
  - Total: 53,395
  - Density: 66.400/km^{2} (171.98/sq mi)
  - Urban: 12,950
  - Rural: 40,445
- Car plates: EPJ
- Website: www.powiatpajeczno.pl

Pajęczno County (Polish: powiat pajęczański) is a unit of territorial administration and local government (powiat) in Łódź Voivodeship, central Poland. It came into being on January 1, 1999, as a result of the Polish local government reforms passed in 1998. Its administrative seat and largest town is Pajęczno, which lies 78 kilometres (48 mi) south-west of the regional capital Łódź. The only other town in the county is Działoszyn, lying 10 km (6 mi) west of Pajęczno.

The county covers an area of 804.14 square kilometres (310.5 sq mi). As of 2006 its total population is 53,395, out of which the population of Pajęczno is 6,674, that of Działoszyn is 6,276, and the rural population is 40,445.

== Neighbouring counties ==
Pajęczno County is bordered by Bełchatów County to the north-east, Radomsko County to the east, Częstochowa County and Kłobuck County to the south, and Wieluń County to the west.

== Administrative divisions ==
The county is subdivided into eight gminas (two urban-rural and six rural). These are listed in the following table, in descending order of population.

Gmina	Type	Area (km^{2})	Population (2006)	Seat
Gmina Działoszyn	urban-rural	120.6	12,908	Działoszyn
Gmina Pajęczno	urban-rural	113.4	11,655	Pajęczno
Gmina Nowa Brzeźnica	rural	136.0	5,031	Nowa Brzeźnica
Gmina Siemkowice	rural	97.4	5,016	Siemkowice
Gmina Strzelce Wielkie	rural	77.7	4,883	Strzelce Wielkie
Gmina Rząśnia	rural	86.4	4,802	Rząśnia
Gmina Sulmierzyce	rural	82.7	4,757	Sulmierzyce
Gmina Kiełczygłów	rural	90.0	4,343	Kiełczygłów
