= Baltic =

Baltic may refer to:

== Peoples and languages ==
- Baltic languages, a subfamily of Indo-European languages, including Lithuanian, Latvian and extinct Old Prussian
- Balts (or Baltic peoples), ethnic groups speaking the Baltic languages and/or originating from the Baltic countries
- Baltic Germans, historical ethnic German minority in Latvia and Estonia
- Baltic Finnic peoples, the Finnic peoples historically inhabiting the area on the northeastern side of the Baltic sea

== Places ==
=== Northern Europe ===
- Baltic Sea, in Europe
- Baltic region, an ambiguous term referring to the general area surrounding the Baltic Sea
- Baltic states (also Baltic countries, Baltic nations, Baltics), a geopolitical term, currently referring to Estonia, Latvia and Lithuania
- Baltic Provinces or governorates, former parts of the Swedish Empire and then Russian Empire (in modern Latvia, Estonia)
- Baltic Shield, the exposed Precambrian northwest segment of the East European Craton
- Baltic Plate, an ancient tectonic plate that is now fused onto the Eurasian Plate

=== North America ===
- Baltic, Connecticut
- Baltic, Ohio
- Baltic, South Dakota

== Ships and related ==
- Baltic (steamship)
- Baltic (tug), a German emergency tow vessel
- CSS Baltic, an iron and cottonclad sidewheeler ship built in 1860
- HMS Baltic (1808), Royal Navy cutter, formerly the Russian Opyt
- Baltic Exchange, a UK company that operates as a marketplace for shipbrokers, ship owners and charterers
  - Baltic Dry Index, a daily shipping index published by the Baltic Exchange
- Baltic Fleet, the Russian Navy's presence in the Baltic Sea
- Baltic Shipyard in Saint Petersburg, one of the oldest shipyards in Russia

== Sport ==
- Baltic Cup (football), an international football tournament held between Estonia, Finland, Latvia and Lithuania
- Baltic League, a football club tournament held between the top club sides from Estonia, Latvia and Lithuania, defunct since 2011
- Baltic Basketball League, founded in 2004

== Other uses ==
- Baltics (poem), a 1974 long poem by Tomas Tranströmer
- Baltic Centre for Contemporary Art in Gateshead, UK
- Baltic State Opera, the Opera House in Gdańsk, Poland
- Baltic Mining Company, a copper mining operation in the Upper Peninsula of Michigan
- Baltic, a locomotive with a 4-6-4 wheel arrangement
- Baltic Express, an InterCity and EuroCity train connecting Gdynia to Prague

== See also ==
- Baltica (disambiguation)
- Baltiysk, town in Kaliningrad Oblast, Russia
- Baltiysky (disambiguation)
- Bałtyk, a building in Poznań, Poland
