= Baltic Express =

Polish Gdynia to Prague intercity train service

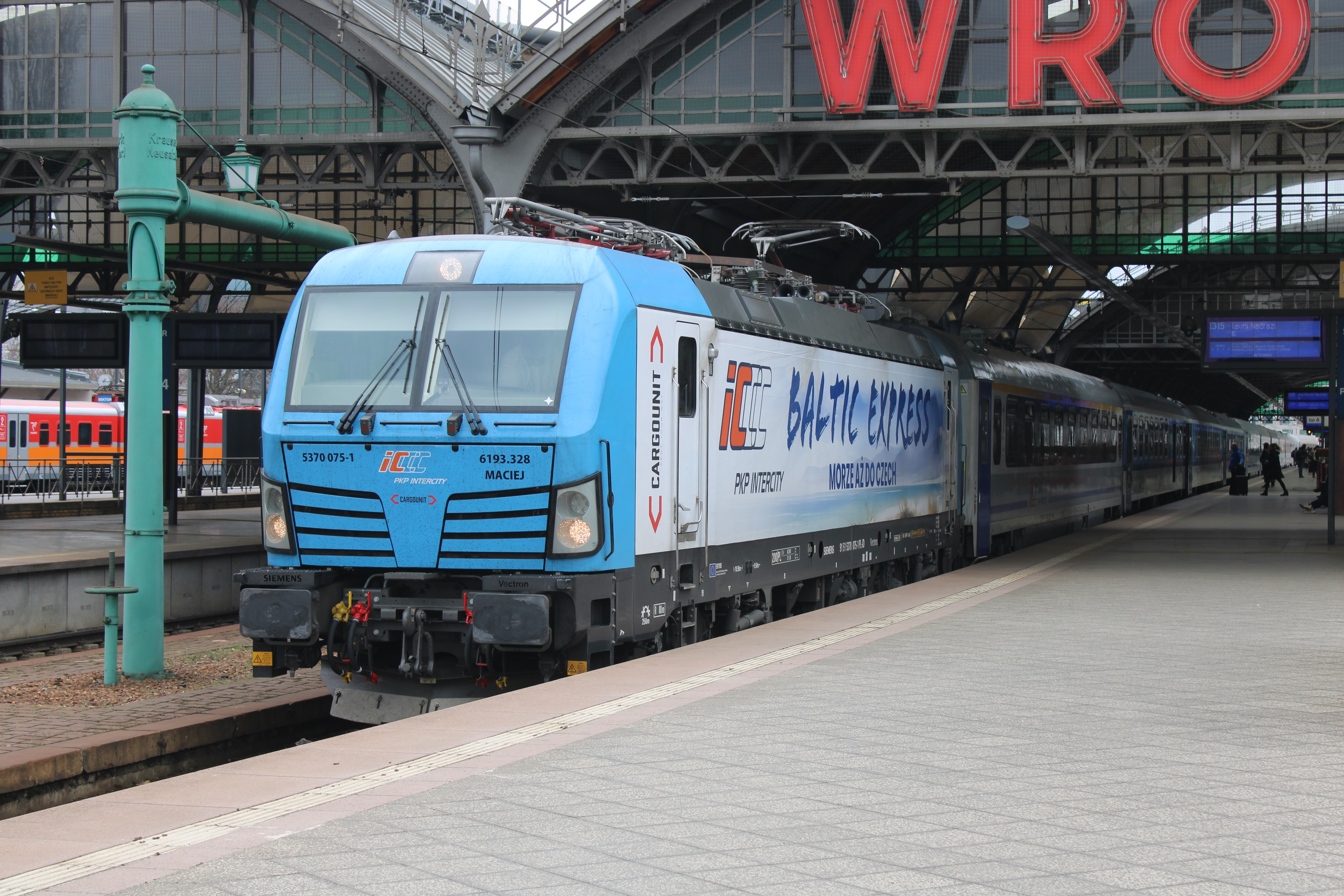
- A Baltic Express train hauled by Siemens Vectron "Maciej" locomotive at Wrocław Główny in March 2025

Overview
- Service type: InterCity (Poland); EuroCity (Czech Republic)
- Status: Operating
- Locale: Poland; Czech Republic
- First service: 15 December 2024
- Current operators: PKP Intercity, Czech Railways
- Ridership: 350,000 (annually)

Route
- Termini: Gdynia Główna; Praha hlavní nádraží
- Stops: 25; 42
- Distance travelled: 812 km (505 mi); 919 km (571 mi)
- Average journey time: 9 hours, 3 minutes 11 hours, 15 minutes
- Service frequency: Daily
- Train numbers: EC/IC 260 - 265; EC/IC 460 - 461
- Lines used: Gdańsk–Stargard; Warsaw–Gdańsk; Poznań–Skandawa; Kutno–Piła; Chorzów Batory–Tczew; Wrocław–Poznań; Wrocław–Międzylesie; Ústí nad Orlicí–Štíty; Kolín–Česká Třebová; Praha–Kolín

On-board services
- Classes: First class; Second class; Sleeper class
- Disabled access: Restricted for stations with high-level platforms
- Seating arrangements: 4 across, 3 across, 3 on the side, 6 in compartments (Second class); 4 across, 3 across, 6 in compartments (First class)
- Sleeping arrangements: 2 beds; 3 beds
- Catering facilities: Café in second class
- Baggage facilities: Overhead racks
- Other facilities: Bike hangers

Technical
- Track gauge: 1,435 mm (4 ft 8 1/2 in)
- Electrification: 3 kV DC
- Operating speed: 80 km/h–160 km/h (50 mph–100 mph)

The Baltic Express is an InterCity and EuroCity international express train service operated by PKP Intercity and Czech Railways in Poland and the Czech Republic. It runs between Gdynia and Prague, the Czech capital, via Wrocław. The train is classified as an intercity category in Poland, and as a EuroCity category in Czech Republic. The train works in cooperation between the Czech railways and the Polish railways, introduced on 15th December 2024.

== Route ==
The service begins up north in Poland from Gdynia to Prague operated by EC/IC 260–265 trains, and via Iława operated by EC/IC 460–461 trains. The following stops were made heading south in Gdańsk and Tczew. From Tczew, the 260–265 trains took the Chorzów Batory–Tczew line of the former Polish Coal Trunk Line to Bydgoszcz, and the 460–461 trains went through Toruń via Iława stopping at Malbork, Jabłonowo Pomorskie, Wąbrzeźno and Kowalewo Pomorskie, upon diverging east to Bydgoszcz from Tczew. Both trains took the same route from Bydgoszcz to Wrocław, but the 260–265 trains made frequently less stops than the 460–465 trains. At Wrocław Główny station, trains from Gdynia get coaches removed, and to Gdynia they get more coaches, 2 of them are removed/added to trains via Iława, and 5 of them removed/added to 260–265 trains. Heading south, the trains pass the Sudetes mountain range and enter the Czech Republic, where they shift east to Prague and finish the route.

== Timetable ==
=== EC/IC 260 - 265 ===
EC/IC 260			EC/IC 261			EC/IC 262			EC/IC 263			EC/IC 264			EC/IC 265		
Station	Arrival	Departure	Station	Arrival	Departure	Station	Arrival	Departure	Station	Arrival	Departure	Station	Arrival	Departure	Station	Arrival	Departure
Praha hlavní nádraží	—	14:45	Gdynia Główna	—	4:06	Praha hlavní nádraží	—	10:49	Gdynia Główna	—	8:06	Praha hlavní nádraží	—	6:49	Gdynia Główna	—	12:06
Praha-Liben	14:51	14:53	Sopot	4:13	4:15	Praha-Liben	10:55	10:57	Sopot	8:13	8:15	Praha-Liben	6:55	6:57	Sopot	12:13	12:15
Kolin	15:25	15:27	Gdańsk Oliwa	4:19	4:20	Kolin	11:30	11:32	Gdańsk Oliwa	8:19	8:20	Kolin	7:30	7:32	Gdańsk Oliwa	12:19	12:20
Pardubice hlavní nádraží	15:52	15:54	Gdańsk Wrzeszcz	4:23	4:24	Pardubice hlavní nádraží	11:52	11:54	Gdańsk Wrzeszcz	8:23	8:24	Pardubice hlavní nádraží	7:52	7:54	Gdańsk Wrzeszcz	12:23	12:24
Ústí nad Orlicí	16:23	16:27	Gdańsk Główny	4:29	4:32	Ústí nad Orlicí	12:23	12:27	Gdańsk Główny	8:29	8:32	Ústí nad Orlicí	8:23	8:27	Gdańsk Główny	12:29	12:32
Letohrad	16:38	16:39	Tczew	4:47	4:48	Letohrad	12:38	12:39	Tczew	8:47	8:48	Letohrad	8:38	8:39	Tczew	12:47	12:48
Jablonné nad Orlicí	16:47	16:48	Bydgoszcz Główna	5:54	5:57	Jablonné nad Orlicí	12:47	12:48	Bydgoszcz Główna	9:54	9:57	Jablonné nad Orlicí	8:47	8:48	Bydgoszcz Główna	13:54	13:57
Lichkov	17:02	17:02	Inowrocław	6:23	6:24	Lichkov	13:02	13:02	Inowrocław	10:23	10:24	Lichkov	9:02	9:02	Inowrocław	14:23	14:24
Międzylesie	17:11	17:17	Gniezno	6:53	6:54	Międzylesie	13:11	13:17	Gniezno	10:53	10:54	Międzylesie	9:11	9:17	Gniezno	14:53	14:54
Bystrzyca Kłodzka	17:29	17:30	Poznań Główny	7:20	7:31	Bystrzyca Kłodzka	13:29	13:30	Poznań Główny	11:20	11:31	Bystrzyca Kłodzka	9:29	9:30	Poznań Główny	15:20	15:31
Kłodzko Miasto	17:41	17:42	Leszno	8:03	8:04	Kłodzko Miasto	13:41	13:42	Leszno	12:03	12:04	Kłodzko Miasto	9:41	9:42	Leszno	16:03	16:04
Kamieniec Ząbkowicki	18:01	18:02	Wrocław Główny	8:48	9:13	Kamieniec Ząbkowicki	14:01	14:02	Wrocław Główny	12:48	13:13	Kamieniec Ząbkowicki	10:01	10:02	Wrocław Główny	16:48	17:13
Strzelin	18:23	18:24	Strzelin	9:36	9:37	Strzelin	14:23	14:24	Strzelin	13:36	13:37	Strzelin	10:23	10:24	Strzelin	17:36	17:37
Wrocław Główny	18:46	19:10	Kamieniec Ząbkowicki	9:57	9:58	Wrocław Główny	14:46	15:10	Kamieniec Ząbkowicki	13:57	13:58	Wrocław Główny	10:46	11:10	Kamieniec Ząbkowicki	17:57	17:58
Leszno	19:55	19:56	Kłodzko Miasto	10:17	10:18	Leszno	15:55	15:56	Kłodzko Miasto	14:17	14:18	Leszno	11:55	11:56	Kłodzko Miasto	18:17	18:18
Poznań Główny	20:30	20:40	Bystrzyca Kłodzka	10:29	10:30	Poznań Główny	16:28	16:40	Bystrzyca Kłodzka	14:29	14:30	Poznań Główny	12:29	12:40	Bystrzyca Kłodzka	18:29	18:30
Gniezno	21:06	21:07	Międzylesie	10:43	10:49	Gniezno	17:06	17:07	Międzylesie	14:43	14:49	Gniezno	13:06	13:07	Międzylesie	18:43	18:49
Inowrocław	21:35	21:36	Lichkov	10:57	10:57	Inowrocław	17:35	17:36	Lichkov	14:57	14:57	Inowrocław	13:35	13:36	Lichkov	18:57	18:57
Bydgoszcz Główna	22:01	22:04	Jablonné nad Orlicí	11:10	11:11	Bydgoszcz Główna	18:01	18:04	Jablonné nad Orlicí	15:10	15:11	Bydgoszcz Główna	14:01	14:04	Jablonné nad Orlicí	19:10	19:11
Tczew	23:11	23:12	Letohrad	11:19	11:20	Tczew	19:11	19:12	Letohrad	15:19	15:20	Tczew	15:11	15:12	Letohrad	19:19	19:20
Gdańsk Główny	23:27	23:30	Ústí nad Orlicí	11:32	11:34	Gdańsk Główny	19:27	19:30	Ústí nad Orlicí	15:32	15:34	Gdańsk Główny	15:27	15:30	Ústí nad Orlicí	19:32	19:34
Gdańsk Wrzeszcz	23:34	23:35	Pardubice hlavní nádraží	12:05	12:08	Gdańsk Wrzeszcz	19:34	19:35	Pardubice hlavní nádraží	16:05	16:08	Gdańsk Wrzeszcz	15:34	15:35	Pardubice hlavní nádraží	20:05	20:08
Gdańsk Oliwa	23:38	23:39	Kolin	12:32	12:34	Gdańsk Oliwa	19:38	19:39	Kolin	16:32	16:34	Gdańsk Oliwa	15:38	15:39	Kolin	20:32	20:34
Sopot	23:43	23:45	Praha-Liben	13:07	13:08	Sopot	19:43	19:45	Praha-Liben	17:07	17:08	Sopot	15:43	15:45	Praha-Liben	21:07	21:08
Gdynia Główna	23:53	—	Praha hlavní nádraží	13:14	—	Gdynia Główna	19:53	—	Praha hlavní nádraží	17:14	—	Gdynia Główna	15:53	—	Praha hlavní nádraží	21:14	—

=== EC/IC 460 - 461 ===
EC/IC 460			EC/IC 461		
Station	Arrival	Departure	Station	Arrival	Departure
Praha hlavní nádraží	—	18:49	Gdynia Główna	—	21:59
Praha-Liben	18:55	18:57	Sopot	22:06	22:08
Kolin	19:30	19:32	Gdańsk Oliwa	22:12	22:13
Pardubice hlavní nádraží	19:52	19:54	Gdańsk Wrzeszcz	22:16	22:17
Ústí nad Orlicí	20:23	20:27	Gdańsk Główny	22:21	22:24
Letohrad	20:38	20:39	Tczew	22:39	22:40
Jablonné nad Orlicí	20:47	20:58	Malbork	22:51	22:52
Lichkov	21:02	21:02	Prabuty	23:11	23:12
Międzylesie	21:11	21:17	Iława Główna	23:29	23:30
Bystrzyca Kłodzka	21:29	21:30	Jabłonowo Pomorskie	23:52	23:53
Kłodzko Miasto	21:41	21:42	Wąbrzeźno	0:05	0:06
Kamieniec Ząbkowicki	22:01	22:02	Kowalewo Pomorskie	00:14	00:15
Strzelin	22:23	22:24	Toruń Wschodni	0:28	0:29
Wrocław Główny	22:46	23:30	Toruń Miasto	0:33	0:34
Oborniki Śląskie	23:44	23:45	Toruń Główny	0:37	0:39
Żmigród	23:55	23:56	Solec Kujawski	0:59	1:00
Rawicz	0:05	0:06	Bydgoszcz Wschód	1:07	1:08
Leszno	0:21	0:22	Bydgoszcz Leśna	1:12	1:13
Kościan	0:35	0:36	Bydgoszcz Główna	1:18	1:21
Poznań Główny	0:58	1:14	Inowrocław	1:46	1:47
Gniezno	1:41	1:42	Mogilno	2:03	2:04
Mogilno	1:58	1:59	Gniezno	2:18	2:20
Inowrocław	2:14	2:15	Poznań Główny	2:48	2:53
Bydgoszcz Główna	2:41	2:44	Kościan	3:14	3:15
Bydgoszcz Leśna	2:48	2:49	Leszno	3:28	3:29
Bydgoszcz Wschód	2:52	2:53	Rawicz	3:44	3:45
Solec Kujawski	3:01	3:02	Żmigród	3:53	3:54
Toruń Główny	3:24	3:26	Oborniki Śląskie	4:04	4:05
Toruń Miasto	3:29	3:30	Wrocław Główny	4:20	5:13
Toruń Wschodni	3:33	3:34	Strzelin	5:36	5:37
Kowalewo Pomorskie	3:47	3:48	Kamieniec Ząbkowicki	5:57	5:58
Wąbrzeźno	3:56	3:57	Kłodzko Miasto	6:17	6:18
Jabłonowo Pomorskie	4:08	4:09	Bystrzyca Kłodzka	6:29	6:30
Iława Główna	4:32	4:33	Międzylesie	6:43	6:49
Prabuty	4:49	4:50	Lichkov	6:57	6:57
Malbork	5:08	5:09	Jablonné nad Orlicí	7:10	7:11
Tczew	5:20	5:21	Letohrad	7:19	7:20
Gdańsk Główny	5:36	5:39	Ústí nad Orlicí	7:32	7:34
Gdańsk Wrzeszcz	5:43	5:44	Pardubice hlavní nádraží	8:05	8:08
Gdańsk Oliwa	5:47	5:48	Kolin	8:32	8:34
Sopot	5:52	5:53	Praha-Liben	9:07	9:08
Gdynia Główna	6:01	—	Praha hlavní nádraží	9:14	—

== Formation ==
=== EC/IC 260 - 265 ===
Train number(s)	Date	Locomotive	1st coach	2nd coach	3rd coach	4th coach	5th coach	6th coach	7th coach	8th coach	9th coach	10th coach
260, 262, 264	14.12.2025 - 29.5.2026	Siemens Vectron 193	Bdmpee^{233}	Bdmpee^{233}	Bbdgmee^{236}	ARmpee829	A^{9}mnouz	A^{9}nouz	B^{6}bnouvz	B^{9}nopuz	B^{9}nopuz	B^{9}nopuz
260, 262, 264	14.12.2025 - 29.5.2026	Praha hl. n. - Gdynia Gł.						Wrocław Gł. - Gdynia Gł.				
260, 262, 264	30.5.2026 - 12.12.2026	Siemens Vectron 193	Bdmpee^{233}	Bdmpee^{233}	Bbdgmee^{236}	ARmpee829	A^{9}mnouz	B^{6}bnouvz	B^{10}nouz	B^{10}nouz	B^{10}nouz	B^{10}nouz
260, 262, 264	30.5.2026 - 12.12.2026	Praha hl. n. - Gdynia Gł.						Wrocław Gł. - Gdynia Gł.				
261, 263, 265	14.12.2025 - 29.5.2026	Siemens Vectron 193	A^{9}mnouz	ARmpee^{829}	Bbdgmee^{236}	Bdmpee^{233}	Bdmpee^{233}	B^{9}nopuz	B^{9}nopuz	B^{9}nopuz	B^{6}bnouvz	A^{9}nouz
261, 263, 265	14.12.2025 - 29.5.2026	Gdynia Gł. - Praha hl. n.						Gdynia Gł. - Wrocław Gł.				
261, 263, 265	30.5.2026 - 12.12.2026	Siemens Vectron 193	A^{9}mnouz	ARmpee^{829}	Bbdgmee^{236}	Bdmpee^{233}	Bdmpee^{233}	B^{10}nouz	B^{10}nouz	B^{10}nouz	B^{10}nouz	B^{6}bnouvz
261, 263, 265	30.5.2026 - 12.12.2026	Gdynia Gł. - Praha hl. n.						Gdynia Gł. - Wrocław Gł.				

=== EC/IC 460 - 461 ===
Train number	Date	Locomotive	1st coach	2nd coach	3rd coach	4th coach	5th coach	6th coach	7th coach	8th coach	9th coach
460	14.12.2025 - 14.1.2026	Siemens Vectron 193	B^{10}nouz	B^{10}nouz	Bdmpee^{233}	Bdmpee^{233}	Bbdgmee^{236}	ARmpee^{829}	A^{9}mnouz	WLAB^{9}(b)mnouz	Bcmz^{834}
460	14.12.2025 - 14.1.2026	Praha hl. n. - Gdynia Gł.	Wrocław Gł. - Gdynia Gł.		Praha hl. n. - Gdynia Gł.						
460	15.1.2026 - 1.3.2026	Siemens Vectron 193	WLAB^{9}(b)mnouz	Bdmpee^{233}	Bdmpee^{233}	Bbdgmee^{236}	ARmpee^{829}	A^{9}mnouz	B^{10}nouz	B^{10}nouz	—
460	15.1.2026 - 1.3.2026	Praha hl. n. - Gdynia Gł.	Wrocław Gł. - Gdynia Gł.		Praha hl. n. - Gdynia Gł.						
460	2.3.2026 - 12.12.2026	Siemens Vectron 193	Bcmz^{834}	WLAB^{9}(b)mnouz	Bdmpee^{233}	Bdmpee^{233}	Bbdgmee^{236}	ARmpee^{829}	A^{9}mnouz	B^{10}nouz	B^{10}nouz
460	2.3.2026 - 12.12.2026	Praha hl. n. - Gdynia Gł.	Wrocław Gł. - Gdynia Gł.		Praha hl. n. - Gdynia Gł.						
461	14.12.2025 - 14.1.2026	Siemens Vectron 193	Bcmz^{834}	WLAB^{9}(b)mnouz	A^{9}mnouz	ARmpee^{829}	Bbdgmee^{236}	Bdmpee^{233}	Bdmpee^{233}	B^{10}nouz	B^{10}nouz
461	14.12.2025 - 14.1.2026	Gdynia Gł. - Praha hl. n.								Gdynia Gł. - Wrocław Gł.	
461	15.1.2026 - 1.3.2026	Siemens Vectron 193	B^{10}nouz	B^{10}nouz	A^{9}mnouz	ARmpee^{829}	Bbdgmee^{236}	Bdmpee^{233}	Bdmpee^{233}	WLAB^{9}(b)mnouz	—
461	15.1.2026 - 1.3.2026	Gdynia Gł. - Praha hl. n.	Gdynia Gł. - Wrocław Gł.		Gdynia Gł. - Praha hl. n.						
461	2.3.2026 - 12.12.2026	Siemens Vectron 193	B^{10}nouz	B^{10}nouz	A^{9}mnouz	ARmpee^{829}	Bbdgmee^{236}	Bdmpee^{233}	Bdmpee^{233}	WLAB^{9}(b)mnouz	Bcmz^{834}
461	2.3.2026 - 12.12.2026	Gdynia Gł. - Praha hl. n.	Gdynia Gł. - Wrocław Gł.		Gdynia Gł. - Praha hl. n.						

== See also ==
- List of EuroCity services
- List of named passenger trains of Europe
