= Baltica (disambiguation) =

Baltica, or Baltika, refers to the Baltic region. It may refer to:

- Baltica, an ancient continent.
- The Baltic states: Estonia, Latvia, Lithuania.
- Baltika Breweries, the largest brewery in Eastern Europe.
- Baltika Group, Estonian fashion brandhouse and retailer.
- Baltica (festival), folklore festival in Baltic states.
- Baltica (computer), a Soviet/Russian clone of ZX Spectrum.
- FC Baltika Kaliningrad, a football (soccer) club.
- Baltika, a Russian icebreaker.

== See also ==
- Baltic (disambiguation)
