= Mimowola–Jaksice railway =

Railway line in Poland

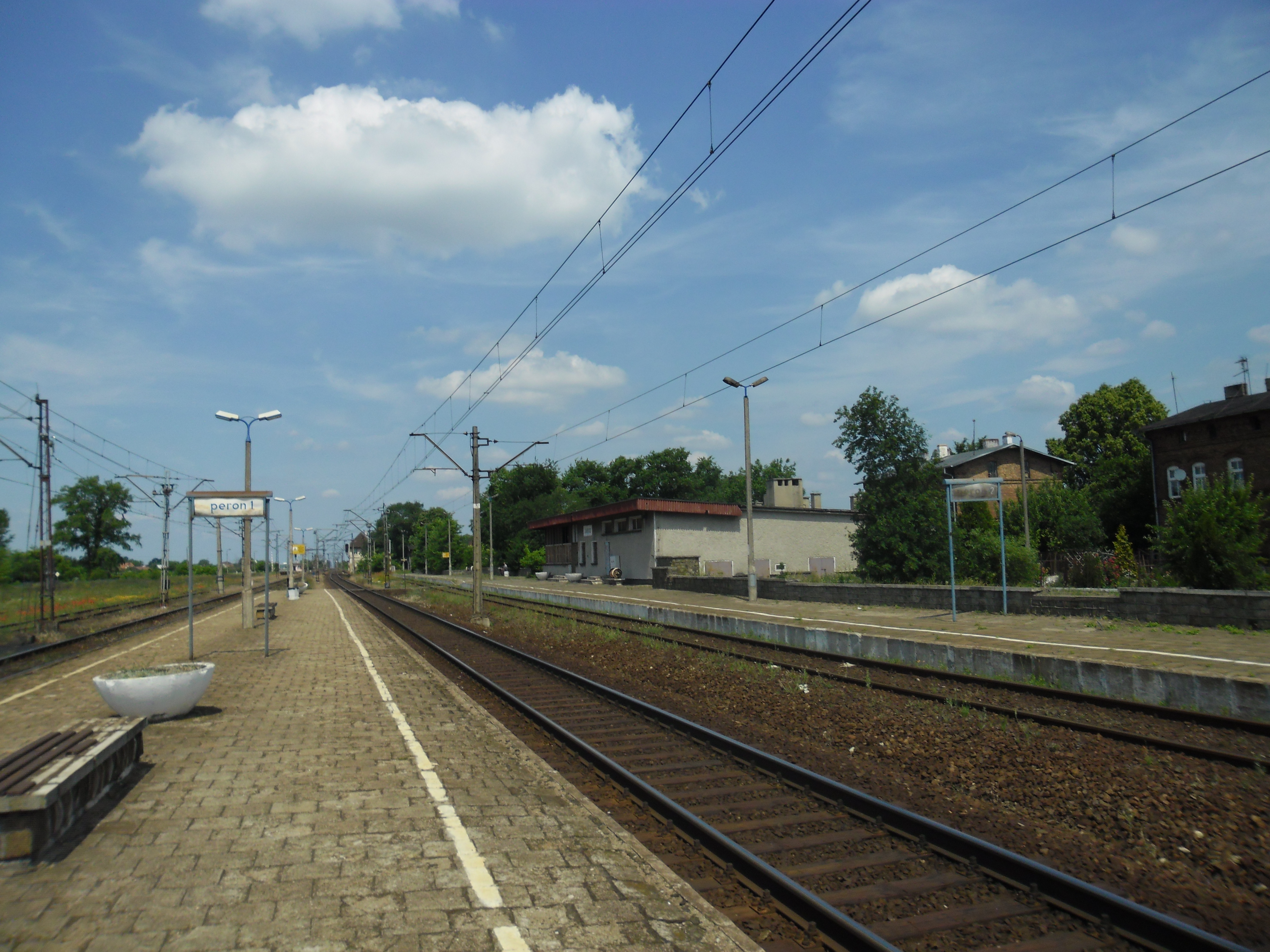
- Jaksice railway station

Overview
- Owner: PKP Polskie Linie Kolejowe
- Line number: 741
- Termini: Mimowola; Jaksice

History
- Opened: 1941

Technical
- Line length: 8.198 km (5.094 mi)
- Track gauge: 1,435 mm (4 ft 8 1/2 in)
- Operating speed: 100 km/h (62 mph)

Mimowola–Jaksice railway is a railway in Poland connecting the Mimowola junction and Jaksice railway station. This line allows trains to bypass Inowrocław railway station, which is utilized by both freight and passenger trains, including express services.

== Route ==
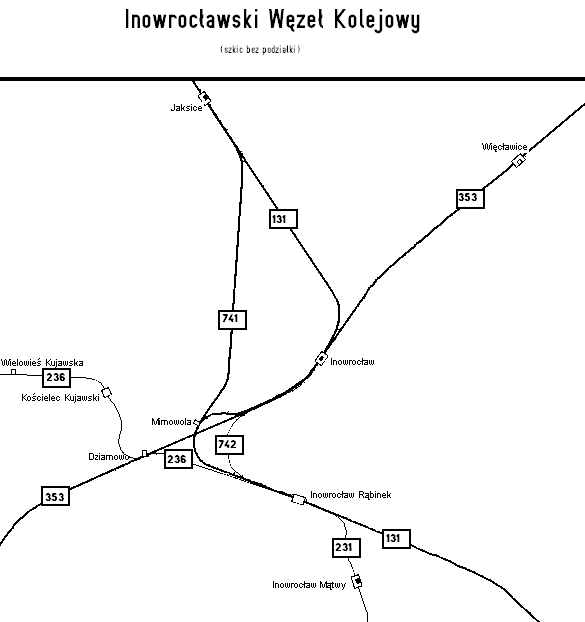
Inowrocław Railway Junction

Mimowola–Jaksice railway is part of the Inowrocław Railway Junction. The route begins at the Mimowola junction (currently remotely controlled from Inowrocław Towarowy railway station), located west of Inowrocław. It then runs northward with a slight eastward deviation. Near Chorzów Batory–Tczew railway, the line curves northwest and runs parallel to Chorzów Batory–Tczew railway for about a kilometer, creating a four-track section. The line ends after 8.198 km at Jaksice railway station, located north of the city.

The entire line is situated within Inowrocław County.

== History ==
=== Polish Coal Trunk-Line ===
In 1933, the Polish Coal Trunk-Line was opened, connecting the Upper Silesian Industrial Region with the Port of Gdynia. Near Inowrocław, the trunk-line followed Chorzów Batory–Tczew railway, passing through the city and Inowrocław railway station. Even during its construction, bypassing Inowrocław for freight trains was considered.

=== Construction ===
The Polish Coal Trunk-Line was destroyed during the September Campaign. Due to its economic importance to the Reich, it was rebuilt and modernized. On 1 June 1941, a decision was made to reconstruct the Inowrocław Railway Junction and build a line that would bypass Inowrocław railway station. The construction of the line took less than two months.

=== Further operation ===
The railway built by the occupiers continues to serve freight trains bypassing Inowrocław railway station. In 1967, along with the electrification of Chorzów Batory–Tczew railway, Mimowola–Jaksice railway was also electrified.

In the 1970s, a Polish record for the heaviest train was set on the Tarnowskie Góry–Tricity route (probably to Northern Port in Gdańsk), reaching a gross weight of 4,180 tons (net weight of 3,040 tons). These trains bypassed Inowrocław using Mimowola–Jaksice railway.

== Infrastructure ==
The line is entirely double-tracked and electrified. It has only one railway station, Jaksice. The maximum speed on the entire line is 80 km/h for freight trains and 100 km/h for passenger trains. The line features one engineering structure – a viaduct over the old trackbed of the former line connecting Inowrocław with Żnin. This line was reconstructed in 1965 on the Dziarnowo–Kościelec Kujawski section. Mimowola–Jaksice railway is equipped with automatic block signaling synchronized with stop signals.

== Train operations ==
Mimowola–Jaksice railway is used by freight trains bypassing Inowrocław railway station. Since December 2011, the line has also been used by Twoje Linie Kolejowe services, including the Kaszub, Artus, and Neptun trains operating on the Warszawa Wschodnia–Gdynia Główna route.

== Bibliography ==
- Kotlarz, Grzegorz; Dąbrowski, Henryk; Wieczorek, Edward (2008). Magistrala Węglowa [Coal Trunk-Line] (in Polish). Rybnik: Eurosprinter. ISBN 978-83-926946-0-1.
