= Baltiysky =

Baltiysky (masculine), Baltiyskaya (feminine), or Baltiyskoye (neuter) may refer to:

- Baltiysky District, several districts and city districts in Russia
- Baltiyskoye Urban Settlement, a municipal formation which the town of district significance of Baltiysk in Baltiysky District of Kaliningrad Oblast, Russia is incorporated as
- Baltiysky (inhabited locality) (Baltiyskaya, Baltiyskoye), several rural localities in Russia
- Baltiysky railway station, a railway terminal in St. Petersburg, Russia
- Baltiyskaya Nuclear Power Plant, or Kaliningrad Nuclear Power Plant, a nuclear power plant under construction on the Neman River in Kaliningrad Oblast, Russia
- Baltiyskaya (Saint Petersburg Metro), an underground metro station adjacent to Baltiysky railway station in St. Petersburg, Russia
