= Chorzów Batory–Tczew railway =

Railway line in Poland

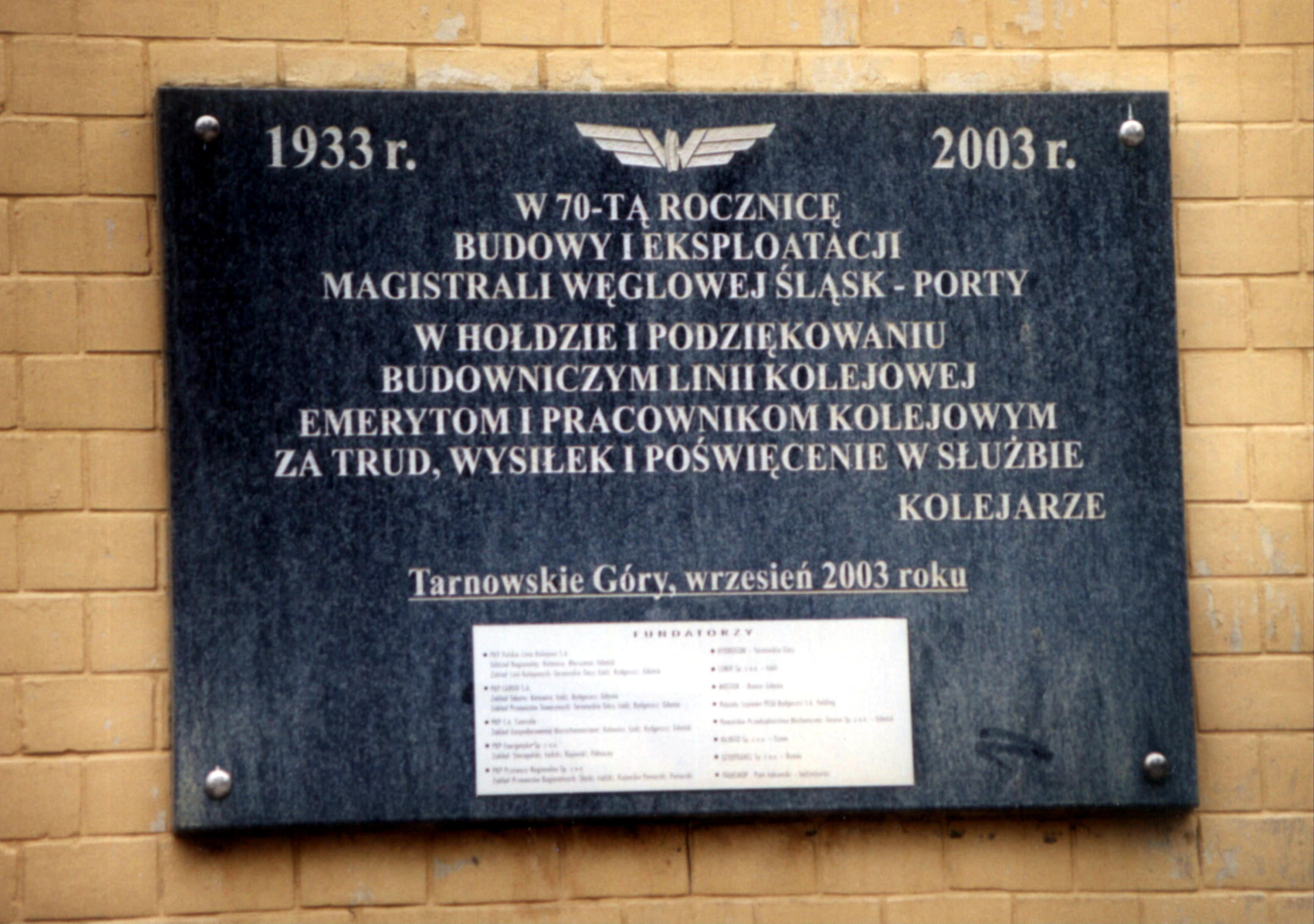
- Plaque commemorating the 70th anniversary of the construction of the Polish Coal Trunk-Line on the Tarnowskie Góry station building

Overview
- Owner: PKP Polskie Linie Kolejowe
- Line number: 131
- Termini: Chorzów Batory; Tczew

History
- Opened: 1852–1933 (opened in sections, fully operational in 1933); 1974 (opening of the western realignment Chorzów Miasto–Chorzów Batory)

Technical
- Line length: 493.472 km (306.629 mi)
- Track gauge: 1,435 mm (4 ft 8 1/2 in)
- Operating speed: 160 km/h (99 mph)
Route map

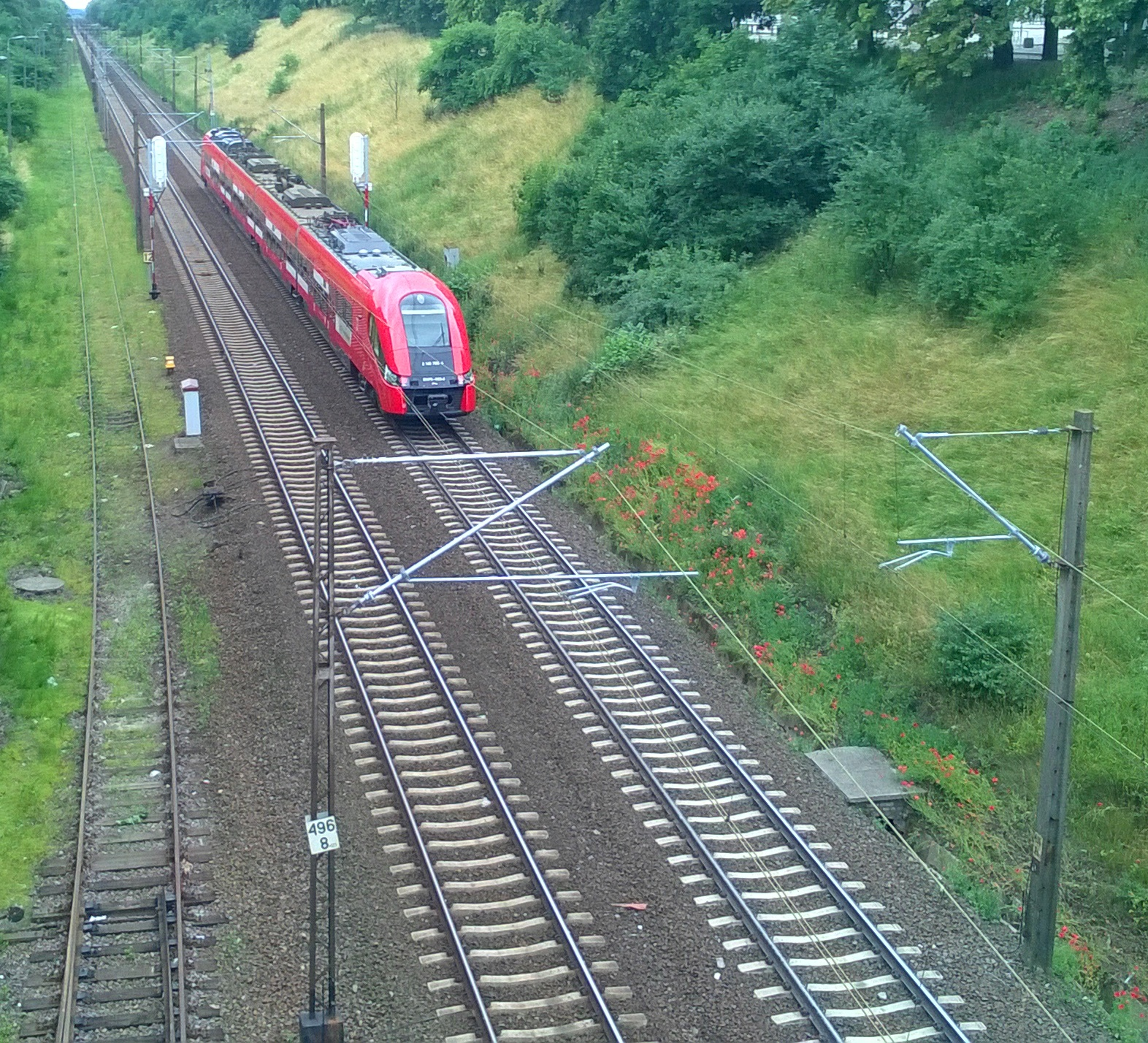
Fragment of the Chorzów Batory–Tczew railway in Tczew

Chorzów Batory–Tczew railway is a railway line in Poland connecting the Upper Silesian and Częstochowa industrial regions, as well as the Rybnik Coal Area, with the railway hub in Tczew, and further with the Port of Gdańsk and the Port of Gdynia. It was built primarily as a freight line, which is why it bypasses major cities (except for Bydgoszcz). The line runs through five voivodeships and 18 counties. It largely overlaps with one of the most important infrastructure investments of the Second Polish Republic – the Polish Coal Trunk-Line.

Chorzów Batory–Tczew railway was constructed and opened in sections between 1852 and 1933, with finishing works on accompanying infrastructure continuing until 1935. The line was electrified between 1965 and 1974.

It is the longest (493.472 km) railway line managed by PKP Polskie Linie Kolejowe. It is a mainline railway, almost entirely double-tracked, standard-gauge, electrified, and of both national and European significance as part of corridor C-E 65.

== Route ==
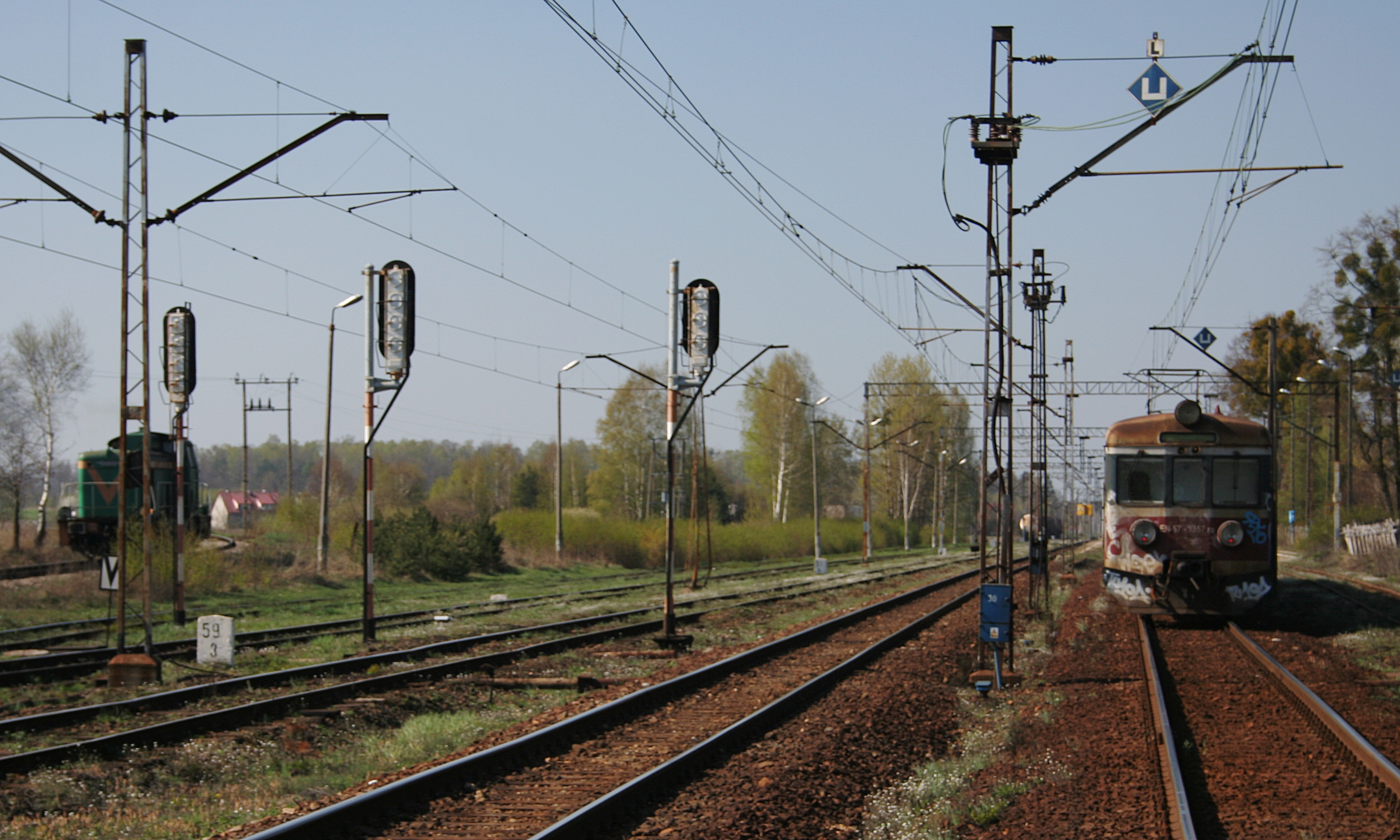
At kilometer 59.3, the Chorzów Batory–Tczew railway passes through Boronów

The line begins in Chorzów Batory, where it passes under Katowice–Legnica railway via a viaduct, turns northeast, and then passes under the viaduct of Drogowa Trasa Średnicowa. Since 1978, the starting point of the line has been located on the western side of the station because in 1974, following the construction of Drogowa Trasa Średnicowa, the line had to be relocated to a newly built section due to its original collision with the roadway. The old section of the line began approximately at the height of the Chorzów Batory railway station platforms, making a sharp turn into a straight section toward Chorzów Miasto railway station. After passing the junction of the old and new sections, the line first turns east, then north, and then northwest. Passing through the Bytom and Bytom Karb railway stations, the line runs north, veering eastward toward Radzionków and westward toward Tarnowskie Góry. At Miasteczko Śląskie, it finally takes a northern direction. After passing Kalety, it turns slightly east, then northwest before Boronów. After passing the junction at Herby Nowe railway station, it turns northeast.

After Wręczyca Wielka, the line heads increasingly north. Near Więcki, it bends northwest. At Trębaczew, it turns northeast. At Huta, the line runs north again, but between Chociw Łaski and Siedlce Łaskie railway stations, it takes a northeastern direction. Before reaching Zduńska Wola, the route bends northwest. After crossing the junction there, it runs north, with slight deviations west and east before returning westward. After Kłudna railway station, the line turns northwest, taking an increasingly western course. At Inowrocław, it sharply turns northeast before veering northwest again. Freight trains and some TLK passenger trains operated by PKP Intercity use Mimowola–Jaksice railway to bypass Inowrocław from the west. Upon reaching Trzciniec, the line turns north and enters the Bydgoszcz Railway Hub. Near Czyżkówko, it bends east, and after passing Bydgoszcz Główna railway station, it turns north again. Past Rynków, it shifts northeast, with minor deviations to the right and left. Between Warlubie and Smętowo, it turns north. Before reaching Pelplin, it takes a northeastern course until it reaches Tczew Południe station. Just before Tczew railway station, the line turns northwest.

The railway runs through the following counties: Chorzów, Bytom, Tarnowskie Góry, Lubliniec, Kłobuck, Pajęczno, Bełchatów, Łask, Zduńska Wola, Poddębice, Koło, Konin, Radziejów, Inowrocław, Bydgoszcz, Świecie, Starogard, and Tczew.

The line is divided into 21 sections:

- A: Chorzów Batory – Chorzów Stary (km 5.440–12.210)
- B: Chorzów Stary – Bytom Karb (km 12.210–20.056)
- C: Bytom Karb – Nakło Śląskie (km 20.056–30.143)
- D: Nakło Śląskie – Tarnowskie Góry (km 30.143–33.882)
- E: Tarnowskie Góry – Tarnowskie Góry TGE (km 33.882–39.900)
- F: Tarnowskie Góry TGE – Kalety (km 39.900–47.966)
- G: Kalety – Kalina (km 47.966–67.099)
- H: Kalina – Chorzew Siemkowice (km 67.099–124.172)
- J: Chorzew Siemkowice – Zduńska Wola Karsznice (km 124.172–168.803)
- K: Zduńska Wola Karsznice – Dionizów (km 168.803–173.653)
- L: Dionizów – Ponętów (km 173.653–240.456)
- M: Ponętów – Inowrocław Rąbinek (km 240.456–317.048)
- N: Inowrocław Rąbinek – Mimowola (km 317.048–321.040)
- O: Mimowola – Inowrocław (km 321.040–324.936)
- P: Inowrocław – Jaksice (km 324.936–331.651)
- R: Jaksice – Nowa Wieś Wielka (km 331.651–346.082)
- S: Nowa Wieś Wielka – Bydgoszcz Główna (km 346.082–370.310)
- T: Bydgoszcz Główna – Maksymilianowo (km 370.310–379.848)
- U: Maksymilianowo – Laskowice Pomorskie (km 379.848–422.552)
- W: Laskowice Pomorskie – Górki (km 422.552–494.077)
- Z: Górki – Tczew (km 494.077–498.912)

== History ==
=== Before the construction of the Polish Coal Trunk-Line ===
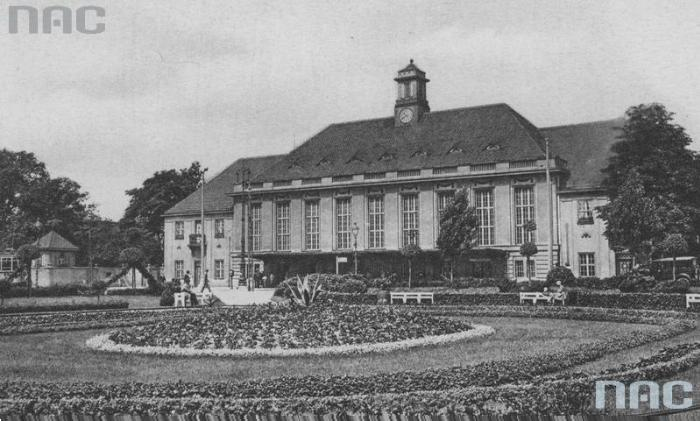
Old Bydgoszcz Główna railway station, in operation from 1915 to 1968

Chorzów Batory–Tczew railway is a major part of the interwar Polish Coal Trunk-Line, which connected Upper Silesia with the Port of Gdynia, bypassing the territory of the Free City of Danzig. A change was made to the northern section of the line, north of Nowa Wieś Wielka. The original Polish Coal Trunk-Line ran from this station along Nowa Wieś Wielka–Gdynia Port railway. The purpose of the line led to bypassing Łódź, which was located several dozen kilometers away. The only large city the line passed through was Bydgoszcz, although the route ran through the city's peripheral eastern part.

The first section of what would become Chorzów Batory–Tczew railway was the line connecting Bydgoszcz Główna with Tczew (and onward to Gdańsk), which was opened on 5 August 1852. In subsequent years, sections in Upper Silesia were opened: on 15 September 1859, the section from Bytom Karb to Tarnowskie Góry was opened, followed by the opening of the Chorzów Batory–Chorzów Miasto section on 15 August 1860. On 26 May 1872, the Bydgoszcz–Inowrocław section was opened. Further sections were opened in Silesia: on 1 October 1890, the Bytom–Bytom Karb section; on 1 May 1895, the Chorzów Stary–Bytom section; and on 1 May 1903, the Chorzów Miasto–Chorzów Stary section. By the early 20th century, the future Chorzów Batory–Tczew railway was completed between Chorzów Batory and Kalety, and between Inowrocław and Tczew. In the following period, until the construction of the Polish Coal Trunk-Line, the route was expanded to a double-track system on both sections.

=== Construction ===
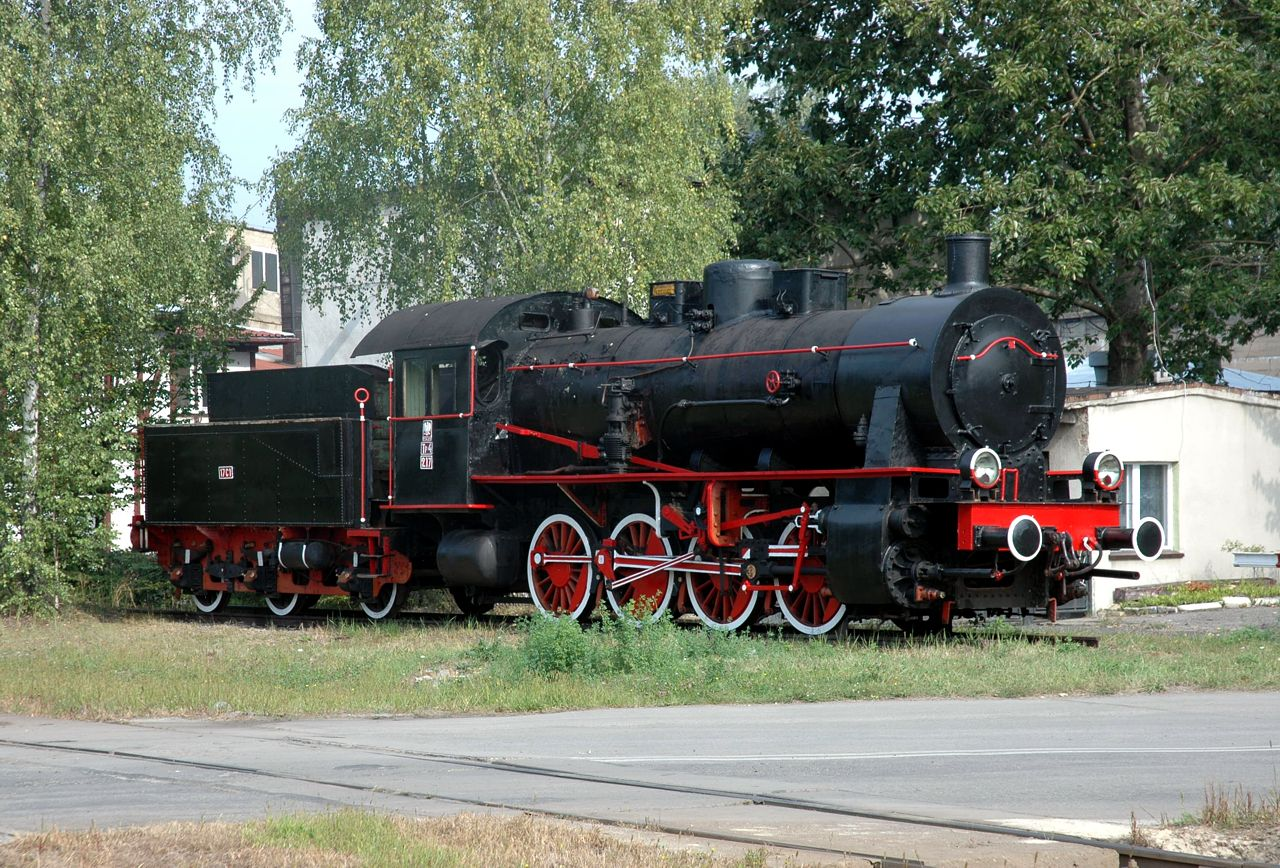
Tp4 – one of the first series of locomotives on the Polish Coal Trunk-Line

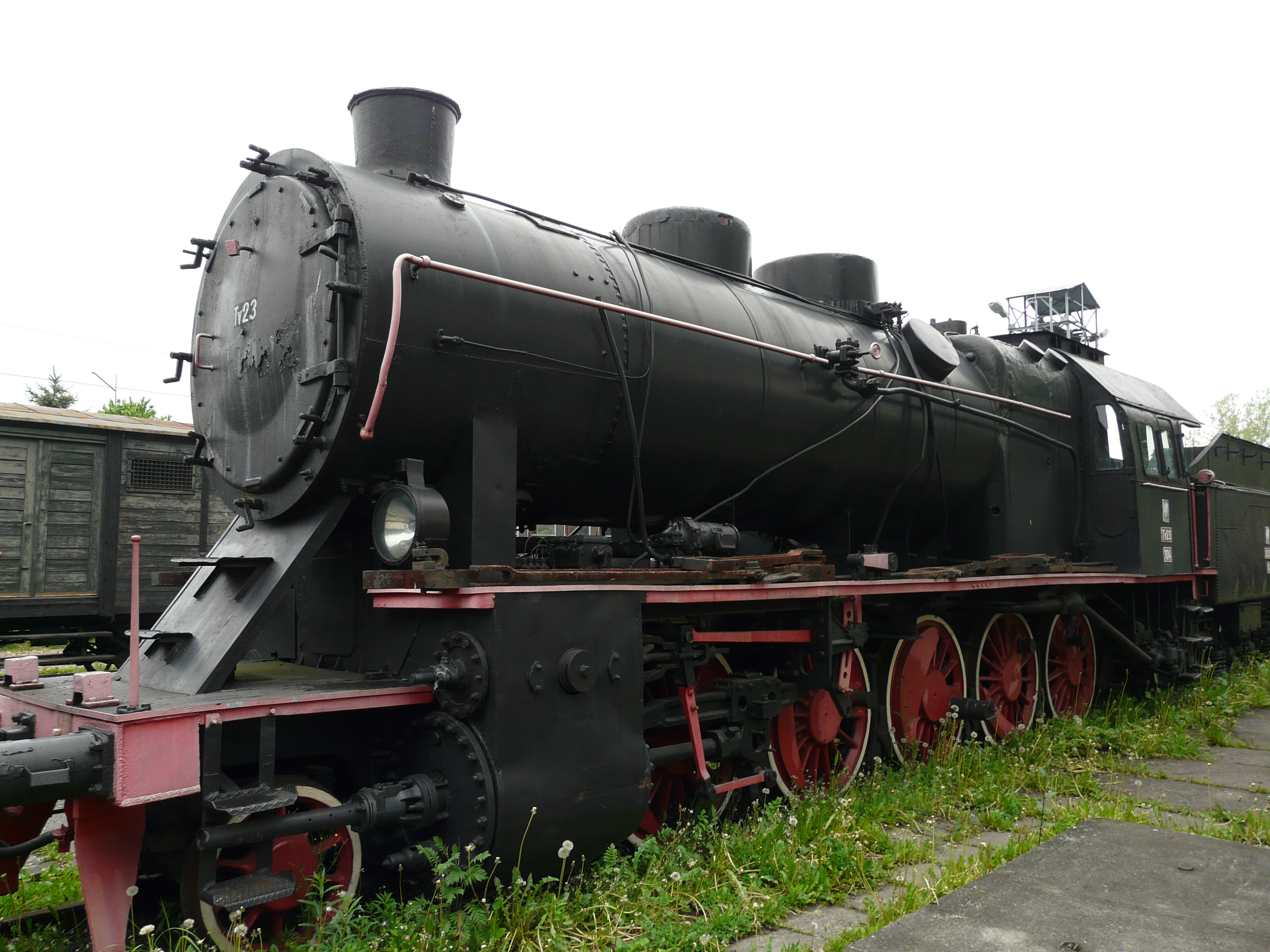
Ty23 – another early series of locomotives on the Polish Coal Trunk-Line

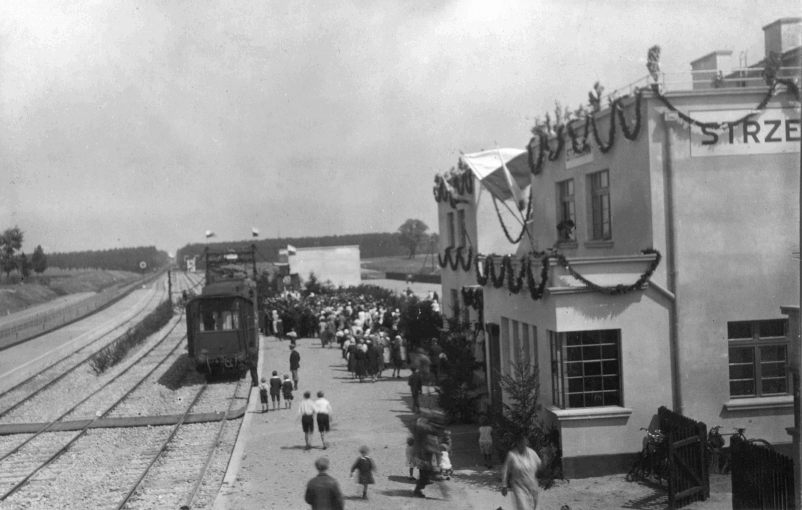
Opening of the Strzebin railway station

On 4 July 1924, Władysław Grabski signed an agreement with the Franco-Polish Consortium (the northern section was to be constructed by the state). The impetus for the construction of the trunk-line facilitating maritime exports was the customs war between Poland and Germany. At that time, Poland had a significant coal surplus compared to its own needs and lacked the capacity to export it to neighboring countries other than Germany. Another reason the trunk-line was vital was the opportunity for transit, particularly from Czechoslovakia, which had no access to the sea, but also from Romania and Bulgaria, where access to the Baltic was better than exporting through the Black Sea or Yugoslavia. Additionally, the government established preferential railway transport rates, which were lower than the costs of transport through Warsaw (due to distance).

In 1924, earthworks began on the Polish Coal Trunk-Line between Kalety and Inowrocław. In 1925, the track layout in Tarnowskie Góry was rebuilt to accommodate trains with up to 150 axles. On 6 November 1926, the first section of the Polish Coal Trunk-Line, connecting Kalety with Podzamcze (line 131 from Kalety to Nowe Herby), was opened. The line was built as a single-track route, but all excavations and larger bridge abutments were made in preparation for a double-track system. This section shortened the route by redirecting freight to Częstochowa. Initially, the line was used only for freight, and passenger trains began operating on it on 1 April 1927. The 1926 UK miners' strike led to an increased demand for coal transport in Poland, prompting the modernization of the Tczew railway station to handle more freight cars. Due to favorable market conditions and transport needs, a 255-kilometer section was built, connecting Herby to Inowrocław. Other lines were also constructed, including the Bydgoszcz–Gdynia route via Kościerzyna and the bypass of Bydgoszcz Główna. The decision to build the section from Herby to Inowrocław was officially made on 7 February 1928, under a decree by President Ignacy Mościcki, despite the fact that much of the earthworks had already been completed.

The economic crisis, however, meant that the state lacked sufficient funds to complete the investment and had to allocate resources for the repair of existing lines. To save the project, there were considerations, including the sale of shares in the Bank Polski, which met with government opposition. In 1930, Polish State Railways' revenues dropped significantly, and under pressure, the government began negotiations with French investors, who, due to long-standing political contacts between France and Poland, agreed to complete the line using their own funds in exchange for a concession to operate the line. Additionally, the French–Polish Rail Association was founded by the Schneider et Co. group, which was involved in the construction of the Gdynia port and had interests in mines and steelworks in Upper Silesia. The company had 8 million French francs and 7 million Polish francs in capital, and bonds were issued to cover the remaining construction costs.

On 8 November 1930, the section from Herby Nowe to Zduńska Wola Karsznice was opened. This line connected with the route from Łódź to Kalisz, further shortening the journey from Upper Silesia to the Port. However, in the long term, this line was intended to supply the Łódź agglomeration with coal. Due to the significant distance between Tarnowskie Góry and Bydgoszcz, a previously unplanned locomotive depot was built between 1930 and 1931. The opening of this section reduced travel time by 60 hours.

By 31 December 1932, the Polish Coal Trunk-Line was expected to be open and passable from Chorzów to Gdynia. However, due to the disruption of work caused by lack of funds, the completion of the section from Zduńska Wola to Inowrocław was delayed until 1 March 1933. The opening of the final section was marked by a grand ceremony highlighting Polish-French cooperation. The event started in Karsznice, and delegates then traveled by train to Bydgoszcz for the second part of the celebrations. Final works on the infrastructure continued for several years after the line became operational.

=== World War II ===
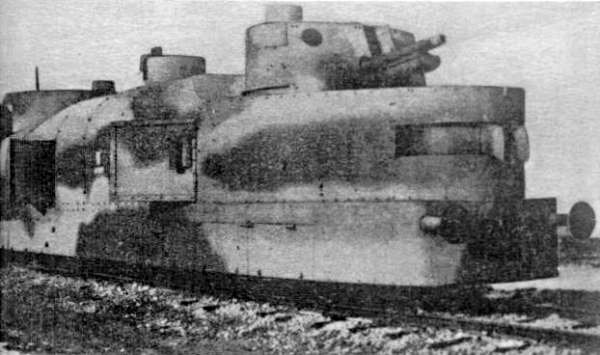
Artillery wagon of the armored train Śmiały

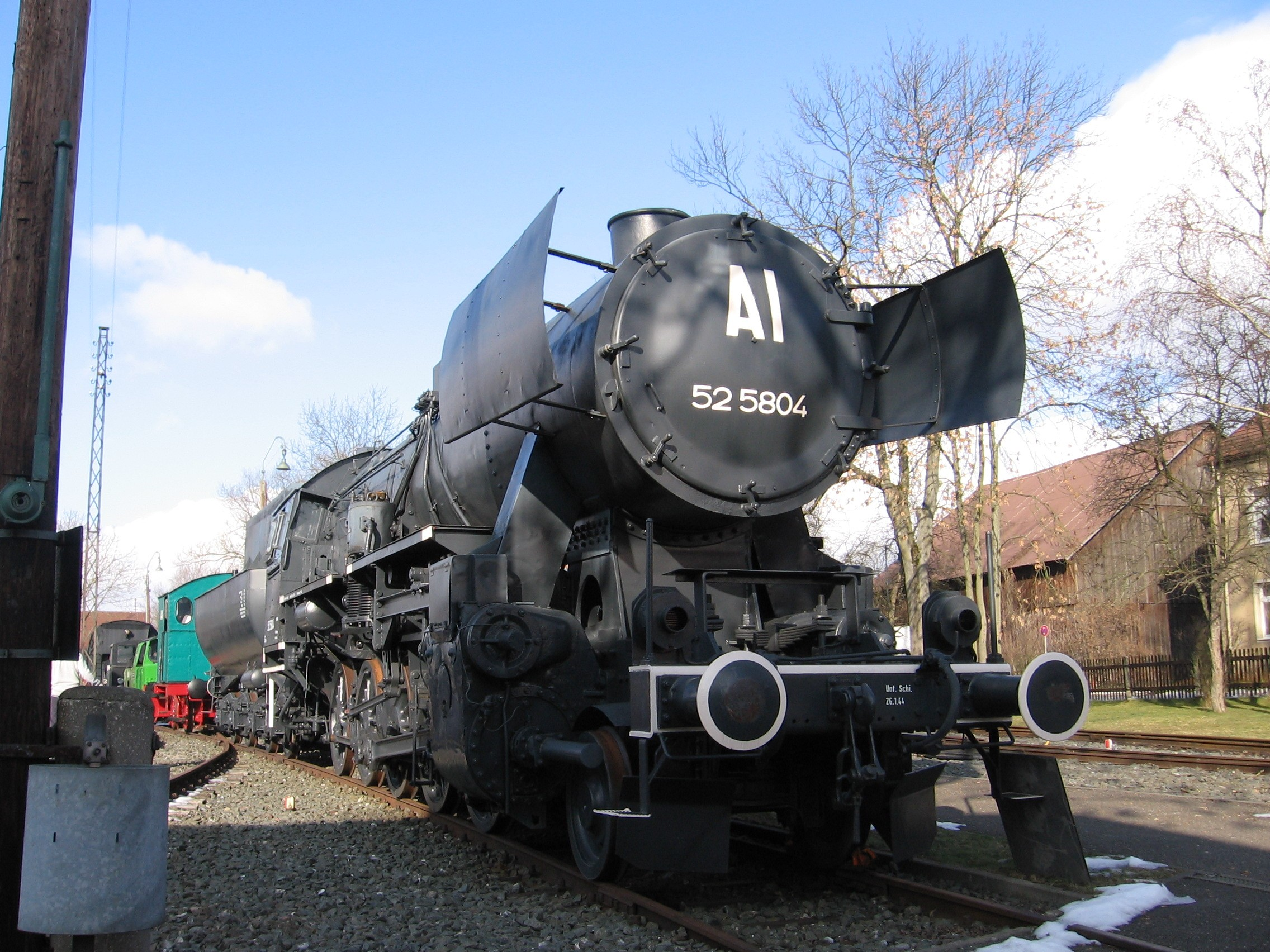
BR52 in wartime livery

On 25 August 1939, the railway was militarized, and by 28 August, the armored train Śmiały had begun operating. On the night of 31 August to 1 September, the wartime timetable came into effect. On 1 September 1939, Śmiały participated in the Battle of Mokra, which took place on and around the trunk-line. The September Campaign resulted in the destruction of key railway hubs. With the Wehrmacht's advance, German forces seized all railway facilities and rolling stock, rebuilding the line and dividing it administratively into three sections: Reichsbahndirektion Danzig (north of Nowa Wieś Wielka), Reichsbahndirektion Posen (from Nowa Wieś Wielka to Działoszyn), and Reichsbahndirektion Oppeln (south of Działoszyn). Due to its strategic importance, Chorzów Batory–Tczew railway was targeted by Luftwaffe bombings during the September Campaign.

Despite its north-south orientation, the line became crucial to the Reich's economy, enabling coal transport to the ports in Gdańsk and Gdynia (and further to Sweden) and iron ore shipments in the opposite direction. For this reason, on 19 December 1940, a decision was made to modernize the line by adding missing second tracks, increasing capacity to 60 train pairs per day. The first modernization works began on 1 June 1941. Additional upgrades included constructing the Inowrocław bypass, adding missing connections, building classification humps in Inowrocław, Karsznice, and Maksymilianowo, and constructing a third track on the Tarnowskie Góry–Kalety section. The Zduńska Wola Karsznice junction became especially important to the occupiers as it served as a crossing point for both longitudinal and latitudinal railway routes. The German railways assigned their most powerful and modern steam locomotives, including captured French engines, to this line.

In January 1945, the railway line was reclaimed by the Polish administration.

=== Postwar reconstruction ===
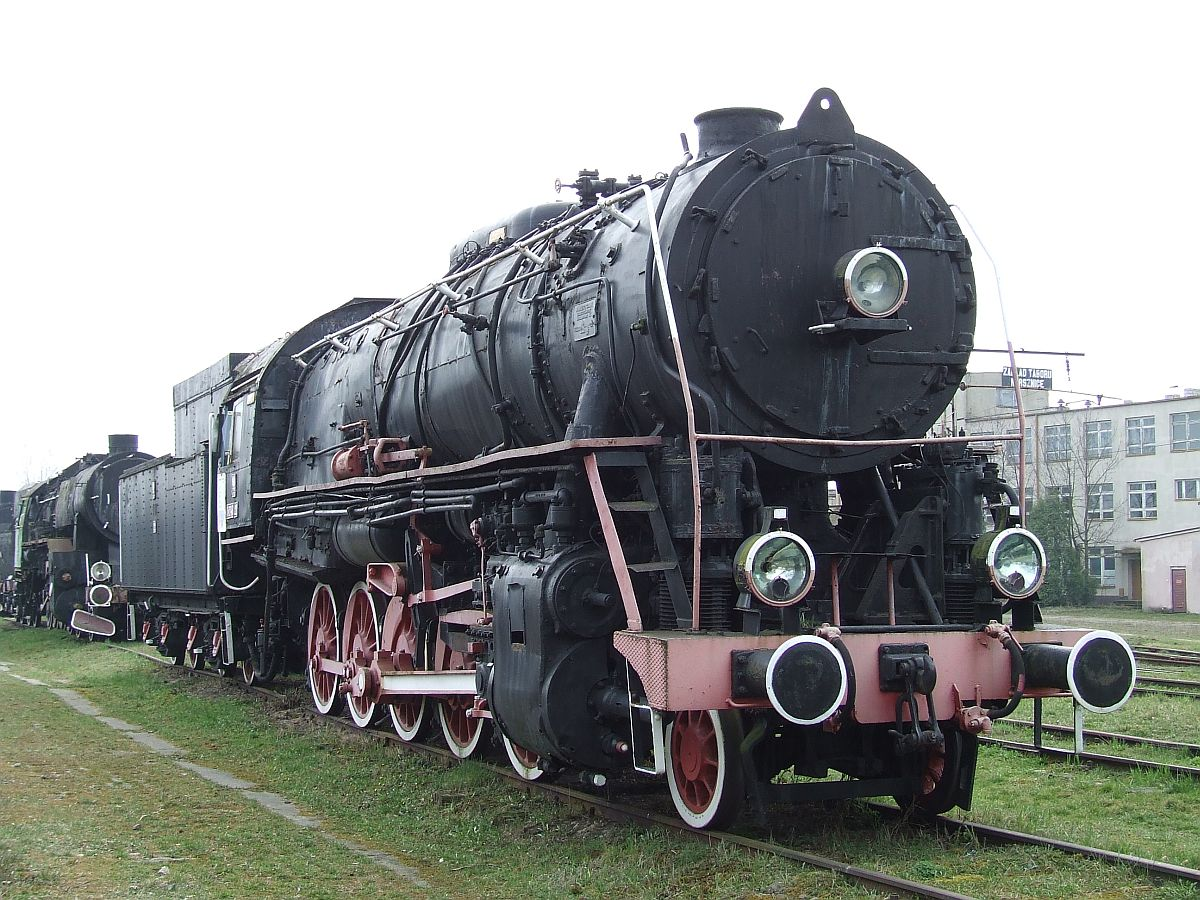
Ty246 locomotive, which hauled heavy freight trains before electrification

Immediately after reclaiming the railway, provisional reconstruction began, which was completed in November 1947. The Central Reconstruction Plan was announced on 2 July 1947, aiming to rebuild and demilitarize the railway network by 1 July 1949. However, a significant issue arose with the concession agreement granting the French–Polish Rail Association control over the line until 1975. The communist authorities, seeking to demonstrate legal continuity of the state, were forced to respect these agreements. At the same time, they were reluctant to allow a private, Western entity to control such a crucial railway line.

Polish State Railways authorities took measures to discourage French claims while looking for a way to terminate the agreement without violating its terms. Eventually, the contract was successfully annulled on 10 May 1947. On 1 July 1949, the militarization of the railway was lifted, restoring normal operations as much as possible. Around the same time, full traffic capacity on the line was reinstated.

=== Electrification ===
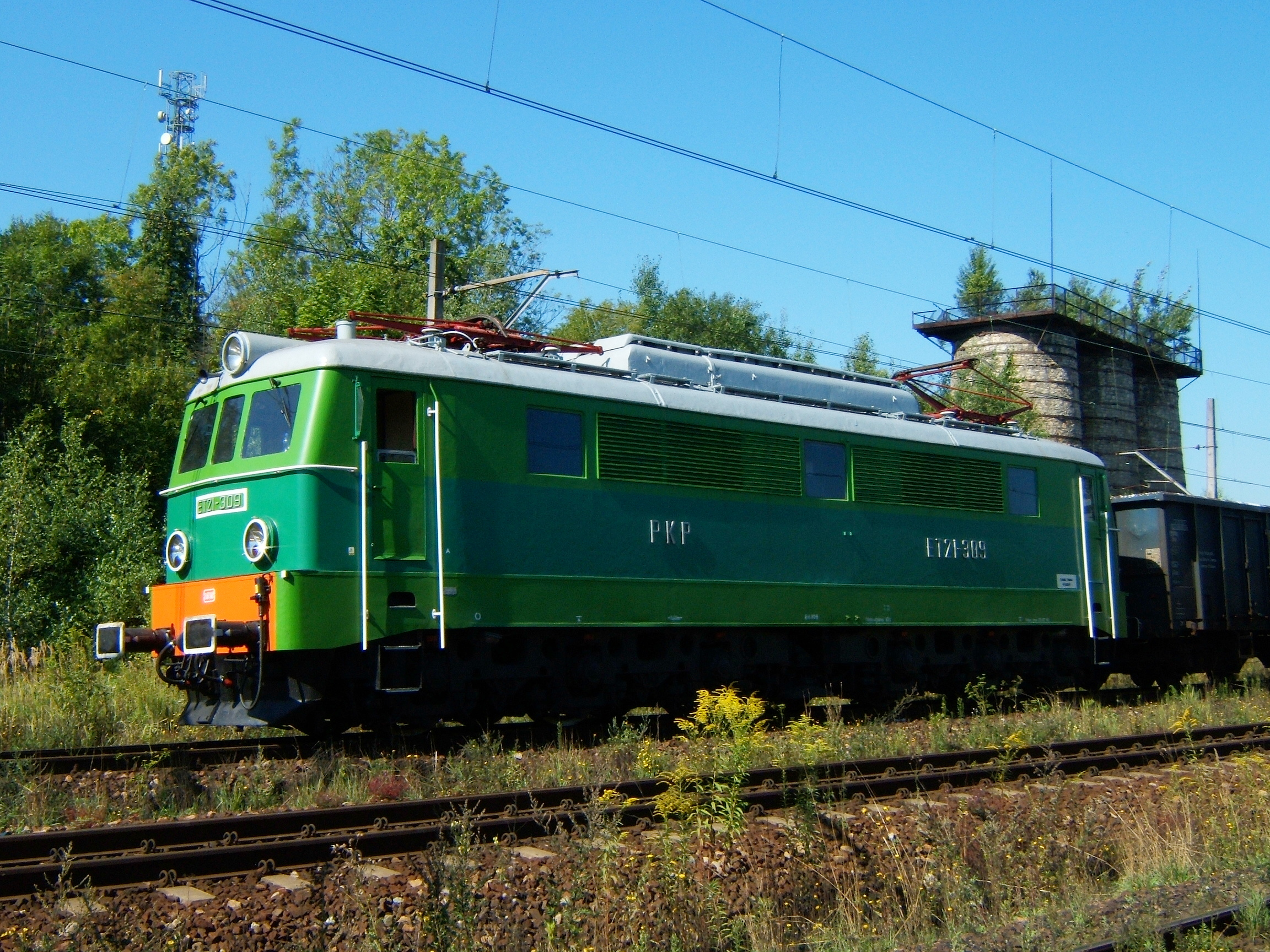
ET21 (the first type of electric locomotives widely used on the Chorzów Batory–Tczew railway) near Nakło Śląskie

The first plans for the electrification of the Chorzów Batory–Tczew railway emerged in 1948. However, postwar economic difficulties and a lack of necessary technology hindered progress. Initially, the decision was made to electrify only suburban traffic in the Warsaw and Gdańsk metropolitan areas. The proposal to electrify this mainline was advantageous, as it primarily served continuous shuttle train services from coal mines to ports. However, electrifying the railway connecting Silesia with Warsaw was deemed more beneficial due to its importance for passenger transport. Both projects were presented to the Ministry of Transport in 1948, and ultimately, the Silesia-Warsaw route was prioritized.

During the 1950s, the line became a site of intense labor competition under the socialist "work rivalry" system. Thanks to well-planned maintenance schedules and a "transport guarantee list", performance significantly exceeded set norms, and travel times were reduced. The locomotive depot in Karsznice particularly distinguished itself in these efforts.

Another attempt to push for electrification occurred in April 1959 when Polish State Railways sought approval from the Ministry of Transport for a trial electrification using 25 kV 50 Hz alternating current. The proposal was rejected due to concerns over a lack of standardized electric rolling stock and a decline in freight traffic on the line. Nonetheless, preparatory work for electrification began in 1957.

Electrification was officially approved by a resolution of the Council of Ministers on 21 February 1963. The first section completed was Tarnowskie Góry–Zduńska Wola Karsznice, which was electrified by 28 November 1965. The second section, from Zduńska Wola to Maksymilianowo, was divided into phases:

- Zduńska Wola Karsznice–Lipie Góry (completed 30 May 1966)
- Lipie Góry–Inowrocław (completed 30 December 1966)
- Inowrocław–Maksymilianowo, including the electrification of the Bydgoszcz railway junction (completed 9 September 1967)
- Maksymilianowo–Tczew (and further to Gdynia via Line 9, completed 23 December 1968)

Electrification allowed Chorzów Batory–Tczew railway to handle 70% of the freight traffic within the Gdańsk Railway Directorate. The reduction in transport costs resulted in a return on investment within five years. The introduction of electric traction also led to changes in locomotive workshops and the establishment of an electric locomotive inspection point in Karsznice.

During the 1960s, Inowrocław railway station underwent a major reconstruction.

Due to the nature of traffic on the line (heavy freight trains), Automatic Train Braking safety systems were installed first. However, delays in the delivery of sufficiently powerful electric locomotives meant that steam locomotives, and later diesel locomotives, remained in service.

On 21 February 1962, between Lipie Góry and Babiak railway stations, a catastrophic boiler explosion occurred in a freight train hauled by Ty246-17. The accident resulted in the deaths of the locomotive crew and caused derailment damage to both the freight train and a passing passenger train.

Electrification of the entire mainline was completed on 23 May 1974, when the final section between Chorzów Batory and Tarnowskie Góry was electrified.

=== 1974–1999 ===
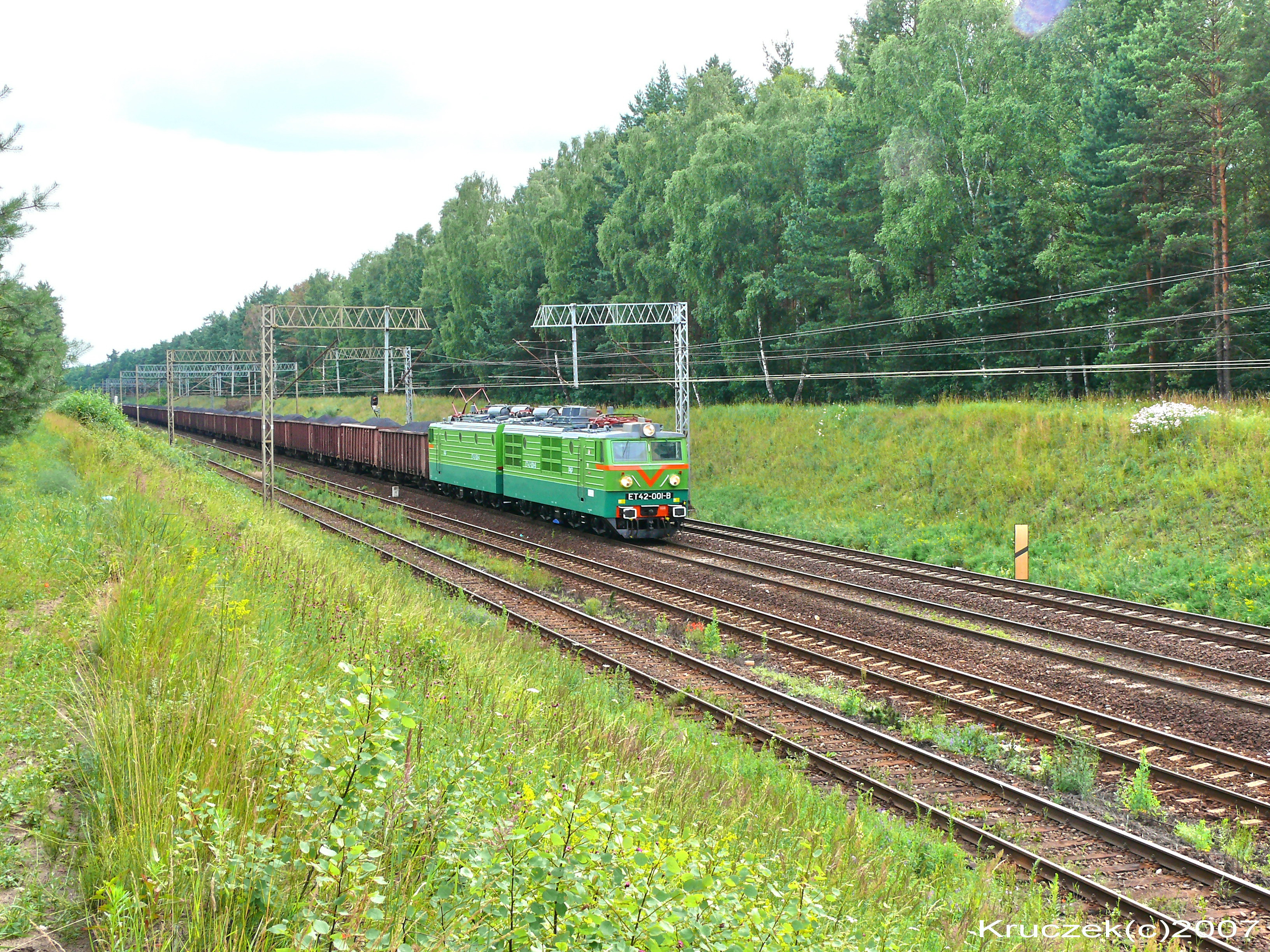
Typical freight train from the late 1970s and early 1980s, hauled by an ET42 locomotive near Rynków

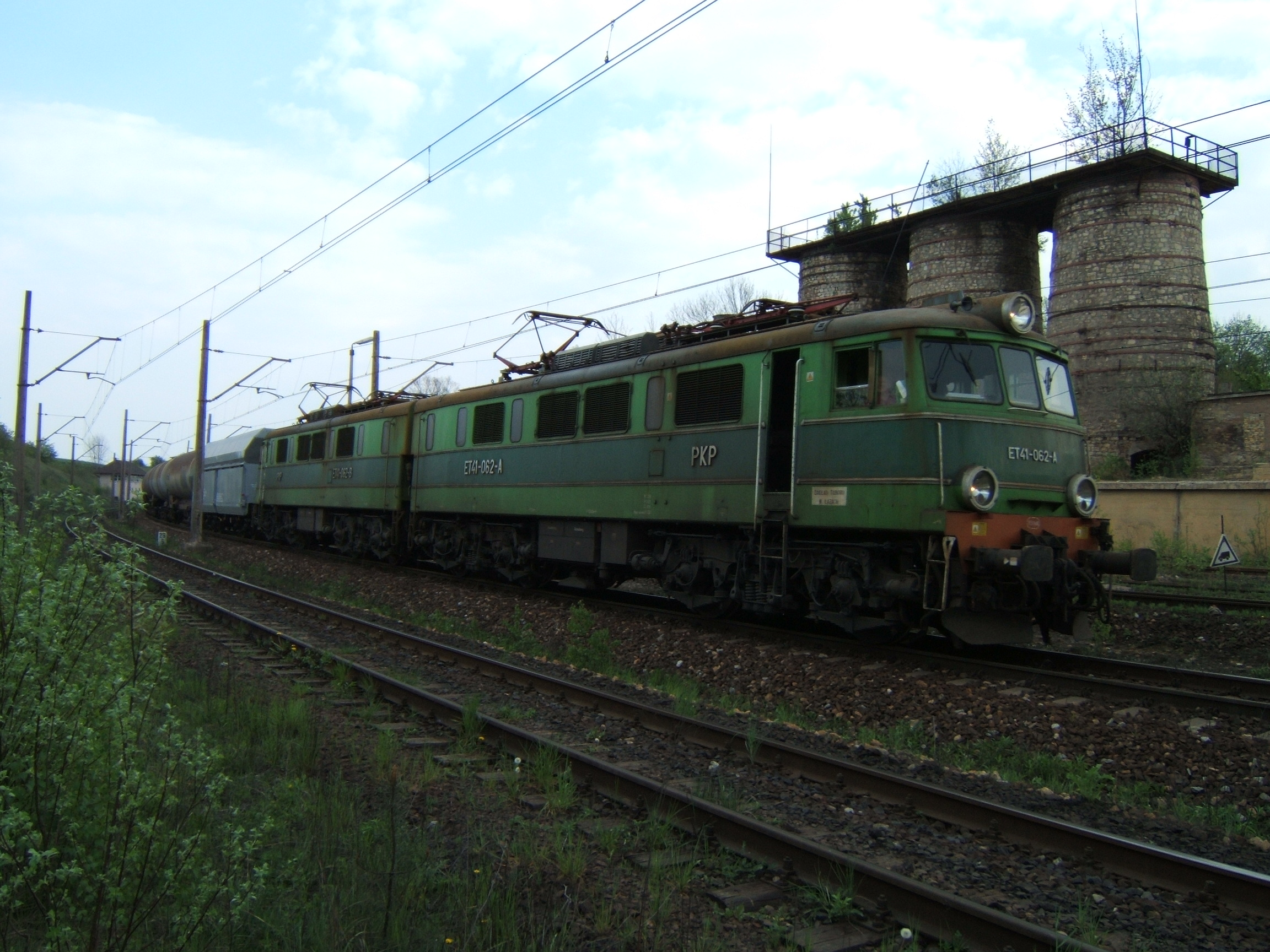
Freight train hauled by an ET41 locomotive near Nakło Śląskie

The steadily increasing freight traffic in the early 1970s caused significant congestion on the line. To alleviate these bottlenecks, authorities considered two options: building an alternative line that could also serve neighboring regions or constructing a four-track railway. Due to the built-up nature of the area along the existing line, the first option was chosen. The plan envisioned a new railway connecting Upper Silesia with the ports via Warsaw, which could also support traffic towards the Soviet Union and serve the Płock refinery. This option was also advantageous for express train connections between the Warsaw, Silesian, and Kraków metropolitan areas.

The congestion problem was partially addressed by introducing new six-axle coal wagons and twin-section locomotives. Initially, in the spring of 1976, ET40 electric locomotives were introduced, followed by ET41s in October 1977 and ET42s in April 1978. All Polish ET42 units were initially assigned to the Karsznice locomotive depot, though some were later relocated to the newly opened depot in Idzikowice. During this period, a Polish record for the heaviest train was set on the Tarnowskie Góry–Tricity route (likely to the Northern Port in Gdańsk), with a gross weight of 4,180 tons (net 3,040 tons).

The introduction of modern electric and diesel locomotives led to the near-total withdrawal of steam locomotives from the Northern and Silesian Railway Directorates by the late 1970s. By the end of 1978, steam traction in the Northern Railway Directorate had almost ceased entirely. However, the severe winter of 1979 necessitated the temporary reintroduction of steam locomotives. The fastest withdrawals occurred in locomotive depots serving the mainline. On 19 February 1979, a tragic accident occurred during snow removal. A Soviet-built snowplow without screw couplings or buffers was being pushed by an ST44 locomotive. As the train attempted to break through a snowdrift, the locomotive's cab was crushed, killing both engineers, Jan Mokwa and Jan Falkowski.

In June 1979, modernization of Chorzów Batory–Tczew railway began, primarily due to the introduction of heavy twin-section locomotives. The first step was upgrading the overhead traction system. Between 1982 and 1983, the tracks were also modernized, replacing standard S49 rails with heavier S60 rails.

In 1981, due to a decline in freight traffic on the coal route, some long-distance passenger trains were redirected to the line, including services such as Zakopane–Gdynia and Gliwice–Gdynia.

Preparations for the modernization of Tarnowskie Góry railway station began in 1984, leading to significant changes along the line. The work, carried out between 1985 and 1987, increased the efficiency of the Tarnowskie Góry railway hub. In 1989, Kalety railway station was modernized, while an upgrade of Inowrocław railway station, started in 1990, was later abandoned.

In 1989, the idea of establishing an institution dedicated to preserving retired rolling stock and railway infrastructure elements emerged. Employees of the Rolling Stock Department in Zduńska Wola-Karsznice took the initiative to create a memorial room in a former oil and lamp storage building.

The 1990s saw a decline in rail freight traffic, leading to the withdrawal of ET21 locomotives from the line, with some units scrapped. In 1999, ET41 locomotives were also withdrawn from service on this route and reassigned to mountain lines.

=== 21st century ===
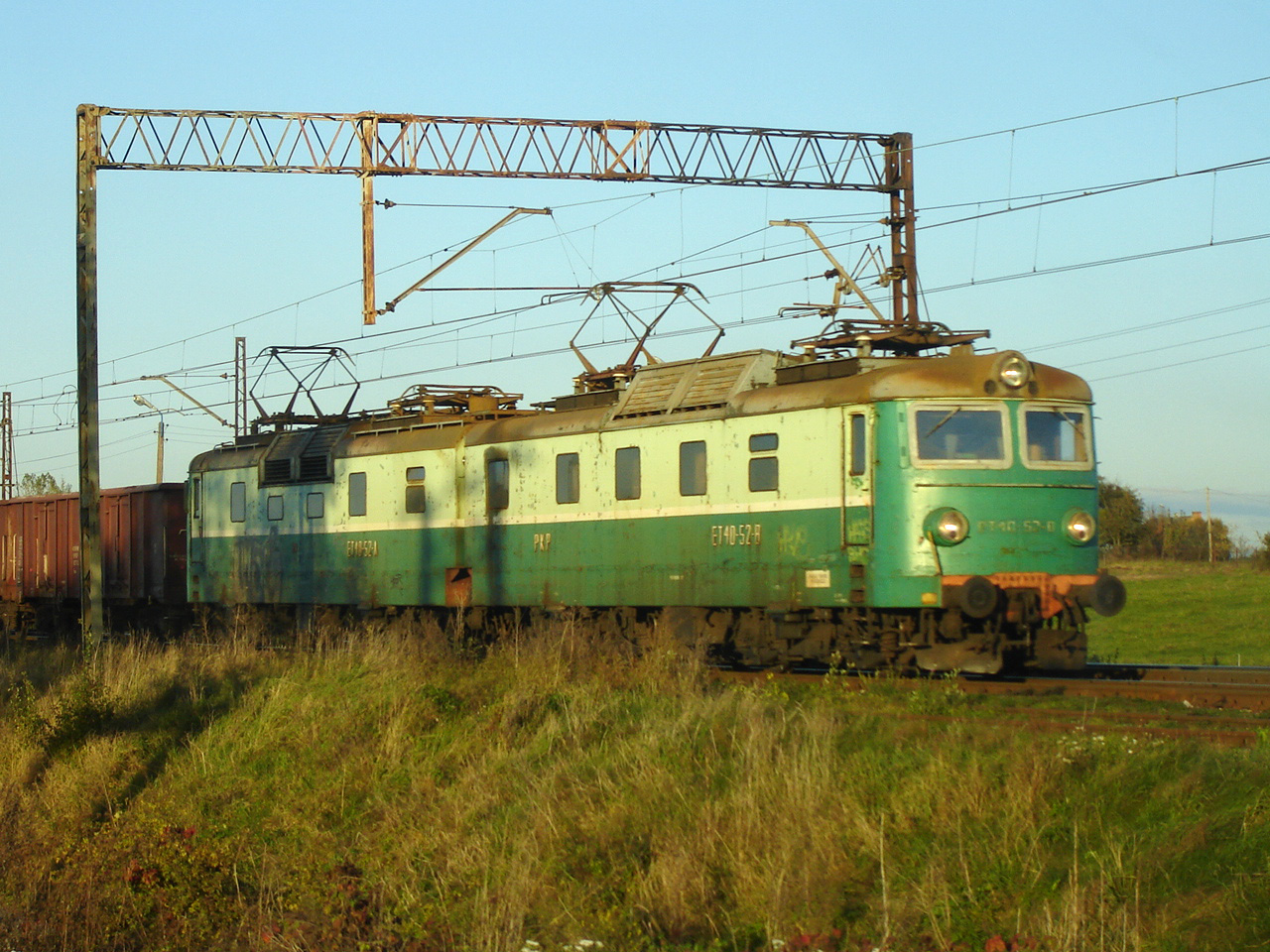
ET40 near Warlubie

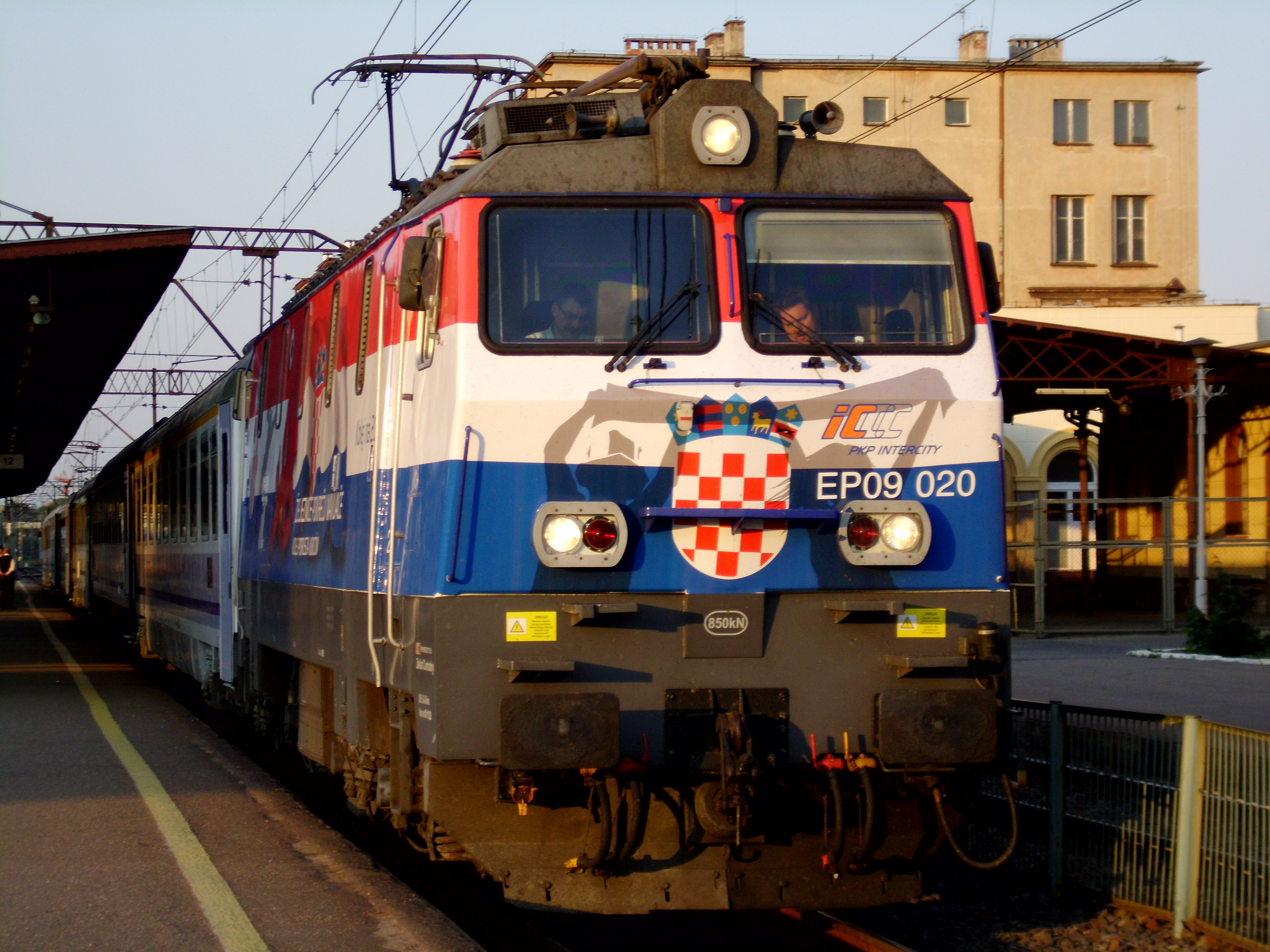
EP09 with the TLK Neptun train at Bydgoszcz Główna railway station

In 2001, due to a lack of funds, the museum in Zduńska Wola-Karsznice was put into liquidation.

In the 21st century, the mass withdrawal of passenger services from the line began. On 9 December 2006, passenger traffic between Herby Nowe and Zduńska Wola was suspended.

In December 2006, Lotos Kolej established a rolling stock inspection point in Karsznice, located in the closed railway station. On 18 December, the Karsznice depot was municipalized and taken over by the city of Zduńska Wola. The Tabor Karsznice company began operations there, carrying out maintenance inspections primarily for operators not connected to the PKP Group.

In December 2008, direct regional trains on the Katowice–Inowrocław route were discontinued and split into several shorter services. Passenger traffic between Babiak and Ponętów Górny Pierwszy was entirely suspended.

In early February, the Łódź Marshal's Office decided to restore passenger services between Herby Nowe and Zduńska Wola. On 12 December 2009, train services on the Chorzew Siemkowice–Herby Nowe section were suspended again.

In spring 2009, due to a significant drop in traffic, ET42 locomotives were withdrawn. In 2011, the locomotives returned to service but were reassigned to other routes.

On 27 April 2010, trains weighing up to 4,000 tons gross returned to the line, operated by an ET41 locomotive.

On 18 May 2010, a flood damaged track 2 between Chorzów Miasto and Chorzów Stary.

In June 2011, due to renovations on Line 9, the organization of traffic between Bydgoszcz and the Tricity was altered. Long-distance trains from Warsaw to Gdynia were rerouted via Chorzów Batory–Tczew railway, which also led to the rerouting of freight trains to Gdynia via Line 201.

On 6 June 2012, an EuroCity Berlin–Gdynia Ekspres train began operating between Inowrocław and Tczew on Chorzów Batory–Tczew railway.

In the third quarter of 2012, some ET40 locomotives were scrapped after their long period of service on Chorzów Batory–Tczew railway, primarily hauling heavy freight trains.

On 9 December 2012, the section between Chorzów Batory and Herby Nowe was taken over by Silesian Railways from Przewozy Regionalne. On the same day, Silesian Railways reactivated the Herby Nowe–Kłobuck section and suspended services between Chorzew Siemkowice and Zduńska Wola (Częstochowa–Zduńska Wola trains).

In early 2013, due to higher demand for heavy locomotives on Chorzów Batory–Tczew railway, ET42 locomotives were returned to service.

On 1 June 2013, passenger services were suspended on the Herby Nowe–Kłobuck section.

In 2013, the section between Bytom Północny and Tarnowskie Góry, as well as the Kalety–Strzebiń section, underwent renovations. In 2014, the Tarnowskie Góry–Miasteczko Śląskie section was renovated.

In December 2020, PKP Polskie Linie Kolejowe signed an agreement to prepare documentation and reconstruct Chorzów Batory–Tczew railway between Chorzów Batory and Nakło Śląskie. In March 2022, construction work began, resulting in the closure of the line between Chorzów Batory and Tarnowskie Góry. On 15 December 2024, passenger traffic was restored, and a new stop, Chorzów Uniwersytet, was opened. On the same day, regional traffic was resumed between Chorzew Siemkowice and Zduńska Wola Karsznice with new connections from Częstochowa to Łódź Fabryczna via Zduńska Wola.

== Technical parameters ==
Maximum train speeds as of 9 January 2019:

Speed			Kilometer		Speed		
track 1			from	to	track 2		
passenger	railbuses	freight	from	to	passenger	railbuses	freight
50			5.521	5.524			
50			5.524	8.122	50		
40			8.122	8.745	50		
40			8.745	12.000	60		
40			12.000	13.100	30		
100			13.100	16.700	100		
50			16.700	22.710	50		
110			22.710	26.871	120		
100			26.871	33.490	120		
100			33.490	41.240	100		
120			41.240	41.257	100		
120			41.257	47.254	120		
120			47.254	47.380	120		
100			47.380	55.024	120		
100			55.024	78.900	100		
100			78.900	125.165	80		
100			125.165	136.791	120		
70			136.791	146.791	120		
120			146.791	146.793	120		
120			146.793	150.122	120		
120			150.122	156.863	120		
120			156.863	156.952	120		
120			156.952	165.000	120		
120		100	165.000	166.667	100		70
80			166.667	169.880	70		70
100			169.880	202.100	70		70
100			202.100	203.800	110		100
100			203.800	213.600	120		100
100			213.600	229.195	100		
100			229.195	240.026	120		
100			240.026	244.000	100		
120		100	244.000	250.918	100		
120		100	250.918	252.255	120		100
120		100	252.255	282.912	120		100
120		100	282.912	284.345	120		100
120		100	284.345	294.180	120		100
120		100	294.180	316.980	100		80
100			316.980	317.053	100		80
100			317.053	325.231	90		70
120		100	325.231	326.430	90		70
140		100	326.430	330.500	140		100
120		100	330.500	332.200	120		100
140		100	332.200	337.000	140		100
120		100	337.400	339.100	120		100
140		100	339.100	344.600	140		100
120		100	344.600	347.028	120		100
160		100	347.028	353.519	160		100
120		100	353.519	354.990	120		100
160		100	354.990	361.200	160		100
140		100	361.200	362.200	140		100
120		100	362.200	367.500	120		100
90		40	367.500	368.400	90		40
70		40	368.400	369.300	70		40
50		40	369.300	370.100	50		40
50		40	370.100	371.000	90		40
120		100	371.000	371.100	90		40
160		100	371.100	372.480	160		100
160		100	372.480	378.000	160		100
120		70	378.000	378.600	120		100
120		100	378.600	380.500	120		100
140		100	380.500	388.500	140		100
120		100	388.500	390.200	120		100
140		100	390.200	396.800	140		100
120		100	396.800	398.300	120		100
140		100	398.300	402.600	140		100
120		100	402.600	404.000	120		100
140		100	404.000	409.800	140		100
120		100	409.800	411.300	100		
130		100	411.300	411.315	100		
130		100	411.315	412.400	130		80
140		100	412.400	421.400	140		80
120		100	421.400	421.505	120		80
120		100	421.505	422.019	120		
120		100	422.019	423.400	120		100
160		100	423.400	437.900	160		100
120		100	437.900	439.650	120		100
140		100	439.650	449.200	140		100
120		100	449.200	450.700	120		100
140		100	450.700	456.650	140		100
120		100	456.650	458.650	120		100
160		100	458.650	461.200	160		100
150		100	461.200	461.800	150		100
160		100	461.800	466.140	160		100
120		100	466.140	467.640	120		100
160		100	467.640	475.950	160		100
140		100	475.950	477.300	140		100
120		100	477.300	478.960	120		100
160		100	478.960	484.150	160		100
120		100	484.150	485.600	120		100
160		100	485.600	493.880	160		100
120		100	493.880	496.778	120		100
60			496.778	498.687	60		
			498.687	498.912	60		

Kilometer		Class	
from	to	track 1	track 2
5.521	5.524	D3	-
5.524	7.130	D3	D3
7.130	363.600	D3	D3
363.600	368.600	D3	D3
368.600	498.687	D3	D3
498.687	498.912	-	D3

The overhead catenary system, depending on the section, is adapted for a maximum speed ranging from 110 to 160 km/h. The current-carrying capacity varies between 1,725 and 2,540 A, and the minimum distance between current collectors is 20 m.

The line is equipped with a bidirectional automatic block signaling system between Tczew and Maksymilianowo railway stations, between Inowrocław and Chorzew Siemkowice railway stations, and near Tarnowskie Góry railway station. A unidirectional automatic block signaling system is installed between Nowa Wieś Wielka and Jaksice railway stations. The remaining sections are equipped with a semi-automatic block system.

== Infrastructure ==
=== Connections with other railways ===
Station	Railway number	Direction	Status	Source
Chorzów Batory	137	Katowice	Active	
Chorzów Batory	137	Legnica	Active	
Chorzów Stary	145	Radzionków	Inactive	
Chorzów Stary	161	Katowice Szopienice Północne	Active	
Bytom	132	Wrocław Główny	Active	
Bytom Karb	165	Bytom Bobrek	Active	
Radzionków	145	Chorzów Stary	Active	
Tarnowskie Góry	144	Opole Główne	Active	
Tarnowskie Góry	182	Zawiercie	Active	
Kalety	143	Wrocław Mikołajów	Active	
Kalina	61	Kielce Główne	Active	
Herby Nowe	61	Kielce Główne	Active	
Herby Nowe	61	Fosowskie	Active	
Herby Nowe	181	Oleśnica	Active	
Chorzew Siemkowice	146	Częstochowa Wyczerpy	Active	
Zduńska Wola Karsznice	14	Łódź Kaliska	Active	
Zduńska Wola Karsznice	14	Tuplice	Active	
Dionizów	14	Łódź Kaliska	Active	
Dionizów	14	Tuplice	Active	
Ponętów	3	Warszawa Zachodnia	Active	
Ponętów	3	Kunowice	Active	
Borysławice	3	Warszawa Zachodnia	Active	
Borysławice	3	Kunowice	Active	
Inowrocław Rąbinek	206	Drawski Młyn	Active	
Mimowola	741	Jaksice	Active	
Inowrocław	353	Poznań Wschód	Active	
Inowrocław	353	Skandawa	Active	
Nowa Wieś Wielka	201	Gdynia Port	Active	
Bydgoszcz Główna	18	Kutno	Active	
Bydgoszcz Główna	18	Piła Główna	Active	
Bydgoszcz Główna	356	Poznań Wschód	Active	
Maksymilianowo	201	Nowa Wieś Wielka	Active	
Maksymilianowo	201	Gdynia Port	Active	
Terespol Pomorski	240	Świecie nad Wisłą	Active	
Terespol Pomorski	240	Złotów	Inactive	
Laskowice Pomorskie	208	Działdowo	Active	
Laskowice Pomorskie	208	Chojnice	Active	
Laskowice Pomorskie	215	Bąk	Active	
Twarda Góra	242	Nowe	Inactive	
Smętowo	238	Myślice	Inactive	
Smętowo	238	Szlachta	Inactive	
Morzeszczyn	244	Gniew	Inactive	
Tczew	9	Warszawa Wschodnia	Active	
Tczew	9	Gdańsk Główny	Active	
Tczew	203	Kostrzyn	Active	

=== Exploitation points ===
Name of railway station	Photo	Number of platform edges	Infrastructure	Former names
Chorzów Batory		4	Ticket offices; Underground pasage	Bismarckhütte (1846–1915); Bismarckhütte Staatsbahnof (1916–1922); Hajduki (1922–1939); Bismarckhütte (1939–1941); Königshütte-Bismarck (1942–1945); Hajduki (1945–1951)
Chorzów Uniwersytet		2		
Chorzów Miasto		2	Underground pasage	Königshütte (1860–1900); Königshütte (Oberschleisen) (1901–1909); Königshütte (1910–1915); Königshütte (Oberschleisen) Staatsbahnhof (1916–1922); Królewska Huta (1922–1934)
Chorzów Stary		2		Chorzow (1868–1922); Chorzów (1922–1939); Chorzow (1939–1941); Königshütte (Oberschleisen) Ost (1942–1943); Königshütte Ost (1944–1945)
Bytom		6	Underground pasage	Beuthen (1859–1900); Beuthen Oberschlesischer Bahnhof (1901–1909); Beuthen (Oberschlesien) Hauptbahnhof (1910–1931); Beuthen (Oberschlesien) (1931–1939); Beuthen (Oberschlesien) Hauptbahnhof (1939–1945)
Bytom Karb		3		Karf (1859–1945); Karb (1945–1947); Bobrek Karb (1948–1957)
Bytom Północny		2		Beuthen Stadtwald (1859-1909); Beuthen (Oberschlesien) Stadtwald (1910-1920); Beuthen Stadtwald (1921-1944); Beuthen (Oberschlesien) Stadtwald (1944–1945)
Radzionków Rojca		4		Neu Radzionkau (1892-1922); Rojca (1922–1939); Neu Radzionkau (1939–1945); Rojca (1945-1953); Radzionków Miasto (1954-1967); Radzionków Rojca (1968-1978); Bytom Rojca (1979-1998)
Radzionków		5	Overpass	Radzionkau (1869-1922); Radzionków (1922–1939); Radzionkau (1939–1945); Radzionków (1945-1978); Bytom Radzionków (1979-1998)
Nakło Śląskie		2	Overpass	Naclo (1869-1900); Naklo (1901-1922); Nakło Śląskie (1922–1939); Naklo (1939–1945)
Tarnowskie Góry		5	Ticket office; Locomotive depot; Underground pasage	Tarnowitz (1857-1922); Tarnowskie Góry (1922–1939); Tarnowitz (1939–1945)
Miasteczko Śląskie		5		Georgenberg (1884-1922); Miasteczko Śląskie (1922–1939); Georgenberg (1939–1945); Miasteczko Śląskie (1945–1989); Tarnowskie Góry Miasteczko (1990-1995)
Zwierzyniec (block post)		0		
Kalety		3	Silesian Railways agency ticket office; Overpass	Stahlhammer (1884-1922); Kalety (1922–1939); Stahlhammer (1939–1945)
Strzebiń		3	Overpass	Strzebiń (1932-1939); Strzebin (1939–1945)
Boronów		3		Boronów (1926-1939); Boronow (1939–1945)
Kalina (junction)		0		
Herby Nowe		5	Overpass	Herby Nowe (1926-1939); Neu Herby(1939–1945)
Wręczyca		2		Wręczyca (1930–1939); Wreczyca (1939-1943); Wrenczyca (1944–1945)
Kłobuck		2		Kłobuck (1930–1939); Klobuck (1939–1945); Kłobuck (1945-1950); Kłobuck Częstochowski (1951-1974)
Mokra Częstochowska		2		
Izbiska (block post)		0		
Miedźno		2		Miedzno (1930-1934); Miedźno (1935-1937); Miedzno (1938-1957)
Annolesie		2		
Więcki (block post)		0		
Działoszyn		4		Działoszyn (1930–1939); Dzialoszyn (1939-1942); Dilltal (1943-1945)
Sadowiec (block post)		0		
Chorzew Siemkowice		5		Siemkowice (1930-1942); Saatgrund (1943-1945); Siemkowice (1945-1967)
Huta		2		Kołczygłów (1953-1971)
Rusiec Łódzki		3		Rusiec (1930-1932); Rusiec Łódzki (1933-1939); Rusiec (1939–1940); Rusiec Lodzki (1941–1942); Rustitz (1943-1945)
Chociw Łaski		5		Widawa (1930-1942); Wiedenbruch (Warthel) (1943-1945); Widawa (1945-1967)
Siedlce Łaskie		2		Sielce (1950-1967)
Kozuby		3		Kozuby (1930–1939); Kozyby (1939–1941); Kospendorf (1942-1945)
Kustrzyce		2		
Zduńska Wola Południowa		2	Locomotive depot	Karsznice Towarowe (1950-1957); Karsznice Południowe (1958-1974)
Zduńska Wola Karsznice		5		Karsznice (1930-1942); Karschnitz (1943); Karschnitz (Warthel) (1944–1945); Karsznice (1945-1950); Karsznice Osobowe (1951-1957); Karsznice (1958-1974)
Dionizów (junction)		0		
Szadek		3		Szadek (1932-1942); Schadeck (Warthel) (1943-1945)
Otok		3		Otok (1931-1941); Heimwald (1942-1945)
Poddębice		3		
Kłudna		3		Kłudna (1931-1939); Kludna (1939-1942); Kluden (1943-1945)
Kraski		3		Kraski (1932-1942); Buntfeld (1943-1945)
Dąbie nad Nerem		3		Dąbie nad Nerem (1932-1936); Dąbie (1937-1939); Dabie (1939-1942); Eichstätt (Warthel) (1943-1945)
Ponętów		3		Ponętów (1932-1939); Ponentów (1939-1942); Lockheim (1943-1945)
Lipie Góry		3		Lipie Góry (1932-1939); Lipie Gory (1939-1942); Liebguhren (1943-1945)
Babiak		3		Babiak (1932-1942); Babenwald (1943-1945)
Zaryń		3		Zaryń (1932-1939); Zaryn (1939-1942); Sarin (1943-1945)
Piotrków Kujawski		3		Piotrków Kujawski (1932-1939); Petrikau (Posen) (1939–1940); Petrikau (Warthel) (1941–1945)
Chełmce		3		Chełmce (1932-1939); Chelmce (1939-1942); Grünholm (1943-1945)
Bachorce		2		
Karczyn		3		Karczyn (1932-1939); Kartschin (1939-1942); Talrode (1943-1945)
Inowrocław Rąbinek		4	Inactive locomotive depot	Klausaschacht (1882-1900); Rąbinek (1932-1939); Rabinek (1939-1942); Romburg (1943-1945); Rąbinek (1945-1957)
Mimowola (junction)		0		
Inowrocław		6	Ticket office; Inactive locomotive depot; Underground pasage	Hohensalza (1872-1919); Inowrocław (1919-1939); Hohensalza (1939–1945)
Jaksice		3		Jakschitz (1885-1915); Jakschütz (1916-1920); Jaksice (1920-1939); Jakschütz (1939–1941); Axelhausen (1942-1945)
Złotniki Kujawskie		3		Güldenhof (1878-1919); Złotniki Kujawskie (1919-1939); Güldenhof (1939–1945)
Nowa Wieś Wielka		6		Gross Neudorf (1872-1920); Nowawieś Wielka (1920-1938); Nowa Wieś Wielka (1939); Gross Neudorf (1939-1943); Gross Neudorf (Westpreussen) (1944); Grossneudorf (Westpreussen) (1944–1945); Nowa Wieś Wielka (1948-1967); Nowa Wieś Wielka (1968-1974)
Chmielniki Bydgoskie		2		Chmielniki (1926-1939); Hopfengarten See (1939–1945); Chmielniki (1945-1951)
Brzoza Bydgoska		2		Hopfengarten (1890-1920); Brzoza (1930–1939); Hopfengarten (1939–1945); Broza (1945-1951)
Trzciniec		3		Rohrbruch (1886-1920); Trzciniec (1920-1939); Rohrbruch (1939–1945)
Bydgoszcz Główna		10	Ticket offices; Locomotive depot; Underground pasage	Bromberg (1851-1909); Bromberg Staatsbahnhof (1910-1920); Bydgoszcz (1920-1939); Bromberg (1939–1941); Bromberg Hauptbahnhof (1942-1945); Bydgoszcz (1945-1946)
Rynkowo Wiadukt		2		
Rynkowo (railway station and block post)		3		Rynkowo (1918–1939); Rinkau (1939–1945)
Maksymilianowo		5		Maxymilianowo (1880-1907); Maxthal (1907-1909); Maxtal (1910-1922); Maksymilianowo (1920-1939); Maxtal (1939–1945)
Kotomierz		3		Klahrheim (1852-1920); Kotomierz (1920-1939); Klahrheim (1939–1941); Klarheim (1942-1945)
Pruszcz Pomorski		2		Prust (1852-1920); Pruszcz Pomorski (1920-1939); Prust (1939–1945)
Parlin		3		
Terespol Pomorski		5	Inactive locomotive depot; Underground pasage	Terespol (1851-1920); Terespol Pomorski (1920-1939); Terespol (Westpreussen) (1939–1941); Terzewald (1942-1945)
Laskowice Pomorskie		4	Inactive locomotive depot; Underground pasage	Laskowitz (1852-1909); Laskowitz (Westpreussen) (1910-1920); Laskowice (1920-1939); Laskowitz (Westpreussen) (1939-1942); Lasswitz (1943-1945)
Warlubie		3		Warlubin (1852-1866); Warlubien (1867-1920); Warlubie (1920-1939); Warlubien (1939–1941); Warlieb (1942-1945)
Twarda Góra		2	Inactive locomotive depot	Hardenberg (1852-1920); Twarda Góra (1920-1939); Hardenberg (1939–1945)
Smętowo		5	Inactive locomotive depot	Czerwinsk (1862-1890); Schmentau (1890-1920); Smętowo (1920-1939); Schmentau (1939–1945)
Majewo		2		Paulshof (1895-1920); Majewo (1920-1939); Paulshof (1939–1945)
Morzeszczyn		3		Morroschin (1852-1920); Morzeszczyn (1920-1939); Morroschin (1939–1941); Leutmannsdorf (1942-1945)
Kulice Tczewskie		2		Kulice (1924-1939); Kulitz (1939–1945); Kulice (1945-1950)
Pelplin		2		
Subkowy		2		Subkau (1878-1920); Subkowy (1920-1939); Subkau (1939–1945)
Czarlin		2		Narkau (1906-1920); Narkowy (1920-1939); Narkau (1939–1945); Narkowy (1945-1957)
Górki (junction)		0		
Tczew		7	Ticket office; Locomotive depot; Overpass	Dirschau (1852-1920); Tczew (1920-1939); Dirschau (1939–1945)

=== Accompanying infrastructure ===
==== Locomotive depots ====
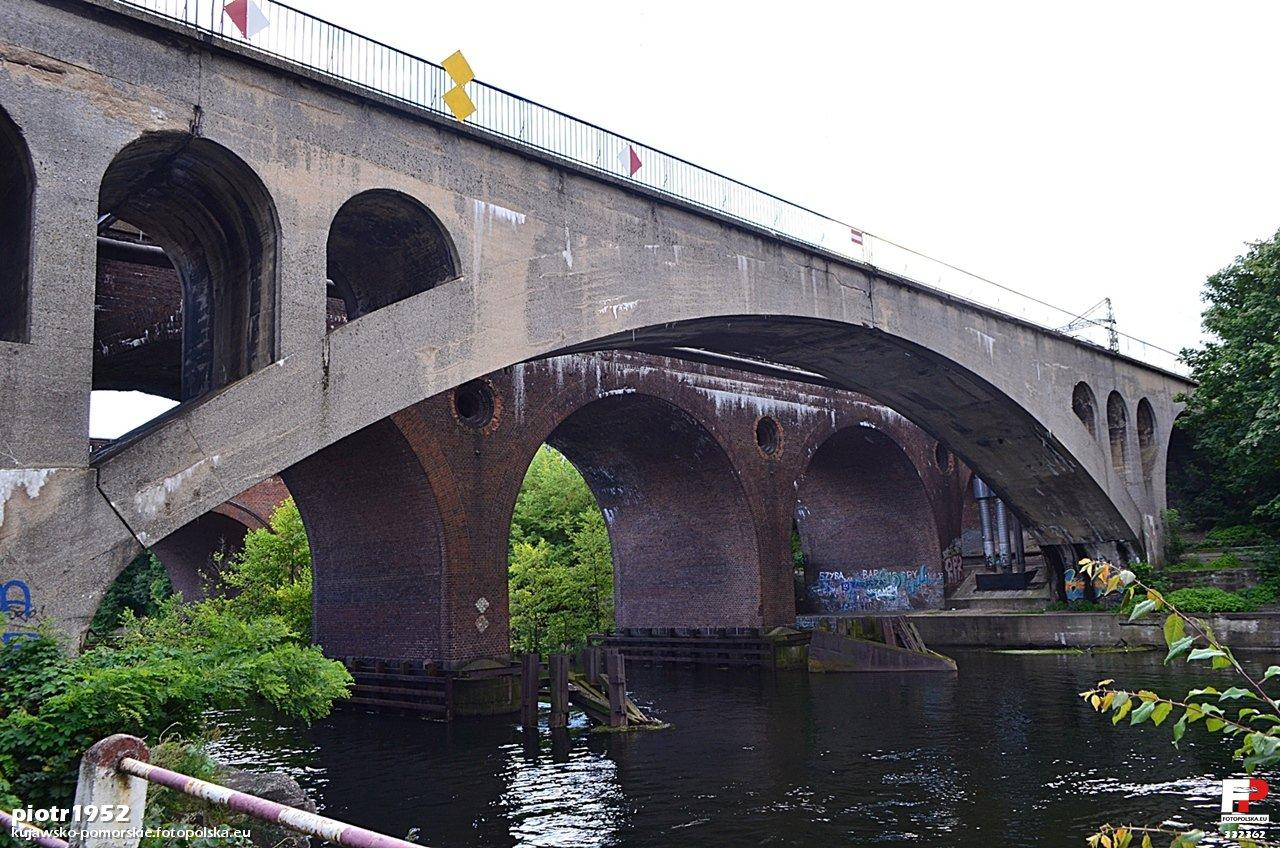
Railway bridges over the Brda river in Bydgoszcz

Locomotive depots are located along the railway in Tarnowskie Góry, Zduńska Wola-Karsznice, Bydgoszcz, and Tczew. The depot in Zduńska Wola was built specifically to service the Polish Coal Trunk-Line, while the others predated it. In the northern section, small locomotive depots operated near local (now defunct) railway hubs.

==== Residential buildings ====
As the line passed far from urban areas, railway housing estates were established near major junctions. The largest of these was Karsznice, which became part of Zduńska Wola in 1973.

==== Museum facilities ====
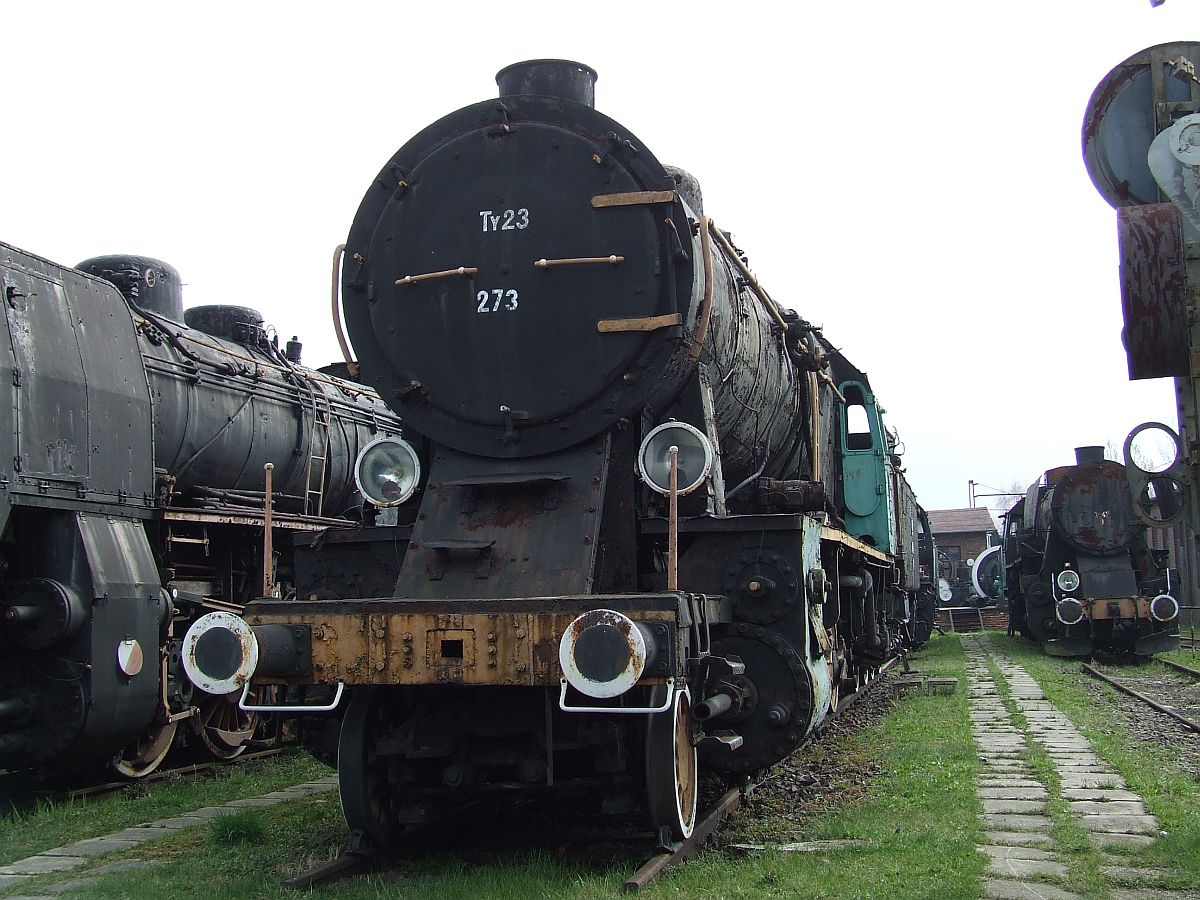
Museum exhibition in Zduńska Wola-Karsznice

Museum-like facilities dedicated to preserving withdrawn rolling stock, railway infrastructure, and other memorabilia related to the Polish Coal Trunk-Line were established in Zduńska Wola-Karsznice and Herby, as well as in Kościerzyna, which lies along line no. 201. These facilities are housed in former railway buildings and are open to visitors.

The origins of the open-air railway museum in Zduńska Wola-Karsznice date back to 1989, when efforts to collect historical artifacts began. The first major exhibit was a Px48 steam locomotive, placed as a monument at the entrance to the locomotive depot. The official opening of the historic rolling stock exhibition took place on 11 November 1993. Since 2010, the site has been managed by the Museum of the History of Zduńska Wola, and since 2015, it has been an official branch of the museum.

== Train traffic ==
=== Regional trains ===
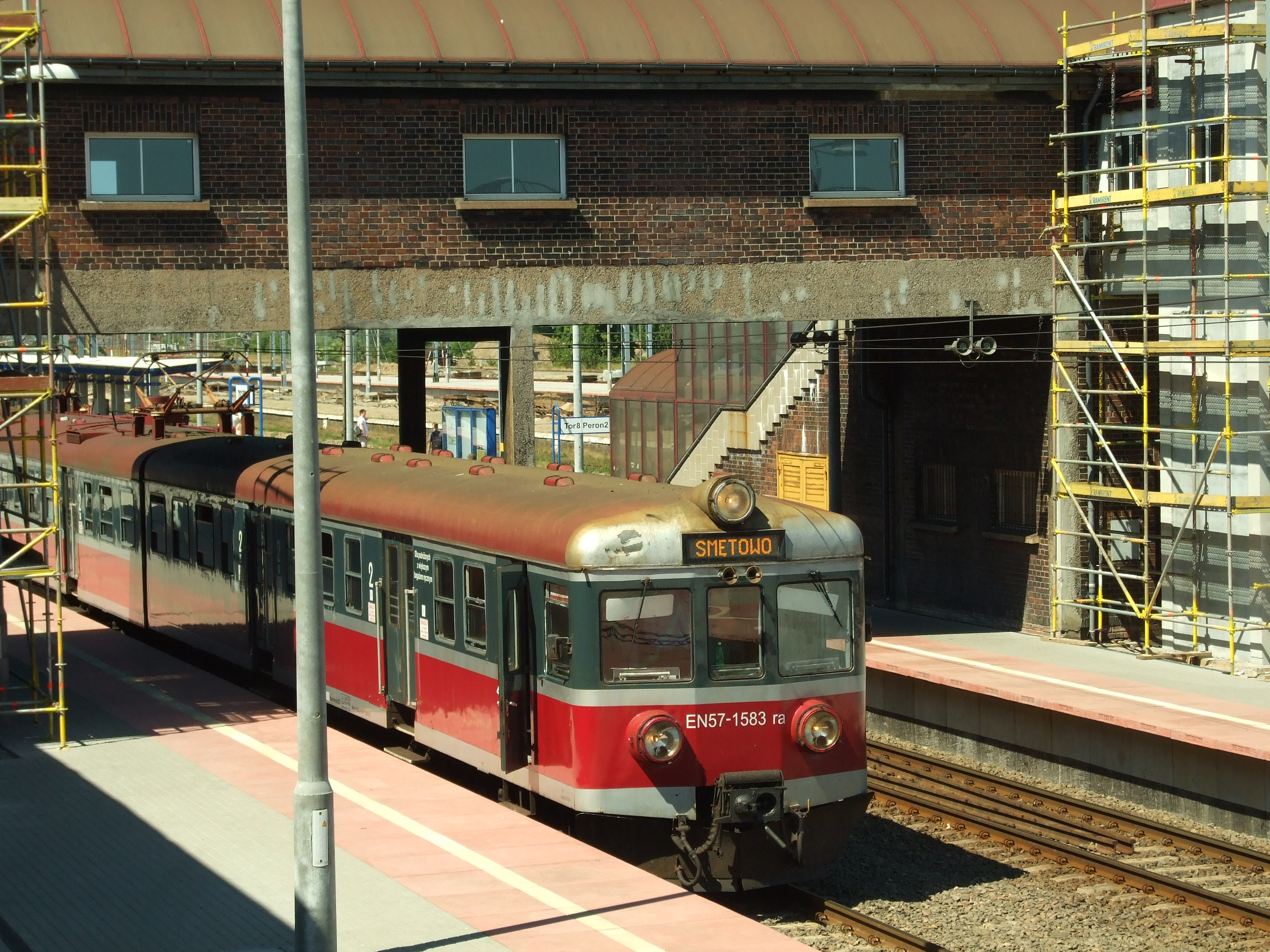
Passenger train from Tczew to Smętowo

In the 2014/2015 timetable, passenger trains operated on the following sections:

- Chorzów Batory–Kalety, served by Silesian Railways (Katowice–Lubliniec trains),
- Inowrocław–Tczew, served by Polregio,
- Tarnowskie Góry–Herby Nowe, served by Polregio,
- Bydgoszcz Główna–Maksymilianowo, served by Arriva (Bydgoszcz–Chojnice trains).

No passenger trains operate on the Inowrocław–Herby Nowe section.

=== Long-distance trains ===
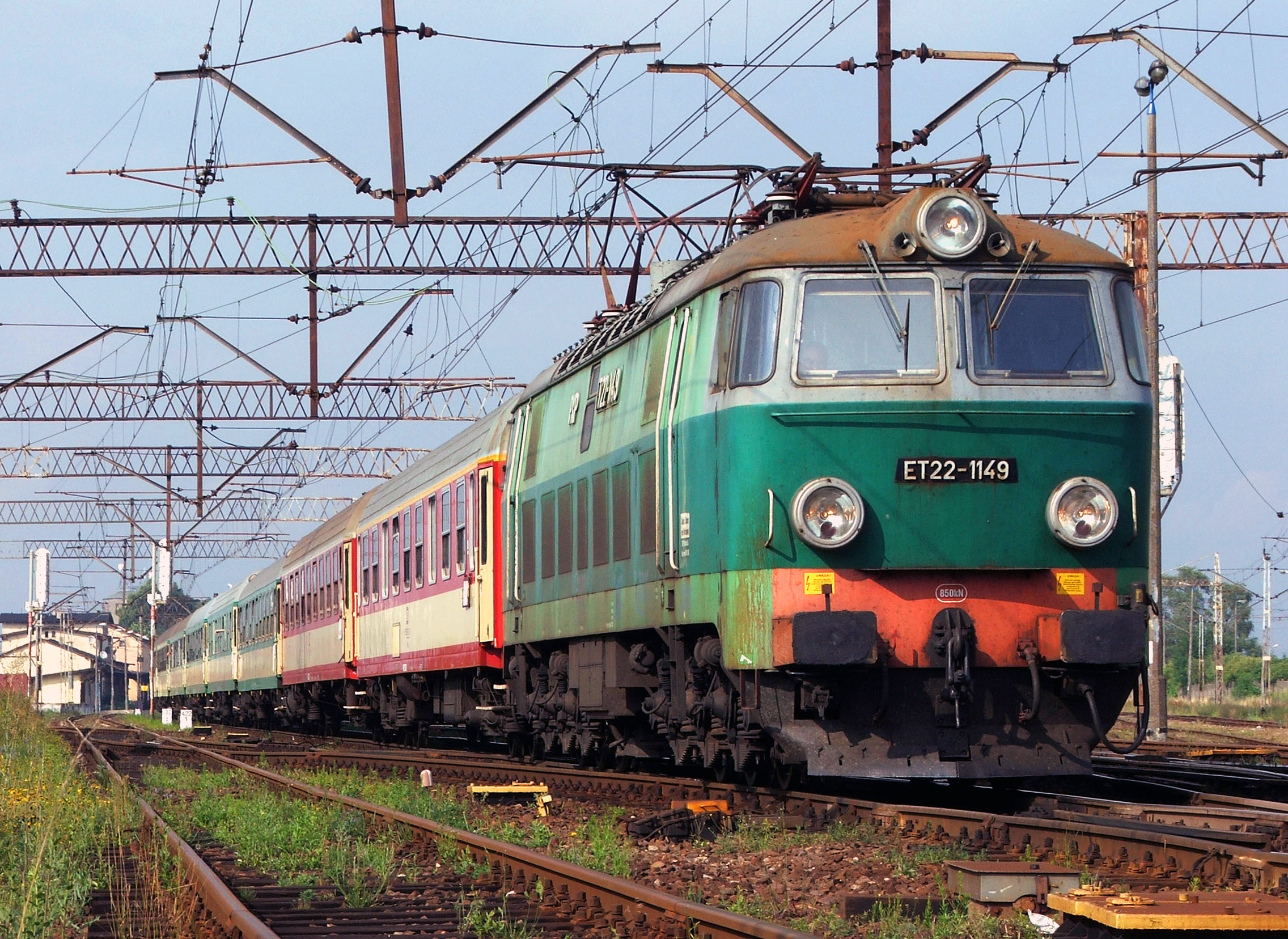
Express train on the Gdynia Główna–Wrocław Główny route in Laskowice Pomorskie

Chorzów Batory–Tczew railway serves long-distance trains from the Tricity to Bydgoszcz and further to Poznań (via Chorzów Batory–Tczew railway to the Inowrocław railway station). On the remaining section of the line, long-distance trains did not operate until 1981. After 1981, selected seasonal trains were rerouted along this line.

In June 2011, thanks to the increase in speed between Bydgoszcz and Laskowice to 120 km/h and due to prolonged repairs on Warsaw–Gdańsk railway, PKP Intercity transferred two pairs of Express InterCity trains Kaszub and Neptun on the Warsaw–Gdynia route, as well as several pairs of TLK trains, which now run on Chorzów Batory–Tczew railway from the Inowrocław Railway Junction to Tczew.

Since 6 June 2012, an EuroCity train on the Berlin–Gdynia route runs on Chorzów Batory–Tczew railway between Inowrocław and Tczew. This train stops (on Chorzów Batory–Tczew railway) in Inowrocław, Bydgoszcz Główna, and Tczew.

=== Freight trains ===
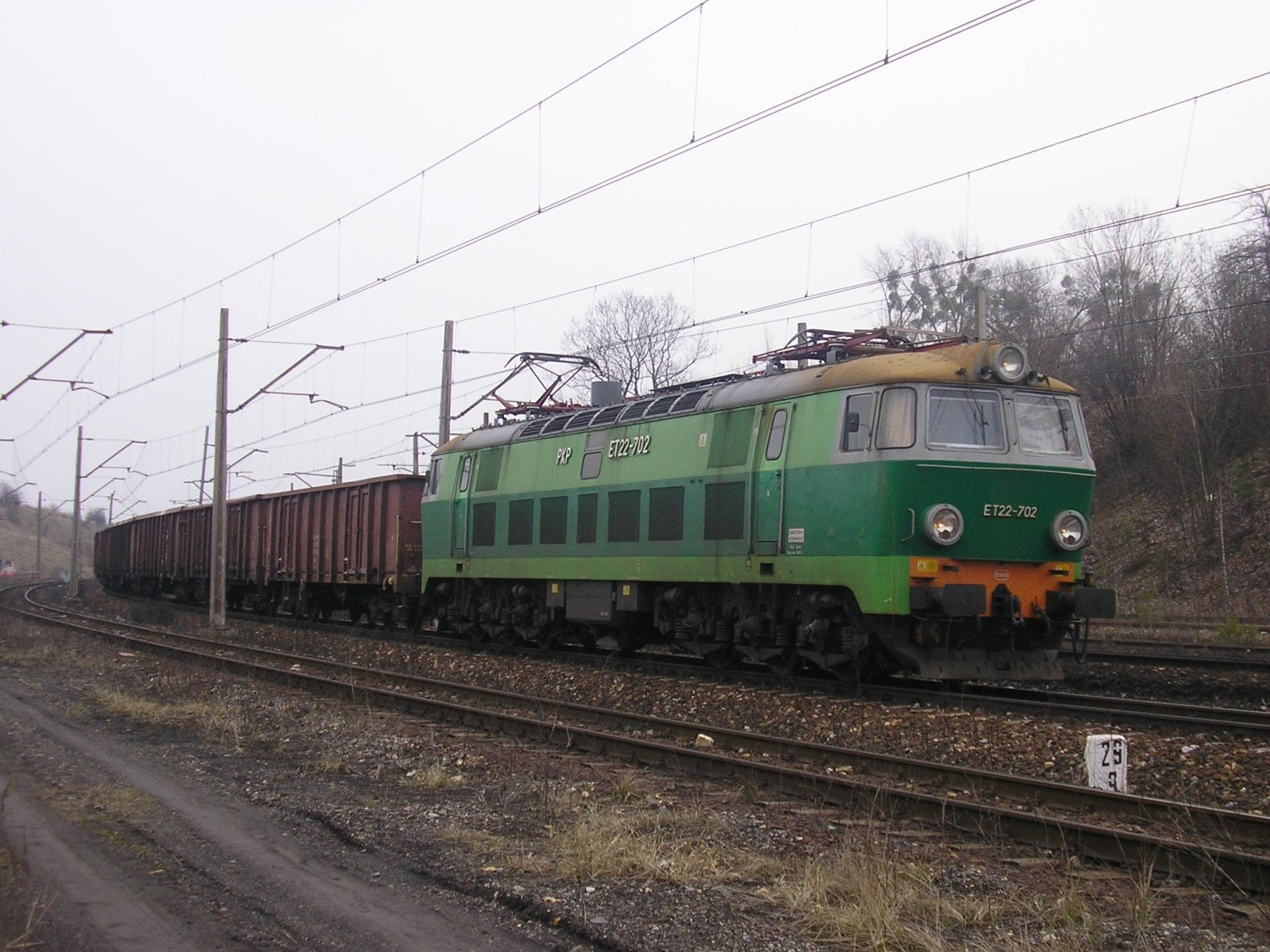
Freight train with the ET22-702 locomotive near Nakło Śląskie

The primary task of Chorzów Batory–Tczew railway is to transport heavy freight trains from Silesia to the Tricity ports. This line, due to bypassing large agglomerations (freight trains bypassed the Bydgoszcz Główna and Inowrocław railway stations using connecting tracks or other lines) and relatively low building density, was devoid of passenger traffic that could interfere with the movement of freight trains. The most powerful electric locomotives operated in Poland, as well as the most capacious six-axle coal wagons, were allocated to serve this line. The peak of traffic (both passenger and freight) occurred in the 1930s and 1970s, when, due to large-scale coal production and exports, train congestion was common on the line. Freight trains serving local industry had a minimal share in the overall transport work.

== Bibliography ==
- Kotlarz, Grzegorz; Dąbrowski, Henryk; Wieczorek, Edward (2008). Magistrala Węglowa [Coal Trunk-Line] (in Polish). Rybnik: Eurosprinter. ISBN 978-83-926946-0-1.
- Stankiewicz, Ryszard; Stiasny, Marcin (2014). Atlas Linii Kolejowych Polski 2014 [Atlas of Railway Lines in Poland 2014] (in Polish). Rybnik: Eurosprinter. ISBN 978-83-63652-12-8.
