= Baltiysky District =

One of a current and historic district in Russia

Location of Kaliningrad Oblast in Russia

Baltiysky District is the name of several administrative and municipal districts in Russia.

== Districts of the federal subjects ==
- Baltiysky District, Kaliningrad Oblast, an administrative and municipal district of Kaliningrad Oblast

== Historical city divisions ==
- Baltiysky Administrative District, Kaliningrad, a former administrative district of the city of Kaliningrad, Kaliningrad Oblast

== See also ==
- Baltiysky (disambiguation)
