= Baltica (festival) =

Folklore festival in Baltic states

Baltica is an international folklore festival, which every year takes place in a different Baltic states. The festival takes place under the auspices of International Council of Organizations of Folklore Festivals and Folk Arts (CIOFF).

First festival took place in 1987. In 1990, the festival didn't take place.

If the festival took place in Estonia, the main organizer is Estonian Folklore Council.
