= Baltiysky (inhabited locality) =

Baltiysky (Russian: Балти́йский; masculine), Baltiyskaya (Балти́йская; feminine), or Baltiyskoye (Балти́йское; neuter) is the name of several rural localities in Russia:

- Baltiysky (rural locality), a settlement in Baltiysky Selsoviet of Kursky District of Stavropol Krai
- Baltiyskoye, a logging depot settlement under the administrative jurisdiction of Primorskoye Settlement Municipal Formation, Vyborgsky District, Leningrad Oblast
