= Baltic (steamship) =

Several steamships have been named Baltic:

- SS Baltic (1850) — a wooden-hulled sidewheel steamer with the American Collins Line, which held the Blue Riband from 1851 to 1857
- SS Baltic (1871) — a passenger ship of the White Star Line which held the eastbound transatlantic record from 1873 to 1875
- RMS Baltic (1903) — a White Star ocean liner which was the world's largest passenger ship in 1905
- SS Baltic (1906) — a Danish cargo ship sunk in a collision in 1924
