= Inowrocław railway station =

Railway station in Inowrocław, Poland

Coordinates: 52.8055°N 18.2443°E

Inowrocław
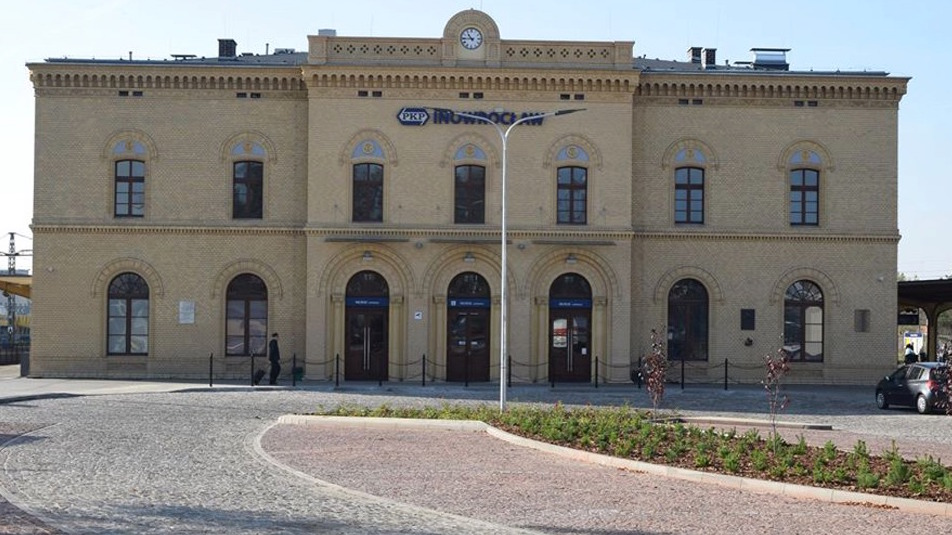
- Inowrocław railway station

General information
- Location: Inowrocław, Kuyavian-Pomeranian Voivodeship; Poland
- System: Railway Station
- Operator: PKP; Polregio
- Lines: 131: Chorzów–Tczew railway 353: Poznań–Skandawa railway
- Platforms: 6

History
- Opened: 26 May 1872; 154 years ago
- Rebuilt: 2013-
- Former names: Hohensalza
Location
- Location within Poland

Inowrocław railway station is a railway station serving the town of Inowrocław, in the Kuyavian-Pomeranian Voivodeship, Poland. The station opened in 1872 and is located on the Chorzów–Tczew railway and Poznań–Skandawa railway. The train services are operated by PKP and Polregio.

The station is an important junction for trains towards northern Poland, via Bydgoszcz and to eastern Poland via Toruń. There is a large freight yard west of the station, as well as freight lines avoiding the station.

== Modernisation ==
Modernisation work of the station has been ongoing since September 2013 with it expected to be completed in 2017.

== Train services ==
The station is served by the following services:

- EuroCity services (EC) (EC 95 by DB) (IC by PKP) Berlin - Frankfurt (Oder) - Rzepin - Poznan - Inowroclaw - Bydgoszcz - Gdansk - Gdynia
- Intercity services Wroclaw / Zielona Gora - Poznan - Inowroclaw - Bydgoszcz - Gdansk - Gdynia
- Intercity services Krakow - Lodz - Kutno - Konin - Poznan - Inowroclaw - Bydgoszcz
- Intercity services Wroclaw / Zielona Gora - Poznan - Inowroclaw - Torun - Ilawa - Olsztyn - Elk - Bialystok
- Regional services (R) Poznan - Gniezno - Mogilno - Inowroclaw - Bydgoszcz
- Regional services (R) Poznan - Gniezno - Mogilno - Inowroclaw - Torun

Preceding station	PKP Intercity	Following station
Gniezno towards Berlin Hbf	EuroCity EC 95; IC	Bydgoszcz Główna towards Gdynia Główna
Preceding station	Polregio	Following station
Janikowo towards Poznań Główny	PR	Jaksice towards Bydgoszcz Główna
Janikowo towards Poznań Główny	PR	Więcławice towards Toruń Główny
