= French–Polish Rail Association =

French-Polish railway company (1931 - 1939)

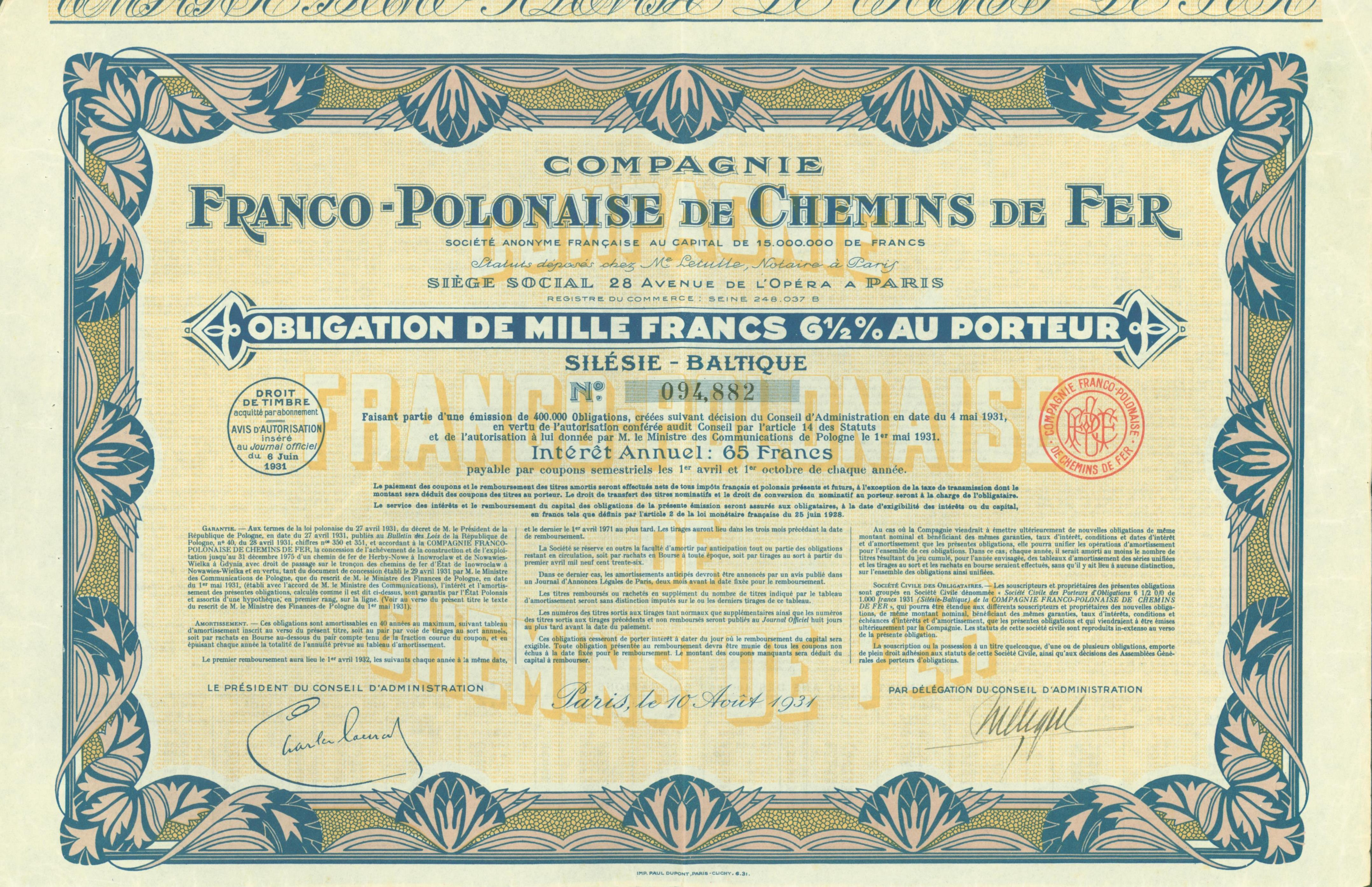
Bond of the Compagnie Franco-Polonaise de Chemins de Fer S. A., issued 10. August 1931

French–Polish Rail Association (Polish: Francusko-Polskie Towarzystwo Kolejowe, FPTK, French: Compagnie Franco-Polonaise de Chemins de Fer, CFPCF) was a Joint-stock company, established in 1931 to complete construction and then usage of the Polish Coal Trunk-Line. Its offices were in Paris, Warsaw, and Bydgoszcz. Its manager in chief was a Frenchman, Charles Laurent.

In the early 1920s, the Polish government decided to construct a rail line connecting Polish part of Upper Silesia with Baltic Sea coast. The Polish Coal Trunk-Line was one of the biggest investments of the Second Polish Republic, and its construction, until 1930, was funded by the government. However, the Great Depression caused growing budget problems for the Polish State Railways, and completion of the line was questioned. Under the circumstances, the Polish government decided that the newly created French-Polish Rail Association would take over construction of the middle sector of the line.

The Association was officially created on April 21, 1931, in Paris. Its shareholders were the Polish Bank Gospodarstwa Krajowego and the French Banque des Pays du Nord, as well as industrial giant Schneider et Creusot, which since 1924 had been part of a French–Polish Consortium for construction of the port in Gdynia. Furthermore, Schneider et Creusot was a shareholder of some Upper Silesian coal mines and steel plants, and for these reasons, the corporation was vividly interested in completion of the line. Founder’s capital was 15 million French francs.

The French-Polish Rail Association took over construction of the following sectors of the line:

- Herby Nowe - Inowrocław,
- Nowa Wieś Wielka - Bydgoszcz Wschód Towarowa - Gdynia Port.

Additionally, FPTK began construction of a line Chorzew Siemkowice - Częstochowa, which was finished in April 1939. It joined the Polish Coal Trunk-Line with the industrial city of Częstochowa.

The Association was granted the use of the line for 40 years; however, the Polish government assured the right to buy the line after 20 years. In the agreement, the Poles made sure that during construction, Polish workers would be employed, and Polish material would be used. Trains of the Polish State Railways were allowed to use the line without restrictions. Military and mail transports were granted the same privileges as they enjoyed on all government-owned lines. To finance all projects, the Association took a loan from a French bank, with the Polish government as a voucher.

On Wednesday, March 1, 1933, the 156-kilometer segment Zduńska Wola Karsznice - Inowrocław was opened, which resulted in immediate opening of rail cargo traffic along the whole line. The opening ceremony took place at the newly built rail station at Karsznice, and it was broadcast by the Polish Radio. The line, with double track along its route, was not completely ready until 1937. Due to a lack of finances needed to buy rail engines and cars, from 1933 to 1937, FPTK allowed Polish Railways to temporarily use the Trunk Line, until January 1, 1938, when the line was handed back to the Association. The national budget of Poland yielded an annual profit of 12 million zlotys from taxes and dividends from use of the line. In August 1938, in order to assure closer cooperation with authority of the port of Gdynia, FPTK became part of The Council of the Port. In the 1930s, general manager of the Association was a Frenchman Charles Laurent, and his deputy - Julian Piasecki. Since 1936, general office of FPTK was located in the office building in Bydgoszcz, which had been the headquarters of the Prussian Eastern Railway.
