= Trams in Toruń =

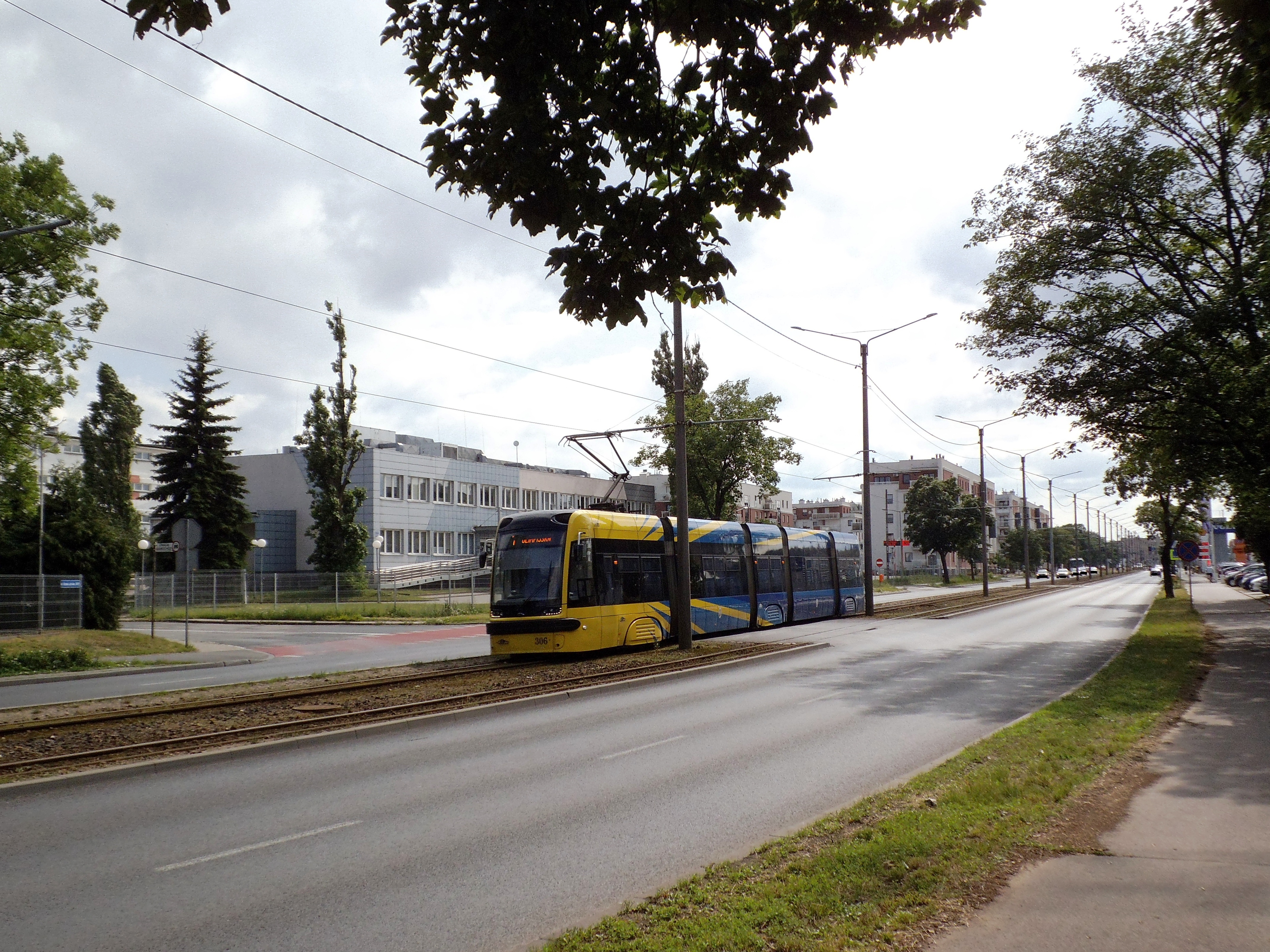
- Pesa Swing in Toruń, 2015

Operation
- Locale: Toruń, Poland

Statistics
Horsecar era: 1891–1899
- Operators: Havestadt & Contag
- Propulsion system: Horses
Electric trams era: 1899–present
- Status: Operational
- Routes: 7
- Operator: MZK Toruń
- Track gauge: 1,000 mm (3 ft 3 3/8 in)
- Propulsion system: Electricity
- Electrification: 600 V DC parallel overhead lines
- Depot: Ul. Henryka Sienkiewicza
- Stock: 27x Konstal 805Na; 18x Konstal 805NaND; 22x Pesa Swing
- Track length (total): 28 km (17 mi)
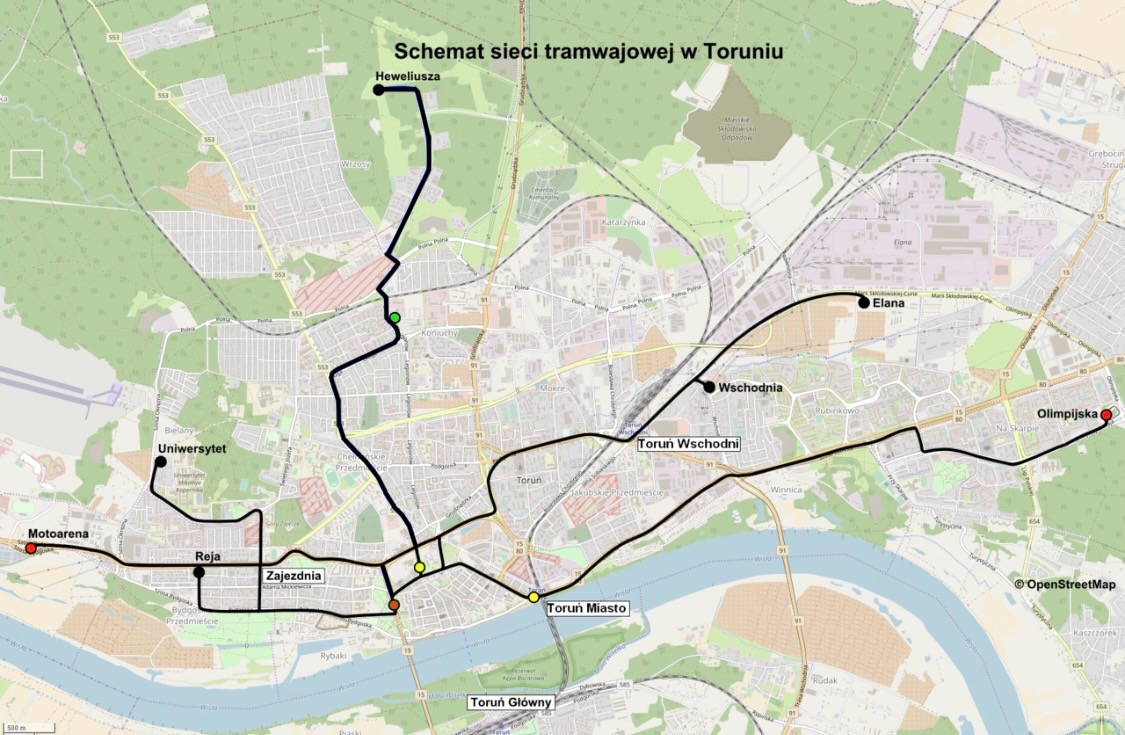
- Website: www.mzk.torun.pl

The Toruń tram system is a tramway in Toruń, Poland that has been in operation since 1891. The system is operated by Miejski Zakład Komunikacji w Toruniu (MZK Toruń). There are 7 tramlines with a total line length of 54.3 kilometres (33.7 mi). The system operates on 28 kilometres (17 mi) of route on 1,000 mm (3 ft 3 3/8 in) metre gauge (narrow gauge) track. The entire rolling stock of the tram system numbers 67 trams, 22 newer Pesa Swing trams, and 45 older Konstal 805Na Trams. The entire tramline runs on double tracks and uses balloon loops.

Today, the entire tram network is located on the northern side of the Vistula River, even though a large portion of the city extends southwards. Therefore, the tram system does not serve the cities main railway station.

== History ==
=== Beginnings ===
Havestadt & Contag opened the first horse-drawn tram line on 16 May 1891, running from Toruń Miasto to the neighborhood of Bydgoszczskie Przedmieście. The Tram Line was electrified in 1899, and in December 1901, the city of Toruń took over responsibility for the maintenance and expansion of the tram line. In 1902, the city opened a second tram line to the Mokre, and in 1907, a third line to Chełmiński Przedmieście. Further expansion of the line was proposed, but ultimately halted by the outbreak of World War I.

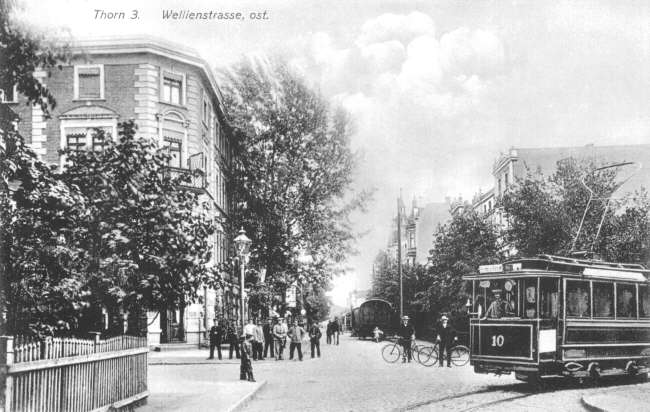
Tram line shortly after electrification

Following the conclusion of the First World War, Operation of the tramway was taken over by the Second Polish Republic. Most of the rolling stock was in extremely poor condition, and all operations ceased for three months in 1921 to allow for repairs of the trams. In 1934, the fourth tram line began operation to Toruń Główny railway station, bringing trams to the south of the city. A 5th line to Jakubskie Przedmieście was completed in 1935.

=== World War II ===
During World War II, the city of Toruń was captured on 7 September 1939 by the advancing German Army. Shortly before the capture of the city, the Józef Piłsudski Bridge was destroyed by the Polish Army, thus cutting off the southern side of the city.

During the war, the tram network was run by the Germans and resumed normal operation. The Germans built a temporary wooden bridge that could carry buses to the other side of the Vistula River. These buses replaced the previous tram line across the river until a replacement bridge was completed in 1950. During the final months of World War II, all tram lines sustained significant damage. The tram network ceased operation for a few months until repairs could be made.

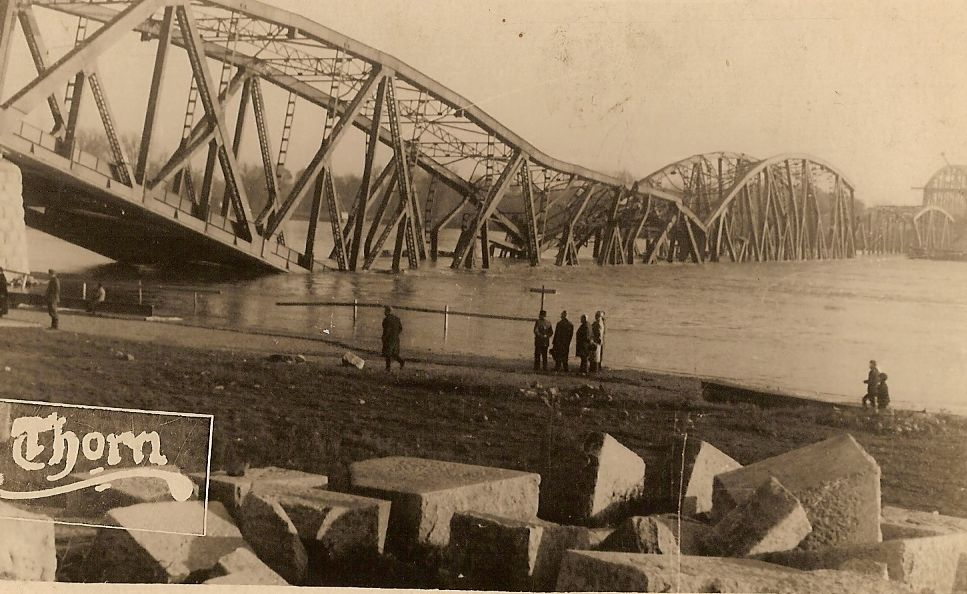
Destroyed Józef Piłsudski Bridge

=== 1945-1991 ===
In 1955, the line in Chełmiński Przedmieście began an extension to, first, the railway station of Pólnoncy, and then later, in 1958, the line was extended to Wrzosy.

The 1970s and early 1980s were a huge time of expansion for the Tram Network. In 1970, the tramway was rerouted and no longer traveled through the center of the city. In 1971, an extension of the west terminus was moved to the current day Motoarena. In 1974, a tram line to Elana was completed. In 1979, The tram line on Grudzaidzka Street was completely rerouted onto the neighboring Przy Kaszowniku Street. This realighment was connected to the center of the city with the extension of the line from Dworzec Wshodnia to Petla Wshodnia in 1980.

In 1981, the line to Jakubskie Przedmieście was extended to Ślaskiego. Then in 1986, this line was further extended to Olimpijska, where the current eastern end of the Tram network ends. Also in 1986, a tram line was built along Kraszewkiego Street.

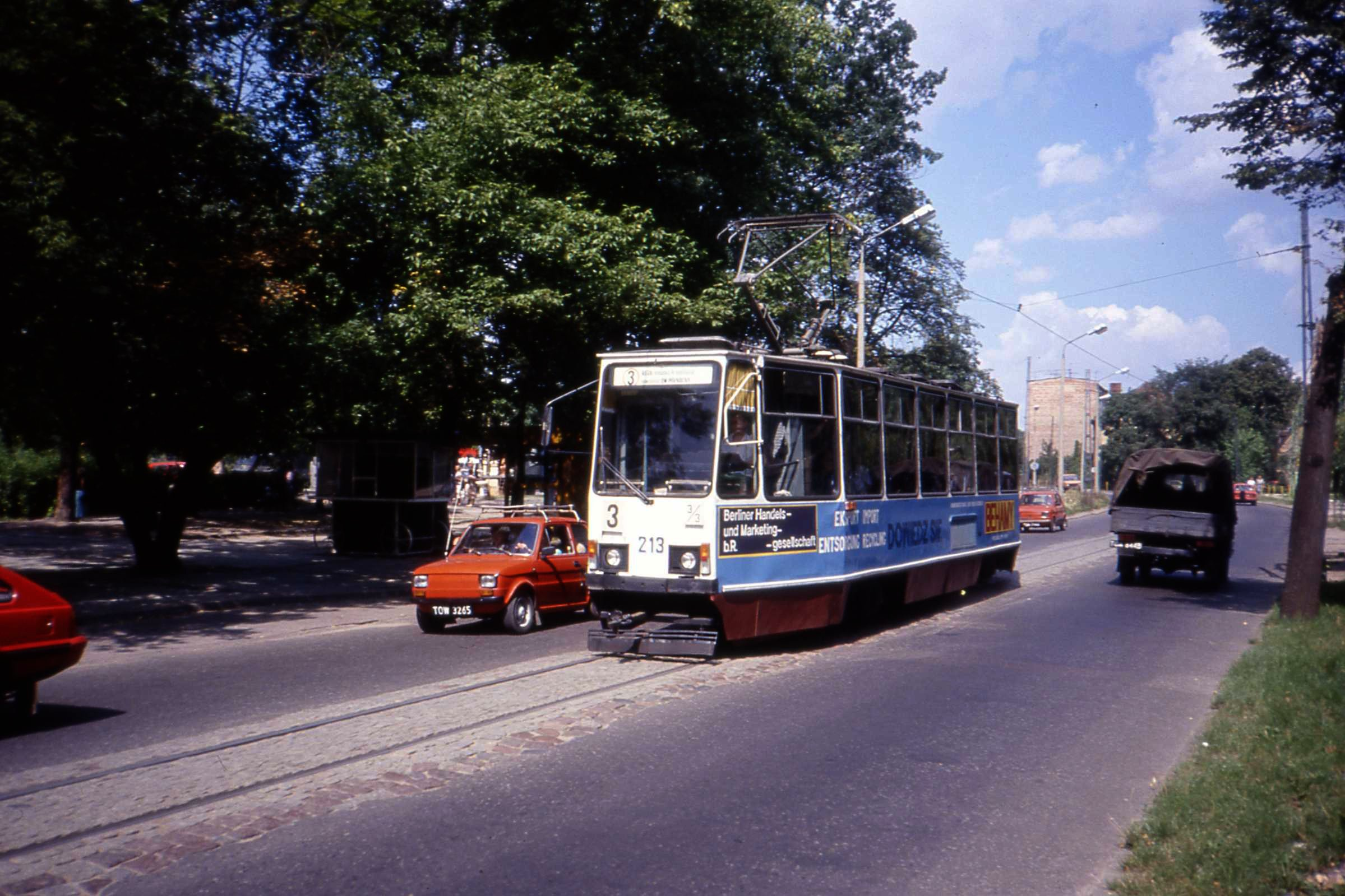
Konstal 805Na on now dismantled line to Polnoncy in 1990

During the late 1980s, The Expansion of tram lines was halted and replaced by new bus lines instead. Many lines were liquidated during this time, including the tram Line on the Jòzef Piłsudski Bridge to the Toruń Główny was closed and converted into exclusively a road bridge. Since then, Trams in Toruń have exclusively operated on the northern bank of the Vistula. Other liquidations included the line to Wroszy, which was first reduced to Station of Toruń Pólnoncy in 1972. Later, in 1991, after the closure of the station, the line was completely dismantled.

=== 1992-Present ===
In 2011, the tram line on Wshodnia street was dismantled.

A 1.7-kilometre (1.1 mi) extension was built to serve Nicolaus Copernicus University in Toruń. It was originally projected to open in 2013, but the extension ultimately opened for service on 24 June 2014.

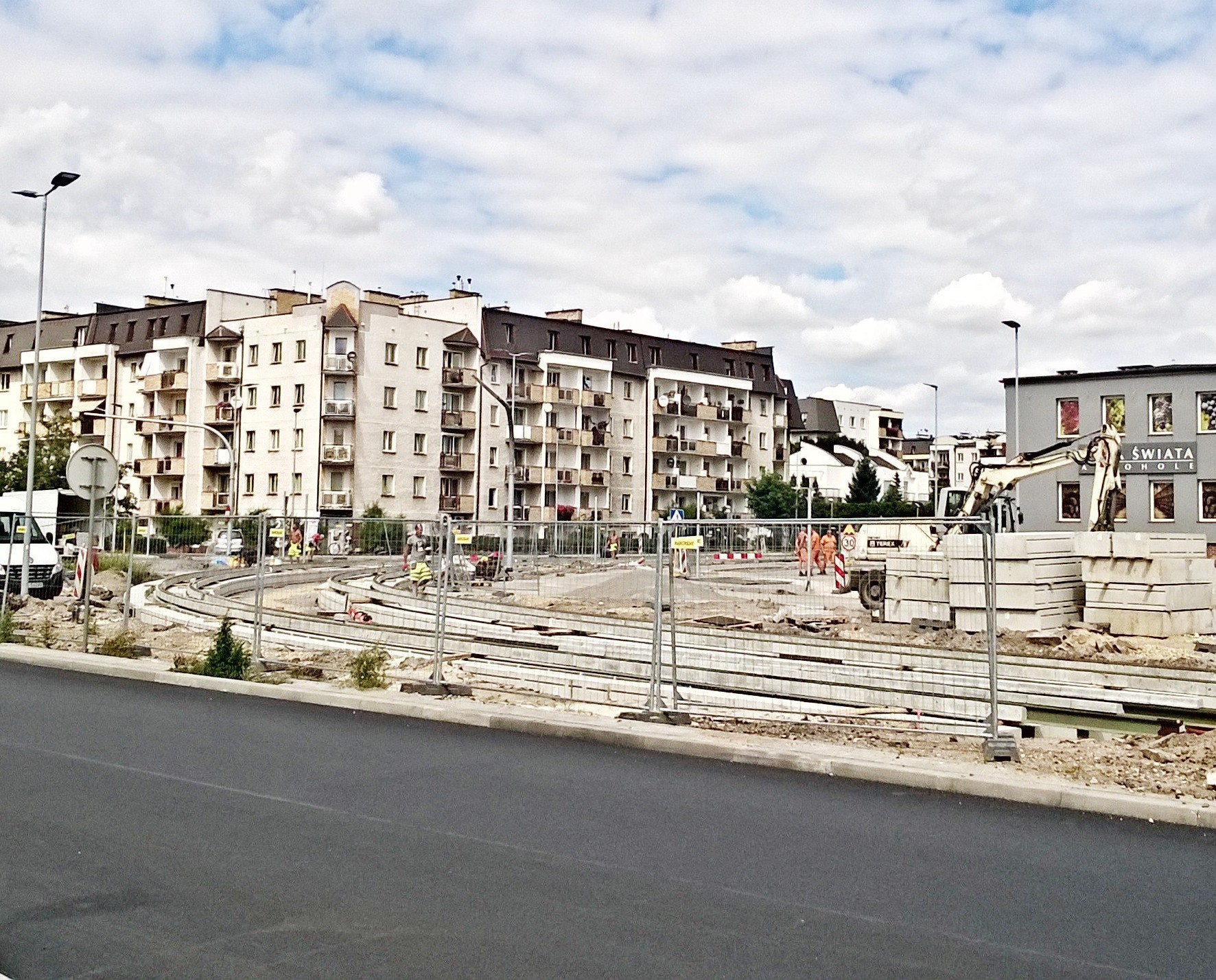
Construction of the line extension to Osiedle Jar

The most recent extension, built to serve the Osiedle Jar housing estate in the north of the town, was inaugurated on 25 August 2023 and started normal passenger operations on 1 September 2023.

== Future ==
There are currently several plans to extend the City of Toruń tram network. These plans are in different stages of planning or consideration

Beginning in 2026, construction of a line extension from the MotoArena Toruń to Starotoruńskie Przedmieście is planned. A new tram depot is planned at the new eastern terminus, a bus depot is also planned.

In 2025, there was a proposal by the mayor to link the southern side of the city to the tram network. This plan would involve building a new bridge over the vistula river.

Currently, there are plans to link Olimpiska P&R to Elana, forming a complete loop of the system and extending Tram lines 2 and 4 to Olimpiska

There are also long-term plans to connect the Toruń Tram system to Bydgoszcz to facilitate a new connection between the metropolitan areas. The Tram Line was included in a 2030 plan, with a new bridge across the Vistula River near Bydgoszcz. This Tram line would have a travel time of 70 minutes. The line would serve to further link the Bydgoszcz–Toruń metropolitan area

== Tram lines ==
There are 7 regular tram lines in Toruń. There is also a Tourist/Event line and a Night-time line.

All lines regular except 7 on the network run every 30 minutes during weekends and off-peak hours, and every 20 minutes during peak hours. The peak hours are usually 7AM-8AM, and 1PM-4PM The city does not run more trams during peak hours during times schools are not in session.

Line 7 runs every 30 minutes on Weekdays except when school is not in session, when it only runs during peak hours.

An 8th line occasionally serves large amounts of traffic at the MotoArena Toruń. The 8th line is also occasionally used as a tourist line running historical vehicles during the summer tourist season.

Line "9" is the city's night tram; it runs occasionally during tourist season weekends, as well as local festivities and holidays.

Daily	all day	1, 2, 3, 4, 5, 6, 7
Weekdays only	all day	N/A
Weekdays only	peak hours only	N/A
Replacement Line	Temporary	8
Night Tram	seasonal during summer weekends, and holidays/local festivies	9

=== Operational ===
Line	Map	Route	Number of stops	Circuit Time	Frequency
1		Uniwersytet – Olimpiska P&R – via Toruń Miasto PKP,	25	35	Weekdays off-peak 30; Weekdays peak 20; Weekends 30; Holidays 45
2		Motoarena – Elana via Dworczec Wschodni	20	30	Weekdays off-peak 30; Weekdays peak 20; Weekends 30; Holidays 45
3		Motoarena – Heweliusza via Plac Rapackiego	26	34	Weekdays off-peak 30; Weekdays peak 20; Weekends 30; Holidays 45
4		Uniwersytet – Elana via Dworczec Wschodni	21	30	Weekdays off-peak 30; Weekdays peak 20; Weekends 30; Holidays 45
5		Motoarena – Olimpijska P&R via Toruń Miasto	24	34	Weekdays off-peak 30; Weekdays peak 20; Weekends 30; Holidays 45
6		Hewelisuza – Olimpijska P&R via Toruń Miasto	28	40	Weekdays off-peak 30; Weekdays peak 20; Weekends 30; Holidays 45
7		Uniwersytet – Wshodnia – via Plac Rapackiego	22	34	30

=== Suspended/Not Running ===
Line	Map	Route	Number of stops	Circuit Time	Frequency
8		Motoarena – Aleja Solidarności; REPLACEMENT TRAM	8/11	12	15
9		Uniwersytet – Aleja Solidarności; SEASONAL NIGHT TRAM	11	13	Piernikaliami 20-30; Juwenalia 20-30

== Rolling stock ==
=== Current Operational Fleet ===
Type	Production	Number	Low-floor
Konstal 805Na	1980	27	No
Konstal 805NaND (modernised 805Na)	2007	18	No
122NbT Swing	2014	6	Yes
121NbT Swing	2015	6	Yes
122NbTDuo Swing	2015	5	Yes
122NaT Swing	2021-2022	5	Yes
Total		67	32%

=== Historical fleet ===
Type	Production	Restored
Konstal 5N	1960	1993

=== Technical Fleet ===
Type	Production
Konstal 5N	1960

== Infrastructure ==
=== Termini ===
==== Current ====
Name	Schematic	Opening Year	Tracks	Lines	Notes
Motoarena		1971	3 (Note: Does not include two unused tracks.)	2, 3, 5	Also occasionally used by Line 8 (Event Tram)
Wcshodnia		1974	2	7	Southern Tracks Abandoned
Elana		1974	1	2, 4	Rebuilt in 2012
Olimpska Park&Ride		1984	5 + 2	1, 5, 6	
Uniwerstet		2014	2	1, 4, 7	Also occasionally used by Line 9 (Night Tram)
Heweliusza		2023	2	3, 6	

==== Former ====
Name	Schematic	Opening Year	Closing Date	Tracks	Lines (Formerly)	Closing Reason
Dworzec Główny		1954	1984	1	4, 6	Lidquidation of Line to Toruń Główny in order to convert bridge to exclusively road traffic.
Wroszy		1958	1972	1	3	Lidquidation of Line.
Toruń Północny		1955	1991	1	3	Closure of Toruń Północny Station. Whole Line was Liquidated.
Ślaskiego		1981	1988	2	1, 4, 5	Extension of line to Olimpska P&R
Wshodnia		1917	1976	1		Realingment of Track

=== Bus Exchange Stops ===
Name	Schematic	Opening Year	Lines	Notes
Plac Rapackiego		2020	3, 5, 7, 10, 11, 12, 13, 14, 20, 21, 22, 27, 32, 131, 151, 152	Track Originally Built in 1927
Aleja Solidarności		2014	1, 3, 6, 7, 10, 12, 13, 14, 20, 21, 22, 27, 30, 31, 32, 38, 111, 112, 115, 141, 151, 152	Previously Dismantled in the 1980s, Rebuilt in 2014 with University Extension.
Długa		2023	3, 6, 16, 34	

=== Depot ===
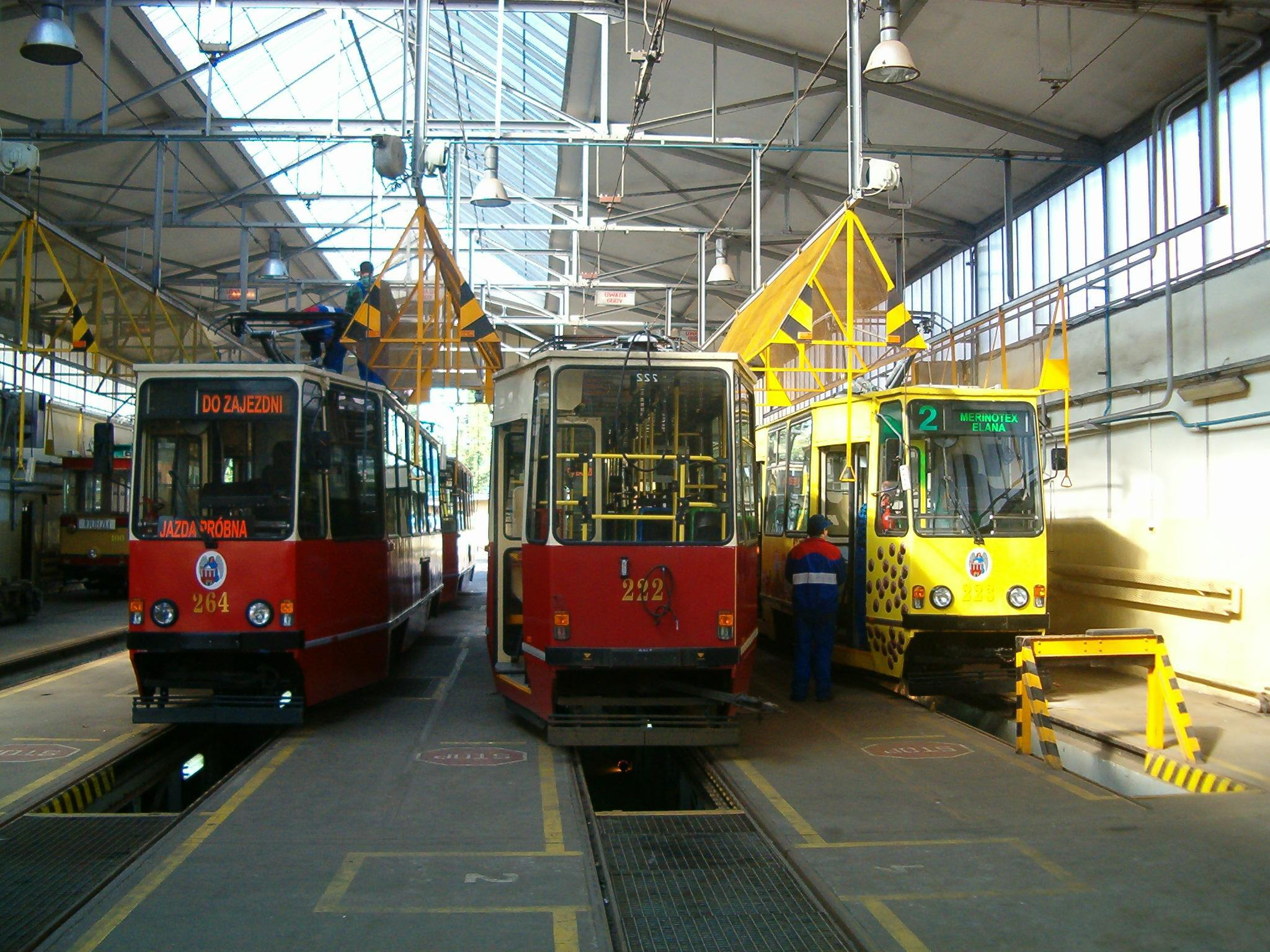
Tram Depot on Ul. Henryka Sienkiewicza

The current tram depot is located on Henryka Sienkiewicza Street. It is currently the only tram depot on the entire network.

As part of an extension project west of the MotoArena, a new tram/bus depot will be built.

== Maps ==
Line Map
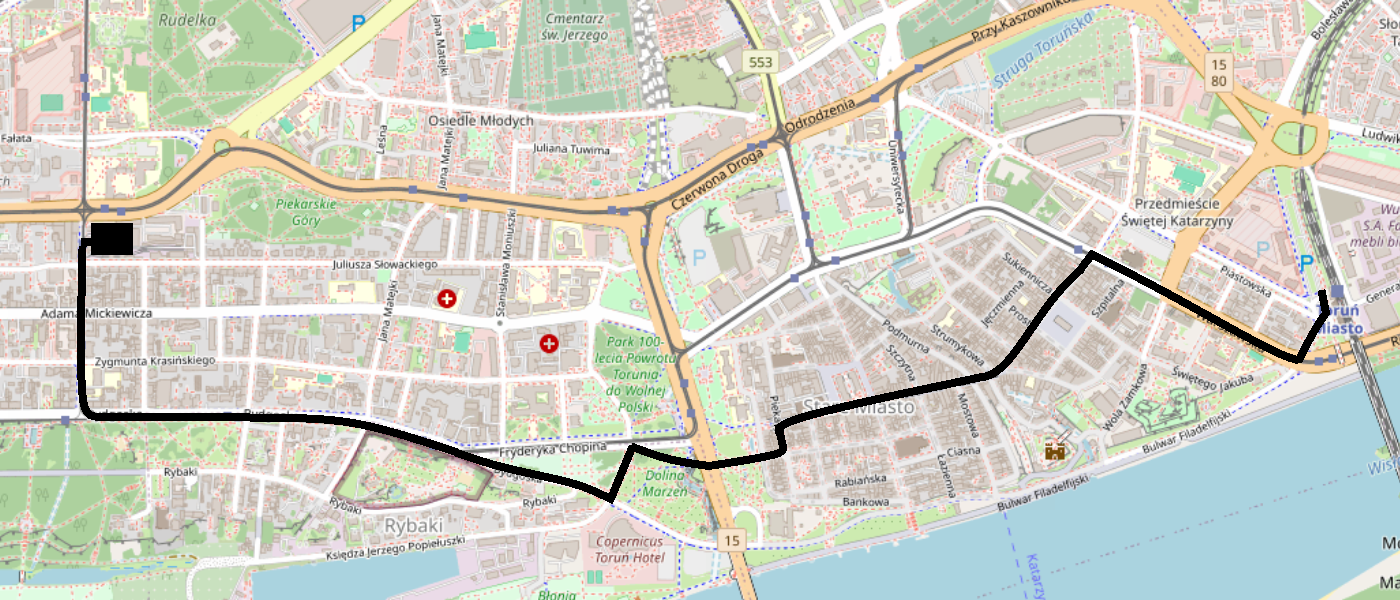
Map of Toruń Horse Tram in 1899
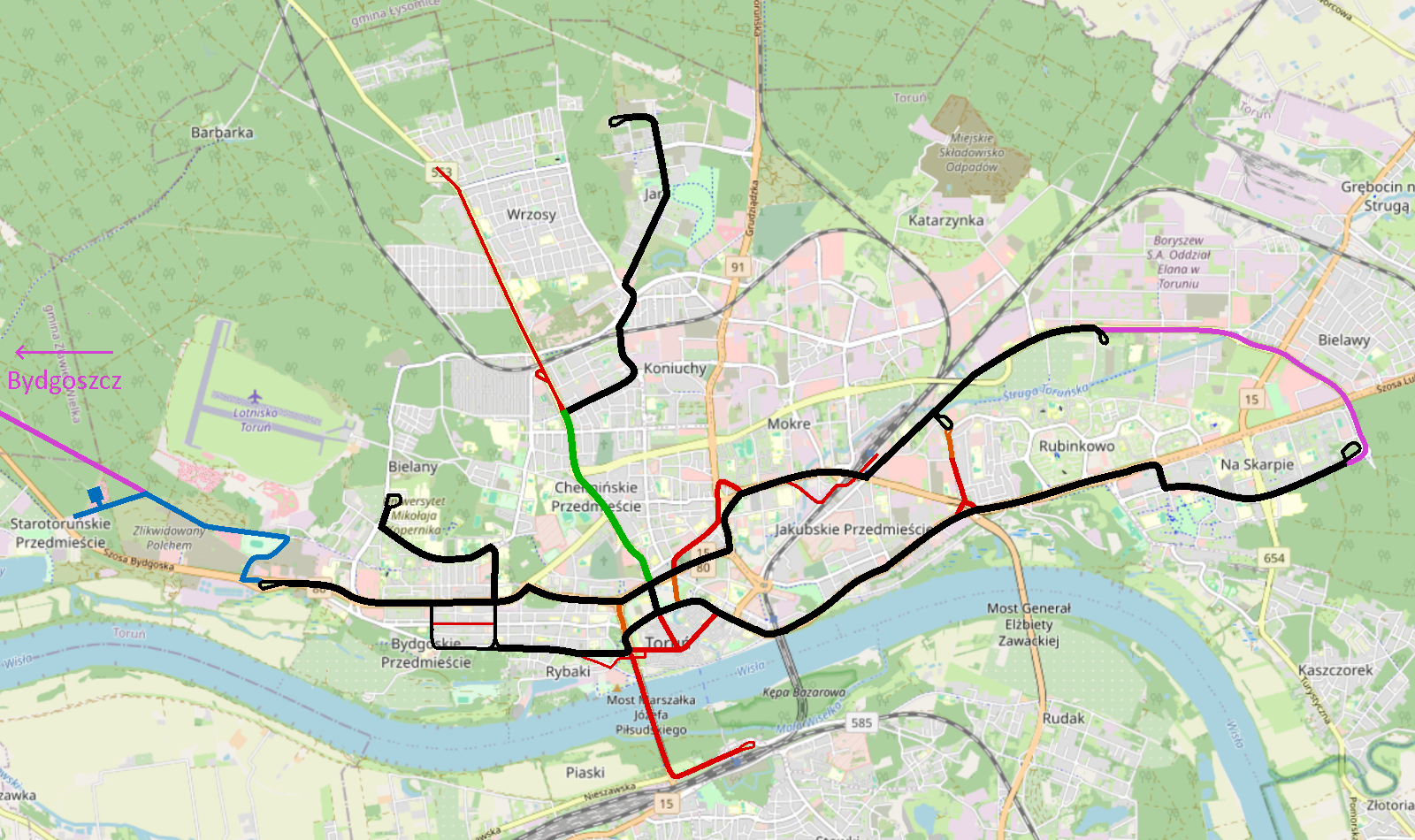
Map showing all Current, Previous, Proposed and Under-construction lines in Toruń.
Operational Tram Network
Unused Tram Network
Liquidated Tram Network
Reconstructed Tram Network
Tram Network Under Construction
Proposed Tram Network

== Gallery ==
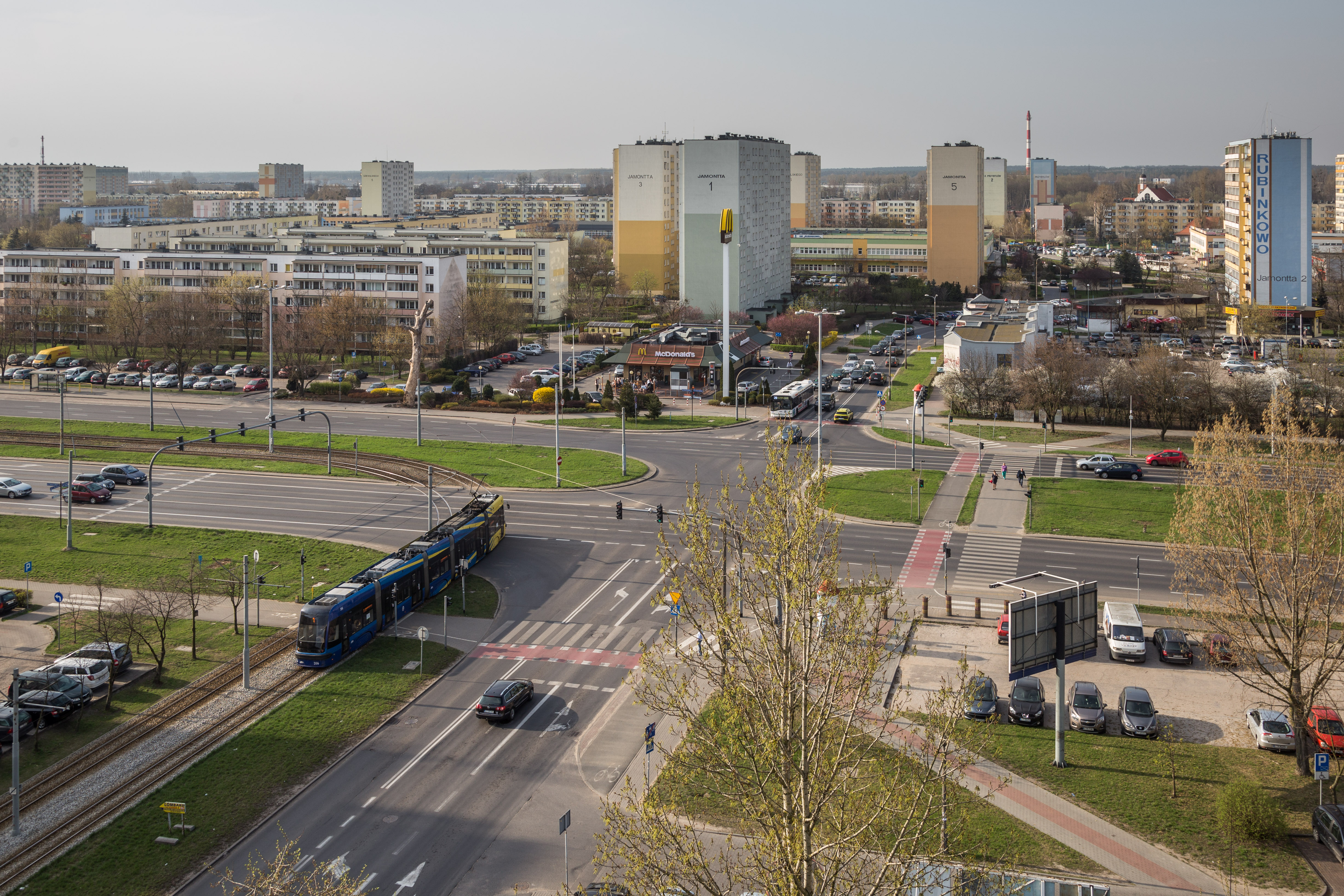
Tram line in Rubinkowo

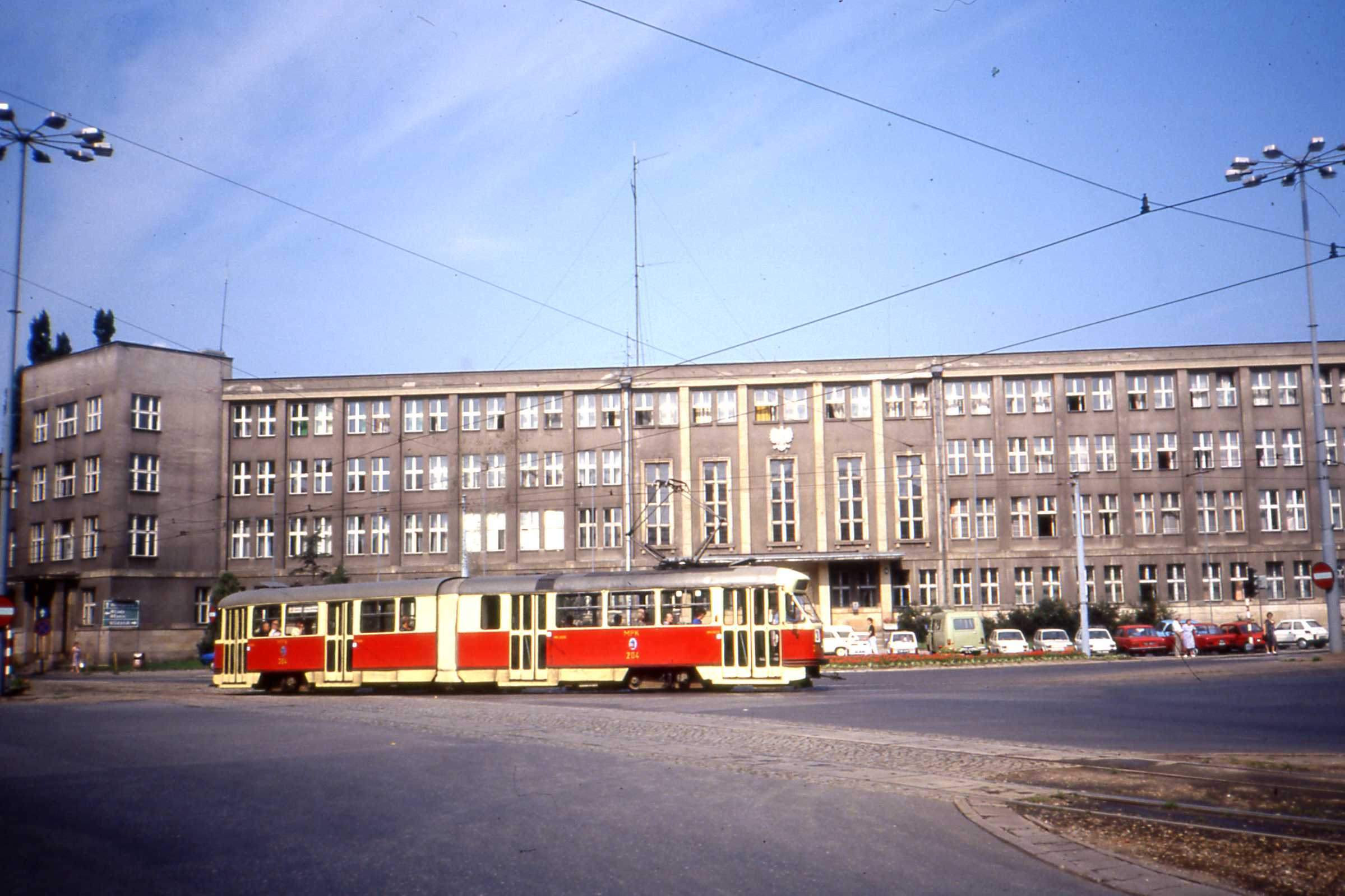
Konstal 102Na on the network in 1990

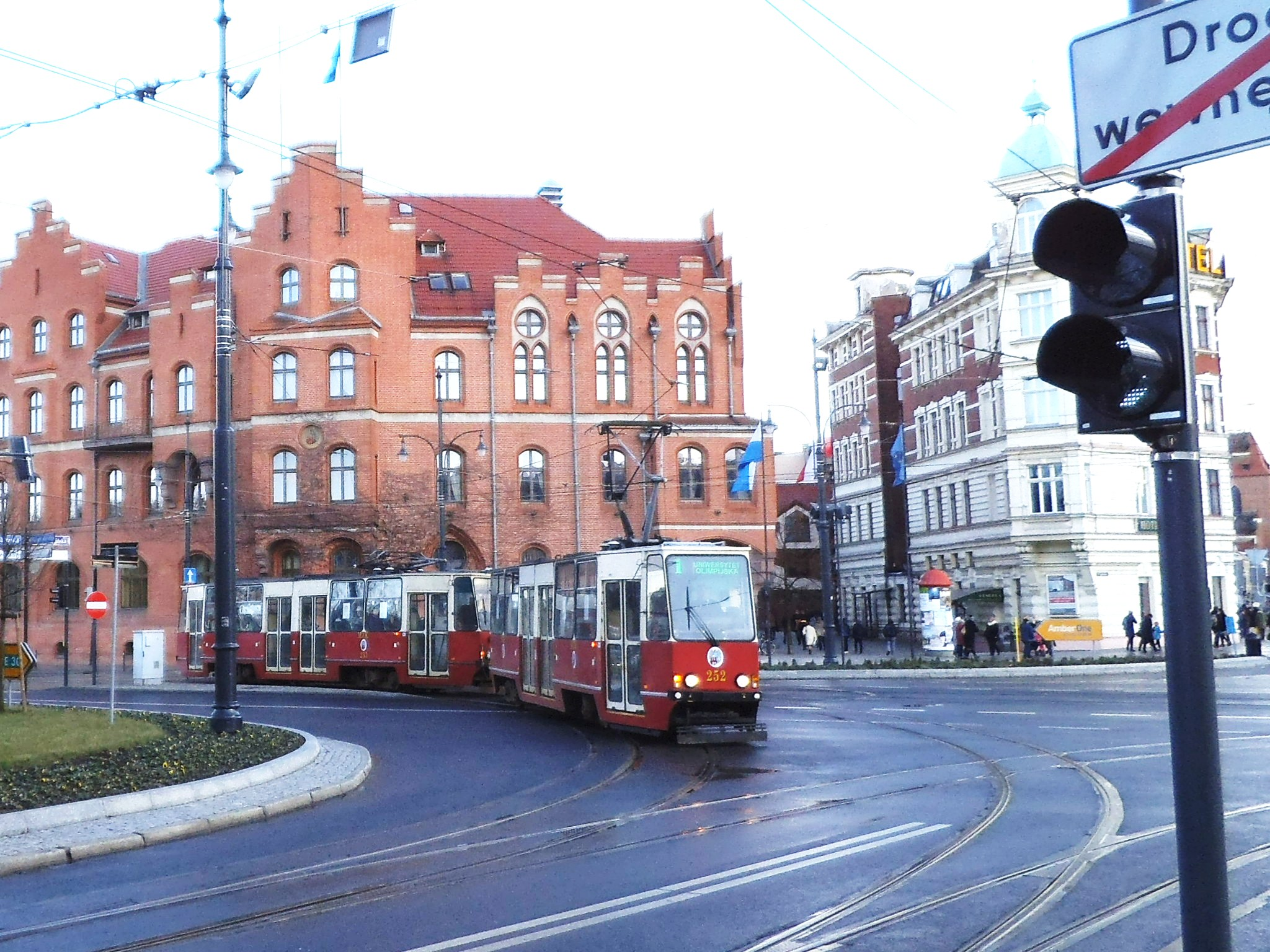
Konstal 805Na at Aleja Solidarności

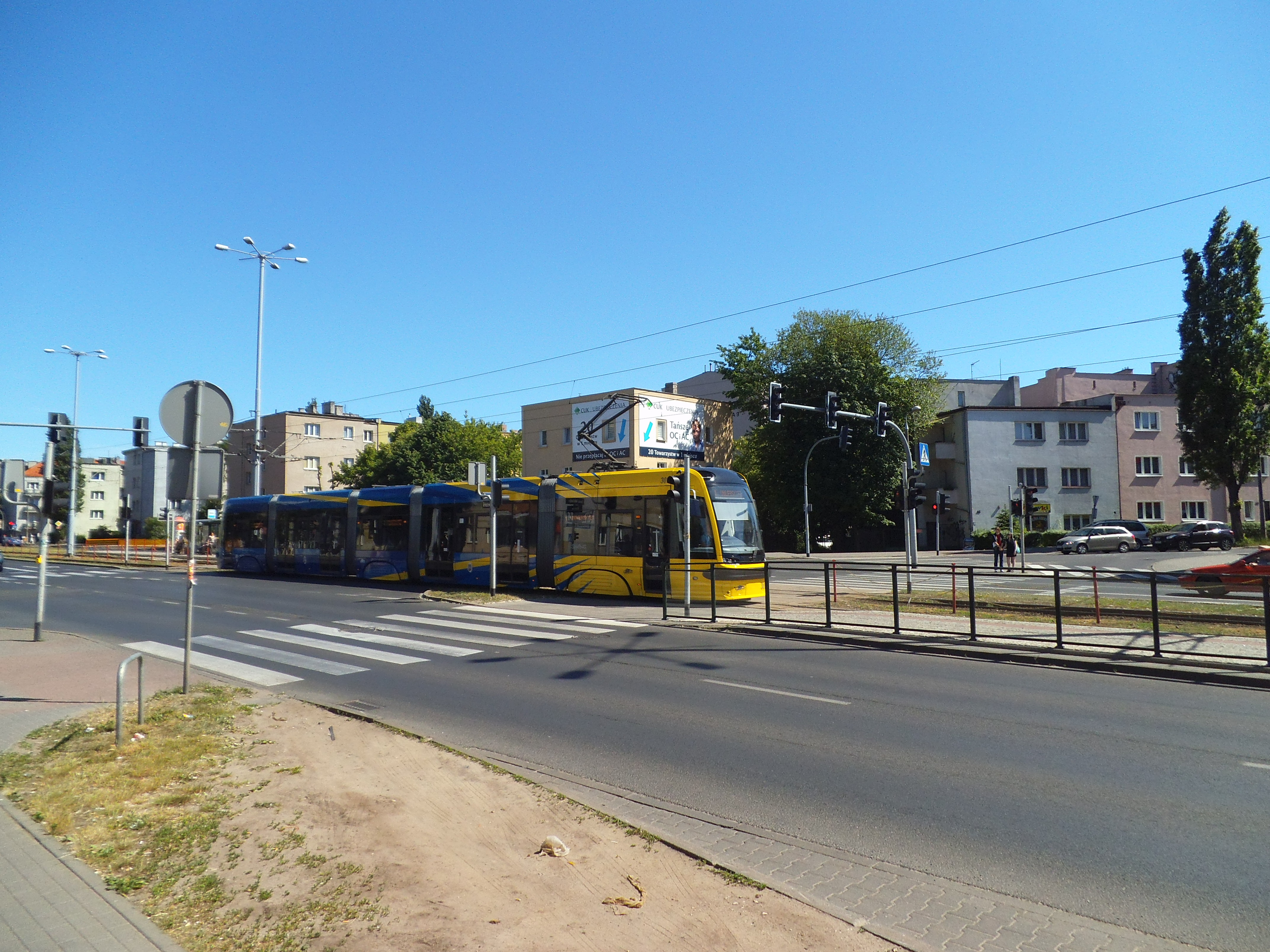
Pesa Swing at ulicy Kraszewskiego
