= Rypin railway station =

Railway station in Rypin, Poland

Rypin
- Rypin railway station

General information
- Location: Rypin, Rypin, Kuyavian–Pomeranian; Poland
- Coordinates: 53.0685895°N 19.4276249°E
- System: Rail Station
- Owner: Polskie Koleje Państwowe S.A.
- Platforms: 2
- Tracks: 3

History
- Opened: 25 May 1937; 89 years ago
- Rebuilt: 2026
- Former names: Rippin (1939–1945)

Services
Location

Rypin railway station is a railway station in Rypin, Kuyavian–Pomeranian Voivodeship, Poland. It is served by PKP Intercity.

== History ==
Prior to the construction of a standard-gauge rail network, transport in Rypin relied on a local narrow-gauge railway system with services to Golub and to Sierpc. Plans for a standard-gauge railway connecting Sierpc to Brodnica through Rypin were established under an Act passed on 2 March 1920, though construction was postponed due to the Polish–Soviet War and economic difficulties until a Presidential Decree authorized building in April 1935.

The station opened on 25 May 1937, when the Sierpc–Brodnica section of Line 33 was completed.

Following the invasion of Poland in September 1939, Rypin was annexed to Nazi Germany as part of the Reichsgau Danzig-West Prussia. The station and railway infrastructure were seized from Polish State Railways and placed under the Deutsche Reichsbahn.

German forces withdrew from Rypin in early 1945, and control of the station returned to Polish State Railways (PKP).

=== Passenger service suspension and restoration ===
Regular passenger services through Rypin were suspended on 3 April 2000 as part of nationwide reductions in PKP's passenger rail services. Until 2021, the station continued to handle freight traffic and occasional tourist excursions.

After passenger services were suspended in 2000, local authorities proposed to restore rail services. In 2012, Rypin mayor Marek Błaszkiewicz proposed constructing a new railway link toward Golub-Dobrzyń to provide direct access to Toruń, but the proposal did not proceed. Błaszkiewicz then proposed reintroducing railbus services along the existing Sierpc–Rypin–Brodnica line. In 2016, a public petition calling for the reactivation of passenger traffic along Line 33 was rejected by the Marshal's Office of the Kujawsko-Pomorskie Voivodeship, which argued that the line's route did not meet demand for direct travel toward Toruń.

Passenger services returned to Rypin on 12 December 2021 after a 21-year interruption, when PKP Intercity introduced the daily long-distance TLK Flisak train connecting Katowice and Gdynia via Rypin.

In December 2023, infrastructure manager PKP PLK announced the reconstruction of Rypin station as part of a project valued at 40.4 million PLN. The project includes changes to the track layout, modern signaling systems, upgraded level crossings, and a new high platform with passenger facilities.

Regional passenger services between Brodnica and Rypin are scheduled to resume in December 2026, with Arriva contracted to operate the service. National operator PKP Intercity has announced plans to introduce hybrid trains on Line 33 to support new routes connecting Gdynia with Warsaw and Kraków via Rypin.

== Train services ==
The station is served by the following services:

- Intercity services (TLK): Gdynia Główna – Płock – Łódź – Katowice (temporarily rerouted via Toruń due to railway infrastructure renovations)

=== Planned services ===
- Regional (R): AR418 Brodnica – Kretki – Rypin (scheduled for December 2026)
- Regional (R): Sierpc - Rypin (proposed from December 2027)
