= Polish Coal Main Line =

Railway line in Poland

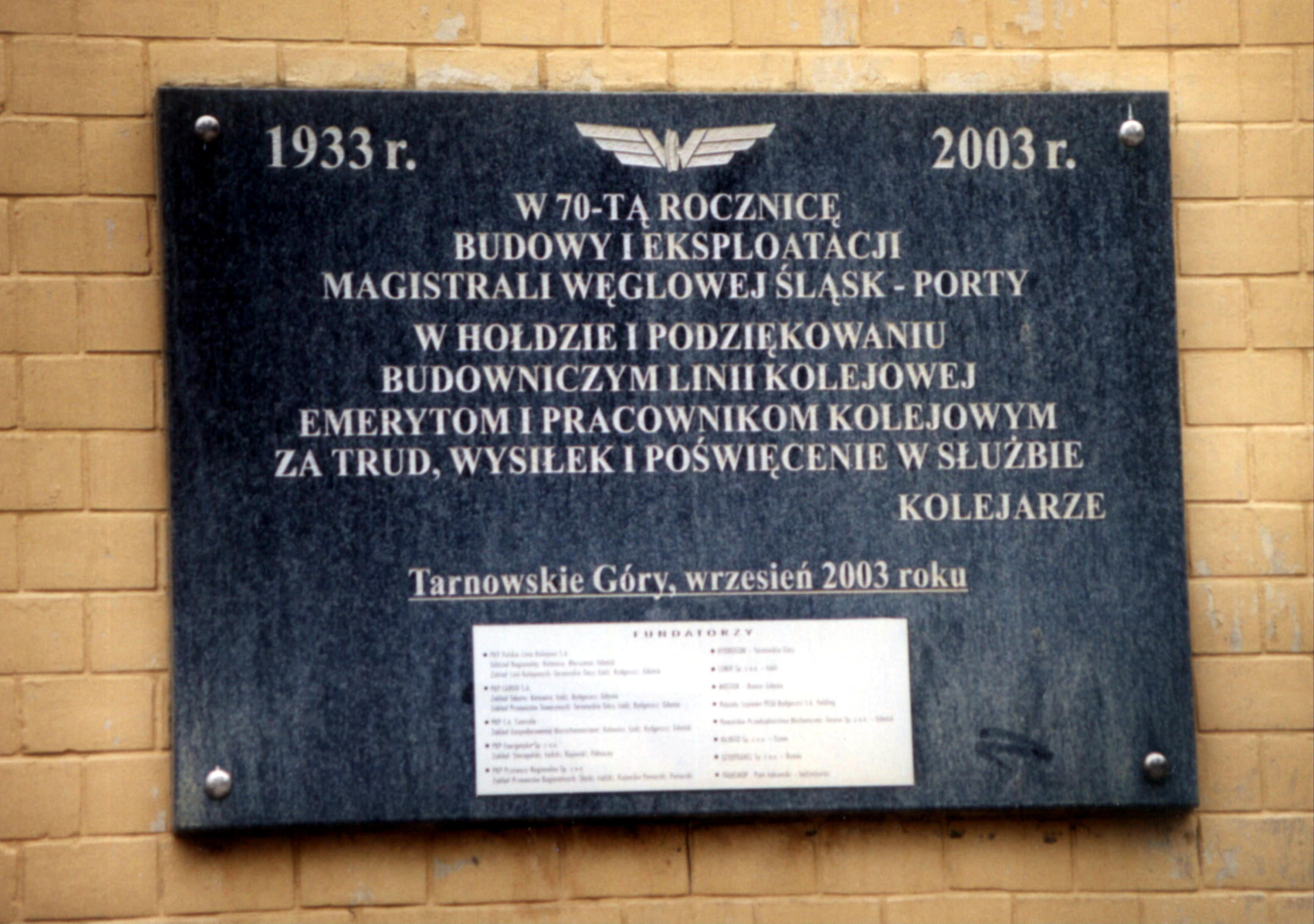
A plaque erected in 2003 for 70-years anniversary of Coal Trunkline construction in Tarnowskie Góry

The Polish Coal Main Line (Polish: Magistrala Węglowa) is a historical main line connecting Upper Silesia with Gdynia. It crosses the central part of the country, from the coal mines and steelworks of Upper Silesia in the South to the Baltic Sea port of Gdynia in the North. The line is used mostly by freight trains: passenger connections on it are few. Constructed in the late 1920s and early 1930s, it was one of the biggest investments of the Second Polish Republic.

== Route ==
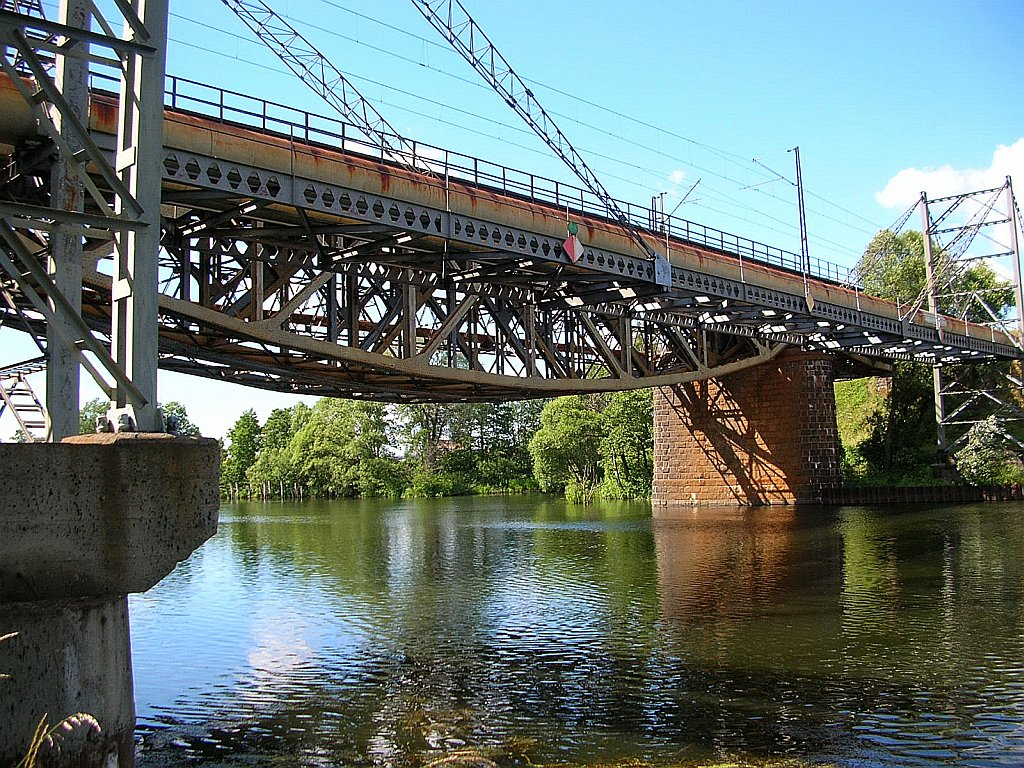
Railway bridge over Brda river in Bydgoszcz

The Coal Trunk-Line starts at the station Chorzów Batory, in the Upper Silesian city of Chorzów, heading north. After crossing almost 30 kilometers it reaches Tarnowskie Góry – a very important freight station located on the northern outskirts of the Upper Silesian Coal Basin.

Then, the line goes towards Kalety and Herby Nowe. In Herby Nowe, the Coal Trunk-Line proper begins. The connection Chorzów Batory – Kalety had been built before the 1920s, by the Germans, as these lands had belonged to Germany until 1921. Then, in 1926 a Kalety – Herby Nowe – Wieluń – Kępno line was constructed, thanks to which Upper Silesia and Poznań got a direct connection, without the necessity of using the then-German junction at Kreuzburg (Kluczbork).

From Herby Nowe, crossing the strategic junctions of Chorzew Siemkowice and Zduńska Wola Karsznice, the Coal Trunk-Line reaches Inowrocław. From there it goes to Bydgoszcz, which had already been connected to Gdańsk and Gdynia (via Laskowice and Tczew), but the creation of Free City of Danzig made it difficult to keep regular Polish freight movement in the interbellum. Thus, another part of the Coal Trunk-Line between Bydgoszcz and Gdynia was constructed in the early 1930s, via Wierzchucin and Kościerzyna and the sparsely populated forests and hills of Kashubia.

The Coal Trunk-Line ends in the Baltic Sea port of Gdynia, after crossing all of Poland from south to north (appr. 550 kilometers).

== History ==
=== Beginnings and interwar period ===
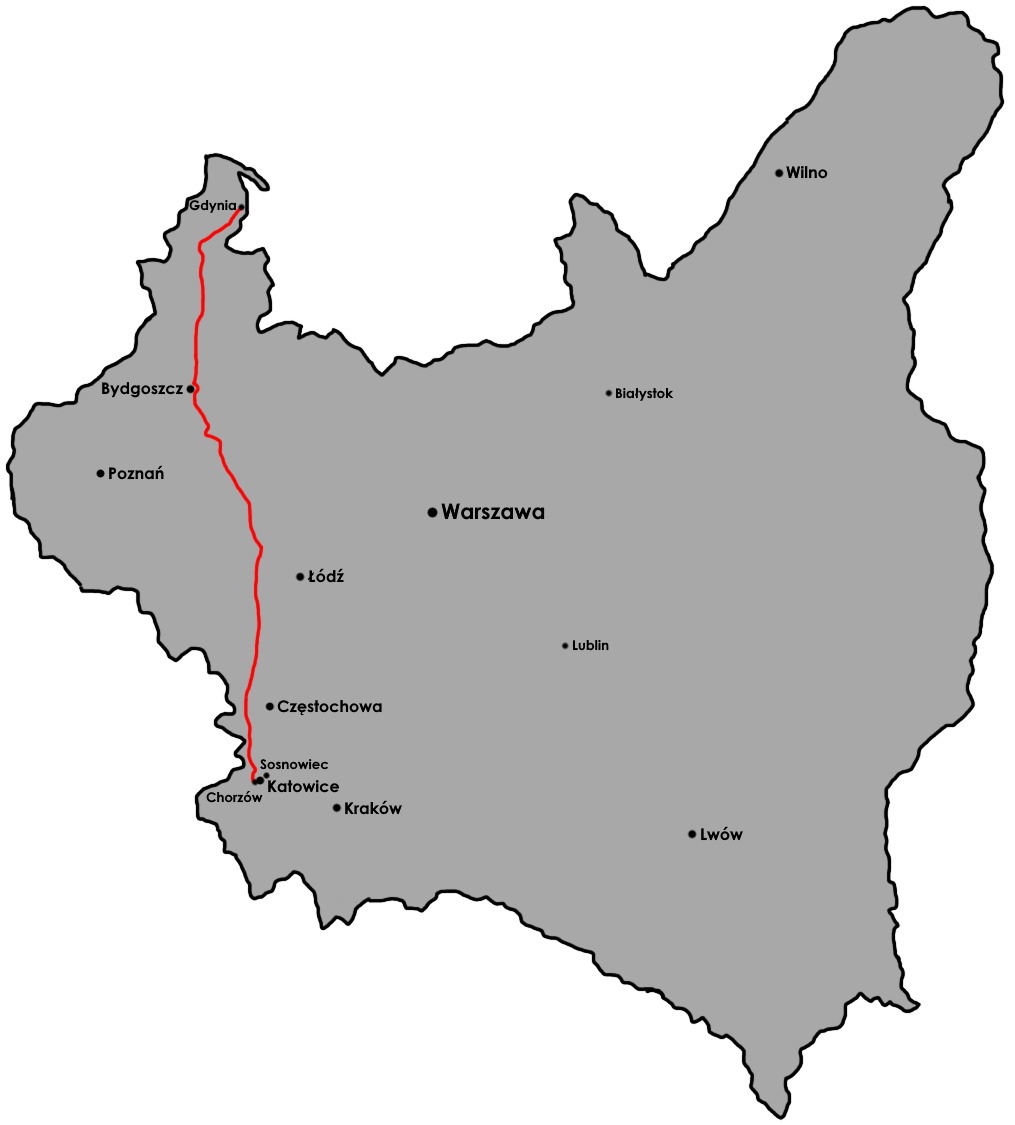
The Coal Trunk Line within the borders of the Second Polish Republic

In 1921–1922 the borders of the Second Polish Republic were finally established. Upper Silesia was divided (see: Silesian Uprisings) and the boundary left in German hands several crucial junctions, including Kluczbork (Kreuzburg) and Fosowskie (Vossowska). Without these centers, rail communication between Polish Silesia and the Baltic Sea was virtually impossible. As coal was one of the main Polish exports, and transit through Germany was not allowed (due to the German–Polish customs war in the late 1920s and early 1930s), construction of the new line was necessary.

On 17 February 1928 the President of Poland Ignacy Mościcki signed a bill which ordered the construction of the 255-kilometer line Herby Nowe – Inowrocław. For unknown reasons, the important industrial center of Łódź, located just a few kilometers east of the route, was not included in it. Instead, the Coal Trunk-Line crossed the main East-West route (Warsaw – Łódź – Ostrów Wielkopolski – Poznań) in the vicinity of the town of Zduńska Wola. As a result, a huge nexus was built in Zduńska Wola-Karsznice, which until today is one of the most important junctions of the whole country. Also, a new settlement was built there, with several condominiums for rail workers and their families. Apart from the line itself, numerous stations along the way were built. Most of them resemble traditional Polish manor houses, with very interesting architecture.

The Herby Nowe – Karsznice connection was completed by 1930, soon afterwards the route reached Inowrocław. As the line between Inowrocław and Bydgoszcz already existed, the next step was the construction of the last part – from Bydgoszcz to Gdynia, through the Polish Corridor, without entering the territory of the Free City of Danzig. The whole Coal Trunk-Line was completed by 1933, and in 1939 it was connected with Częstochowa, due to the Chorzew Siemkowice – Częstochowa route, which was finished on 23 April 1939. Also, on the same day, the second track was completed on the sector between Zduńska Wola Karsznice and Chorzew Siemkowice. Among the guests, invited for a celebration of the opening of the Częstochowa – Siemkowice connection, were the Polish minister of transportation, Juliusz Ulrich and the minister of public works of France, Anatole de Monzie.

Between the wars, long-distance passenger trains still used the Bydgoszcz – Danzig – Gdynia connection, crossing the territory of the Free City of Danzig.

=== Second World War and afterwards ===
During the Second World War German occupiers did not regard the Coal Trunk-Line as a strategic one. For them, the West – East routes were most important, along which military transports were carried. Besides, since the pre-1939 borders were voided, part of the line between Bydgoszcz and Gdynia was replaced by the Bydgoszcz – Tczew – Danzig – Gdynia connection. In spite of this, in the early 1940s, the Germans laid a second track on the routes Herby Nowe – Siemkowice (55 km) and Karsznice – Inowrocław (156 km).

After the war, the Coal Trunk-Line again gained importance. Transports of Silesian coal to Gdansk and Gdynia were crucial for the Polish economy, so by 1966 electrification of the whole route was completed. However, the original connection Bydgoszcz – Kościerzyna – Gdynia was abandoned by freight trains which go on the route Bydgoszcz – Tczew – Gdansk – Gdynia, and today is used only by local traffic.

Today, the Coal Trunk-Line is one of the most prosperous rail routes in Poland. Passenger trains are few (many passenger trains on Tczew - Inowrocław part of this line), but freight trains are very numerous, as this is the fastest way from the industrial areas of Upper Silesia, Zagłębie Dąbrowskie and Częstochowa to the Baltic ports.

The segment of the line from Bydgoszcz to Gdynia is today designated as PKP line 201, the segment from Chorzów to Bydgoszcz is part of PKP line 131 which diverges from Bydgoszcz towards Tczew.

PKP line 131

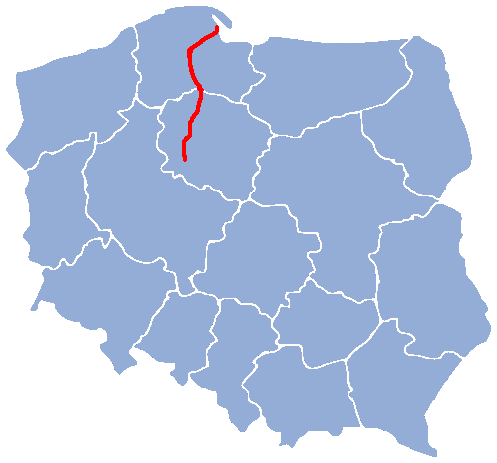
PKP line 201

== Investor ==
The Coal Trunk-Line was constructed by order of the Polish Government by a private company, the French-Polish Rail Association (FPTK – Francusko-Polskie Towarzystwo Kolejowe). This company maintained the route Herby Nowe – Gdynia from 24 April 1931 until 1 September 1939. During that time, the line was not under the authority of the Polish State Railways (PKP), the FPTK directed it from its headquarters in Bydgoszcz. After the war, the whole line was nationalized.

== Main stations ==
The most important stations on the original route are Chorzów, Tarnowskie Góry, Kalety, Herby Nowe, Chorzew Siemkowice, Zduńska Wola Karsznice, Inowrocław, Bydgoszcz, Wierzchucin, Kościerzyna, Somonino and Gdynia.

== Distances ==
The length of the line is measured from the junction at Herby Nowe to the port of Gdynia (i.e. from south to north). Not included is the Chorzów Batory – Herby Nowe connection (65 km).

MP (km)	Station
0	Herby Nowe
55	Chorzew Siemkowice
99	Zduńska Wola Karsznice
247	Inowrocław Rabinek
254	Inowrocław Glowny
299	Bydgoszcz Glowna
347	Wierzchucin
392	Bąk
413	Kościerzyna
438	Somonino
480	Gdynia Glowna

== Timeline ==
Dates of the route construction:

Segment	Year
Czersk – Bak – Kościerzyna	1928
Herby Nowe – Zduńska Wola	1930
Maksymilianowo – Bąk	1930
Kościerzyna – Gdynia	1930
Zduńska Wola – Inowrocław	1933

The total length of the connection constructed between 1930 and 1933: 448 km.
