= Arriva RP =

Polish private rail carrier

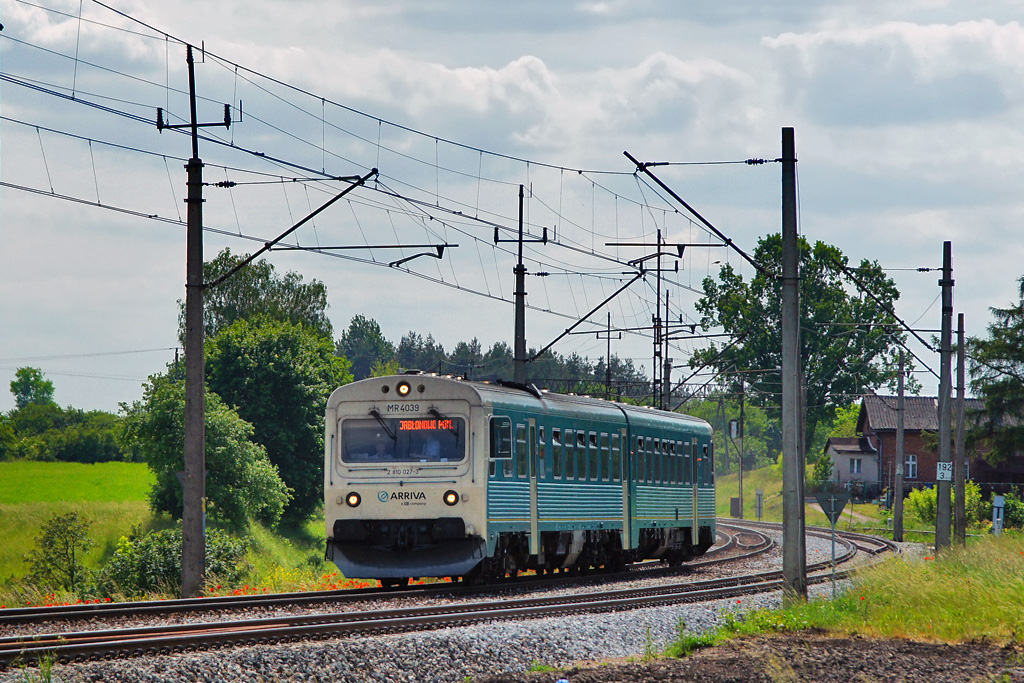
- MR/MRD of Arriva RP
- Formerly: Arriva PCC
- Company type: Spółka z ograniczoną odpowiedzialnością
- Industry: Public transport
- Founded: 12 October 2007
- Founder: Arriva; PCC Rail
- Parent: Arriva
- Website: arriva.pl

Arriva Poland Sp. z o. o. is a Polish private rail carrier providing services in the Kuyavian-Pomeranian, Masovian, Pomeranian and Warmian-Masurian voivodeships. It is a subsidiary of the British transport specialist Arriva.

It was established as Arriva PCC during 1996 as a 50/50 joint venture between Arriva and the private Polish rail freight operator PCC Rail. During December 2007, Arriva PCC commenced its first contract, operating all non-electrified passenger services in the Kuyavian-Pomeranian Voivodeship. Following PCC Rail's acquisition by the German state railway company Deutsche Bahn in June 2009, Arriva became the sole owner of the company and accordingly rebranded it as Arriva RP.

The company has pursued multiple strategies to expansion. Throughout the 2010s, Arriva RP was awarded a multiple extensions of its operations in Kuyavian-Pomeranian Voivodeship, expanding to cover electrified services as well; furthermore, it also secured several open access paths within Poland. During October 2022, Arriva RP signed a new contract, valued at €157.5 million per year, to provide services in the Kuyavian-Pomeranian Voivodeship region through to 2030. Additional services have been seasonally run to serve the travelling needs of tourists during the holiday season.

== History ==
The company was founded in 2006 as Arriva PCC; it was initially structured as a 50/50 joint venture between the British public transport specialist Arriva and the private Polish rail freight operator PCC Rail. At the time, Arriva was actively pursuing expansion in the mainland European rail sector. Simultaneously, Poland's railways were undergoing a lengthy restructuring in pursuit of a liberalised operational model, permissive of private operators and external participants, these reforms were largely similar to those being implemented across most of the member nations of the European Union (EU) at this time.

During December 2007, Arriva PCC commenced a contract to operate all passenger services ran on non-electrified lines in the Kuyavian-Pomeranian Voivodeship. The occasion was the company's first contract in the country, making Poland the tenth country in which Arriva operates transport services.

In June 2009, PCC Rail's share was included in its sale to the German state railway company Deutsche Bahn. During June 2010, Arriva purchased Deutsche Bahn's shareholding, after which the business was rebranded as Arriva RP. During the following year, Arriva was acquired by Deutsche Bahn, making it a wholly owned subsidiary.

During December 2010, Arriva RP was awarded a ten year extension to its Kuyavian-Pomeranian Voivodeship contract. In July 2013, it was announced that Arriva RP had been awarded a €22 million to expand its operations in the Kuyavian-Pomeranian Voivodeship region. In December 2013, the company commenced the new arrangement, which was to run for an initial period of two years, using 12 existing trains to serve roughly 50 railway stations across four different electrified lines. This was operated as a public/private partnership between Arriva RP and the local government, reportedly the first such arrangement in Poland, and was competitively tendered as a means of opening up the Polish passenger rail transport market to competition.

In September 2017, it was announced that Arriva RP had secured several open access paths in Poland. Multiple other applications by the company around this time were declined by the Polish rail regulator however. During October 2022, Arriva RP signed a new contract, valued at €157.5 million per year, covering the extension of its operations in the Kuyavian-Pomeranian Voivodeship region for a further eight years, up until 2030.

In early 2023, reports alleged that parent company Deutsche Bahn was considering options for spinning out Arriva to concentrate on its core German rail operations. Across the following months, various portions of Arriva's operations have been sold to other companies, including within the Polish market, but ownership of Arriva RP has been retained as of August 2023.

== Services ==
Arrive RP provides a regional passenger service in the Kuyavian-Pomeranian Voivodeship. Since December 2007, Arriva RP has run three main routes within the province, supplemented by a number of minor services. From 2009, to support the passenger traffic of the railway line No 207, Arriva RP began to run weekend trains between Bydgoszcz and Gdańsk. The holiday season also allows for seasonal connections to tourist destinations and seaside resorts in Pomerania and Warmia.

=== Routes operated ===
- AR410 Toruń Główny– Lipno – Sierpc
- AR415 Toruń Główny – Chełmża – Grudziądz
- AR416 Chełmża - Unisław Pomorski - Bydgoszcz Główna
- AR429 Laskowice Pomorskie / Wierzchucin - Szlachta - Czersk
- AR431A Bydgoszcz Główna - Wierzchucin - Tuchola - Chojnice
- AR431B Bydgoszcz Główna - Laskowice Pomorskie - Grudziądz -Jabłonowo Pomorskie – Brodnica
- AR440 Bydgoszcz Główna - Wierzchucin - Szlachta -Czersk

== Rolling stock ==
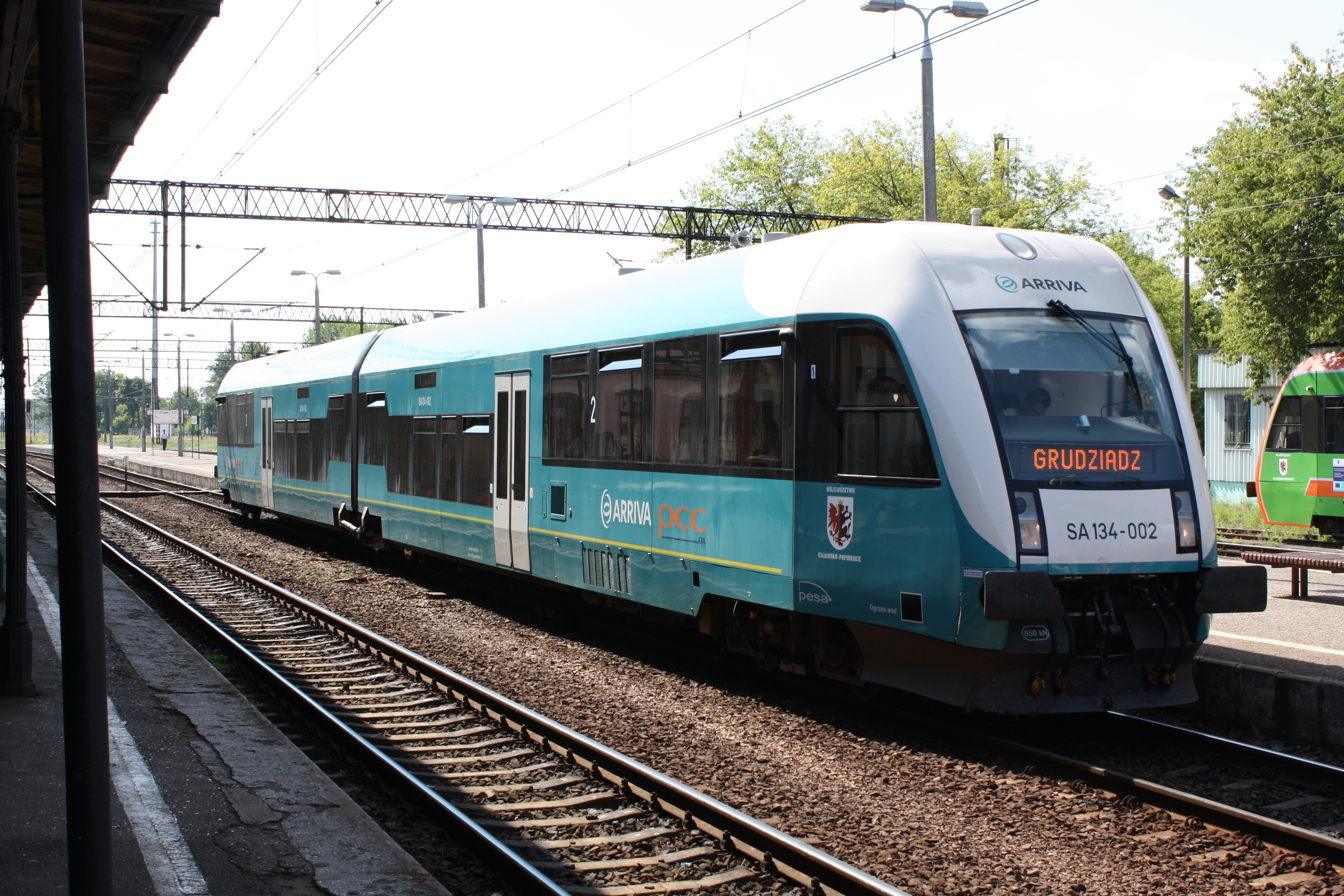
SA134

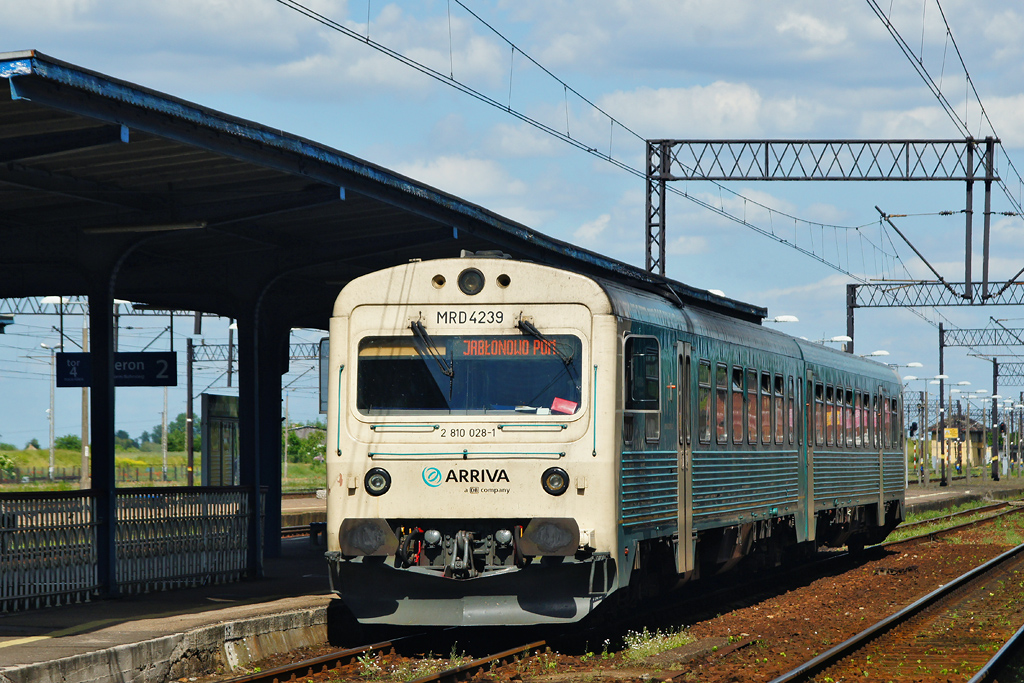
MR/MRD

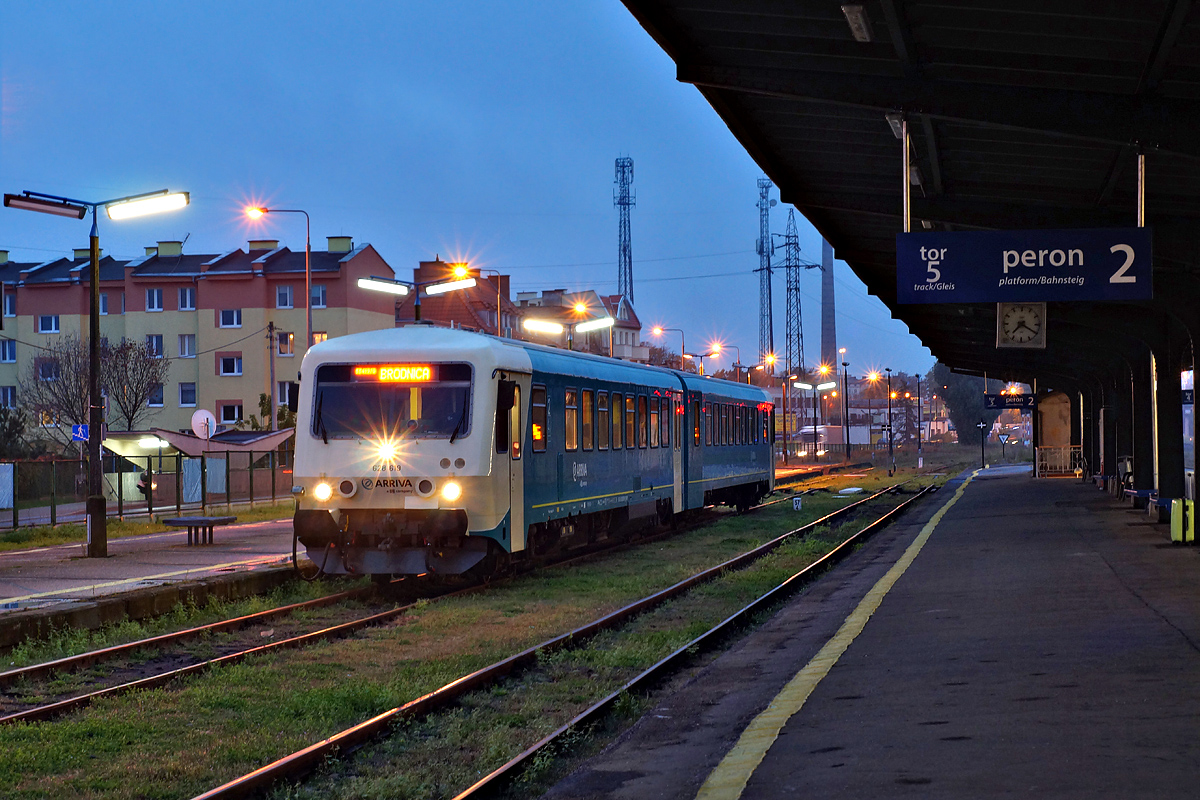
VT628

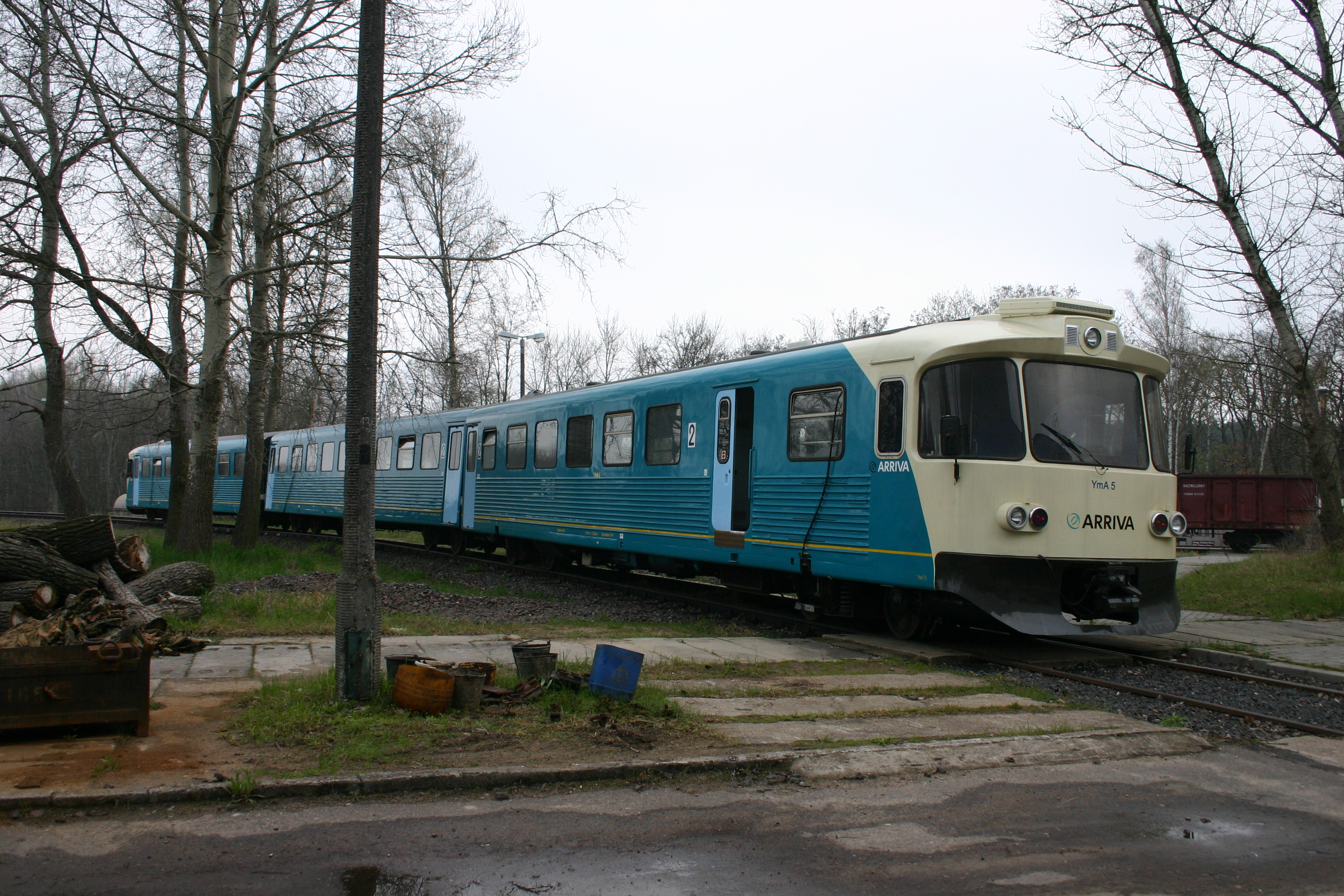
Y

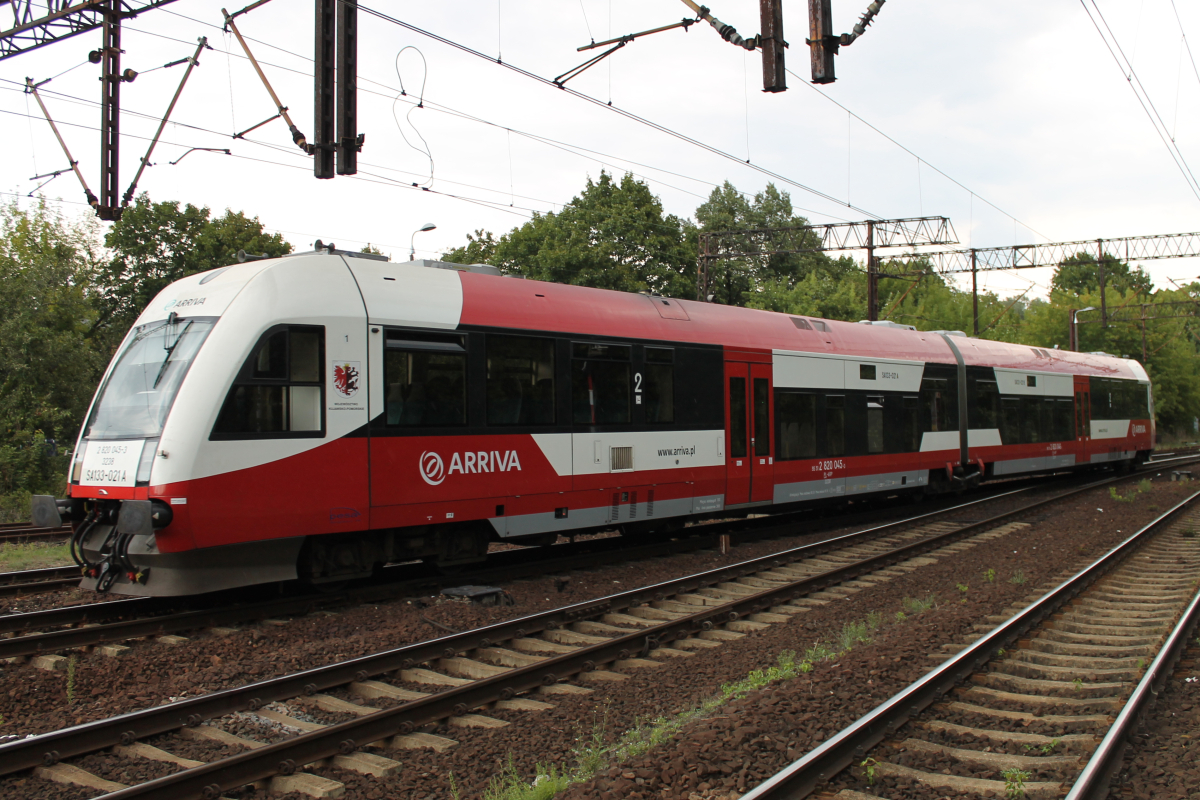
SA133

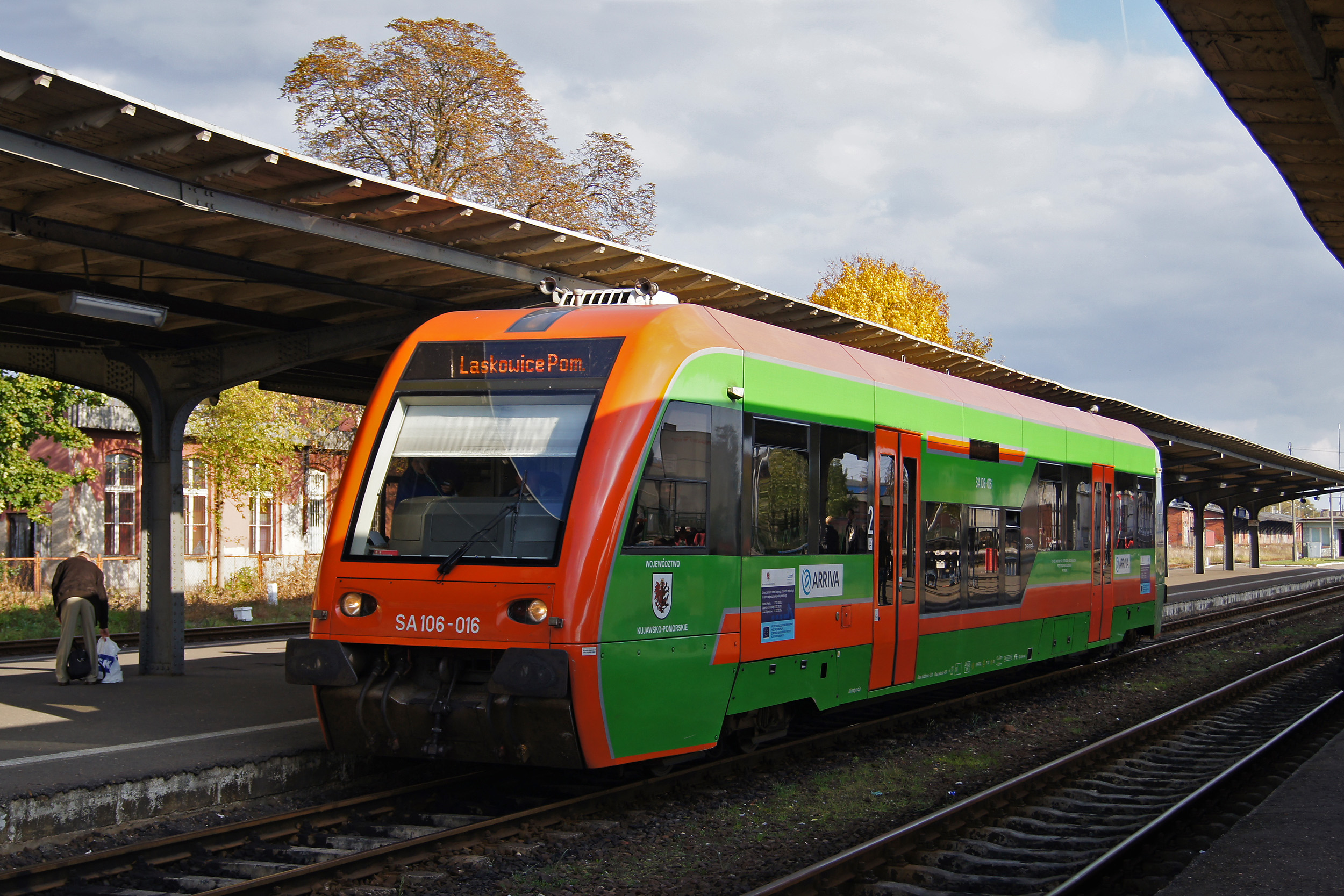
SA106

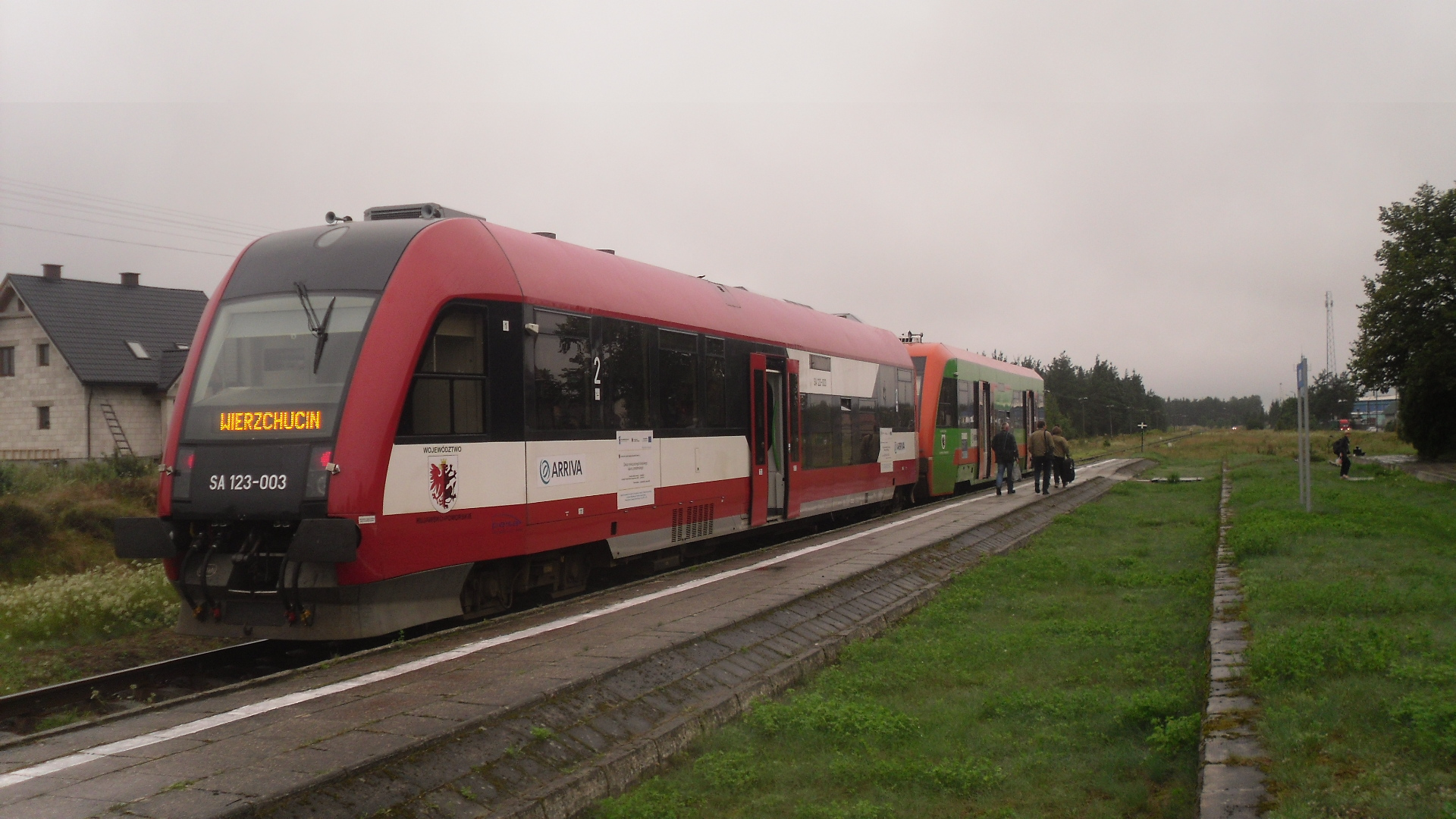
SA123

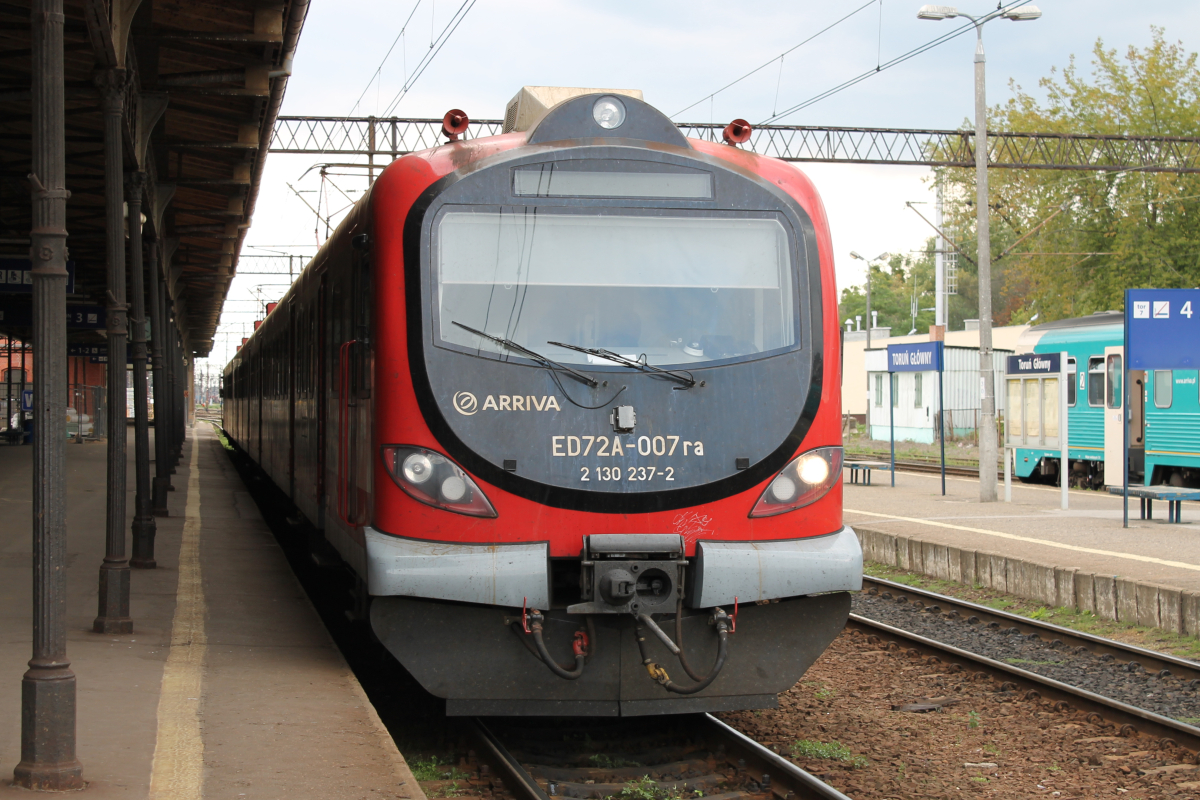
ED72A
