= Toruń Główny railway station =

Main railway station of Toruń, Poland

Toruń Główny
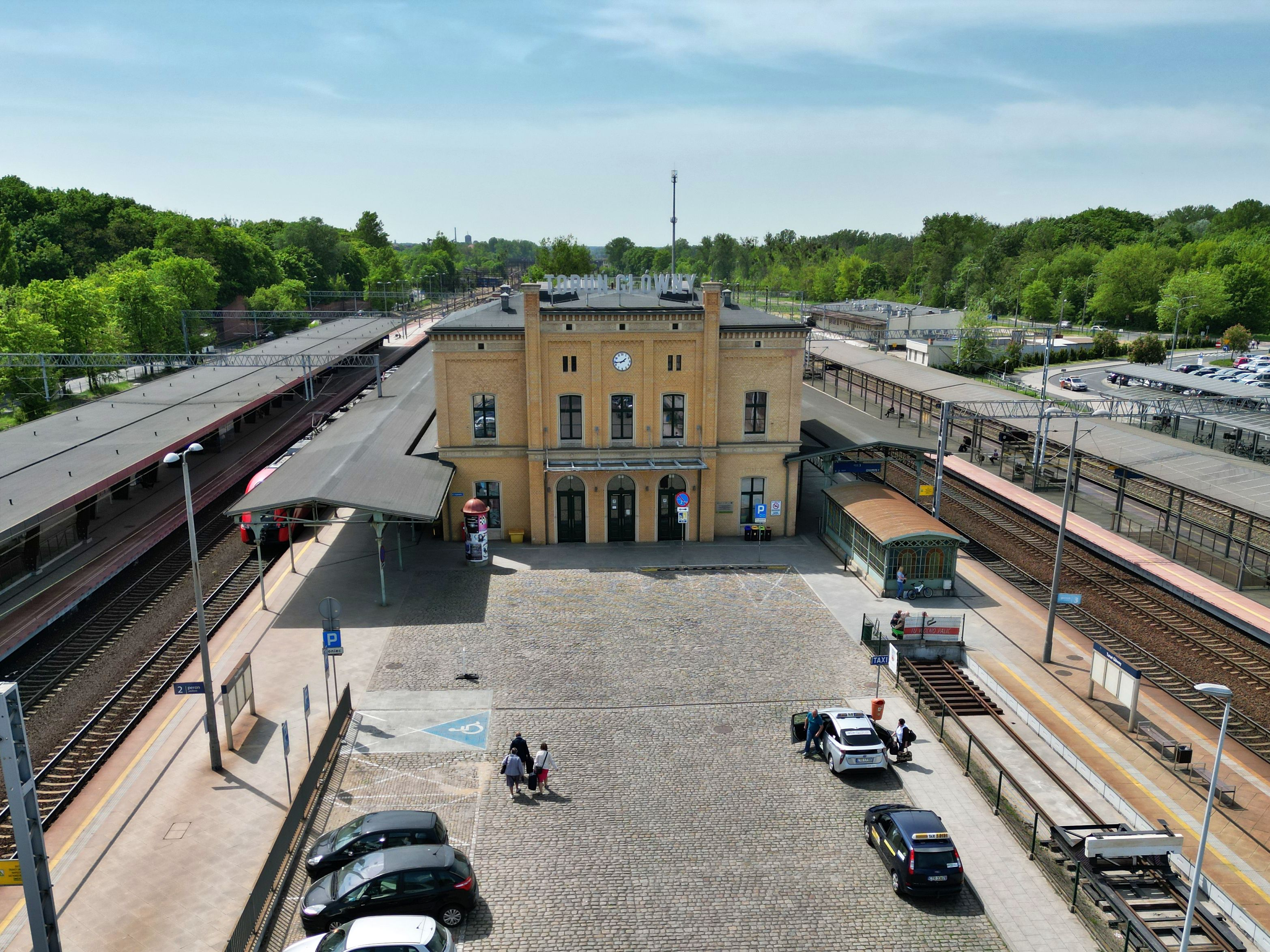
- Station building

General information
- Location: Kujawska 1, Toruń, Kuyavian–Pomeranian Voivodeship; Poland
- Coordinates: 53°0′0″N 18°36′51″E
- Operator: PKP Polskie Linie Kolejowe
- Lines: Poznań–Skandawa railway; Kutno–Piła railway
- Platforms: 6

History
- Opened: 1861; 165 years ago
- Rebuilt: 2014-2015
- Former names: Thorn; Toruń Przedmieście
Location
- Location within Poland Location within Kuyavian-Pomeranian Voivodeship

Toruń Główny (lit. 'Toruń Main') is the main railway station of the city of Toruń, in the Kuyavian–Pomeranian Voivodeship, Poland. The station is located on the Poznań–Skandawa railway and Kutno–Piła railway. Train services are operated by PKP Intercity, Polregio and Arriva RP.

Since 14 October 2014, Toruń Główny has the highest category A (annual number of passengers over 2 million people).

== History ==
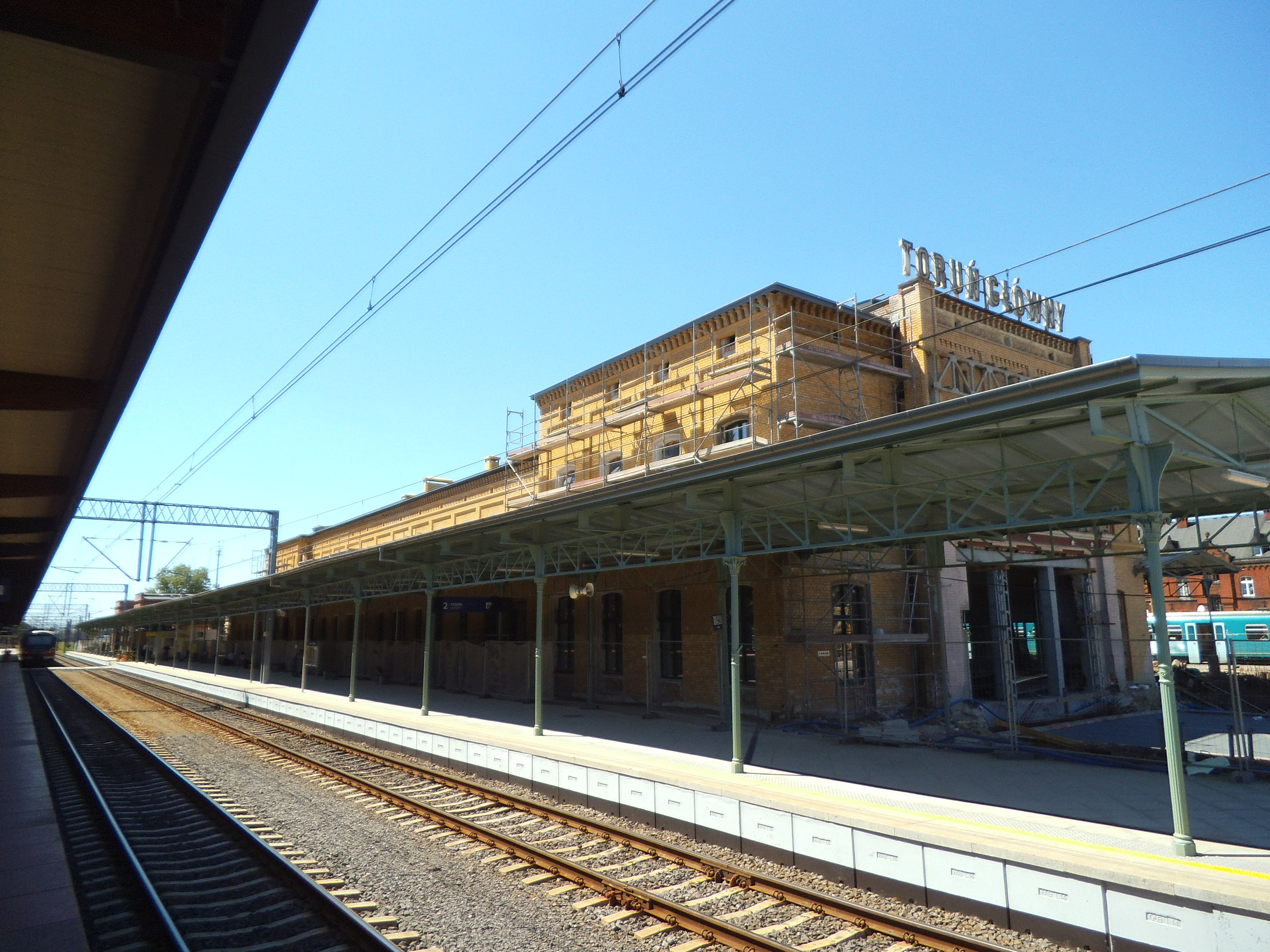
View of the platforms at the station during modernisation.

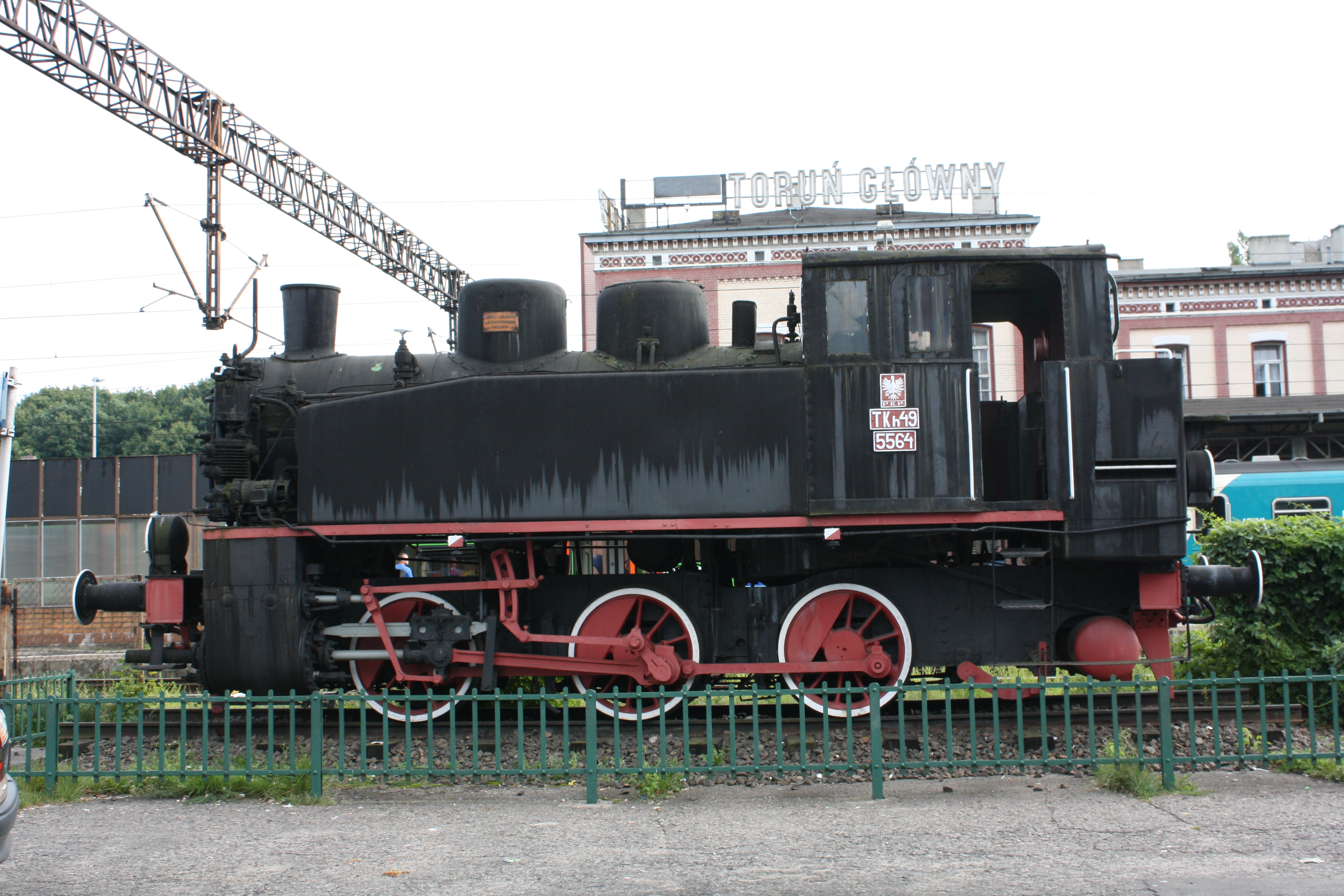
Steam train TKh49-5564 plinthed at the station.

The station was opened in 1861, but the current building was built in 1874. In the past, Toruń Główny was named Toruń Przedmieście.

== Modernisation ==
Renovation of the railway station began in April 2014 and lasted until November 2015. The following aspects were modernised and rebuilt:

- The main station building - renovated the façade of removing old paint and the unveiling of the historic brick (to restore to the original condition), roofing, windows and interior of the building. The entire station building has gained representative character.
- Platforms - all four platforms of the station were modernized and rebuilt. The platforms are equipped with shelters for travellers and electronic information boards.
- Tunnel - existing underpass was rebuilt and extended, and also was added the missing part leading to the street behind the station. In the basement the station will accommodate small shops and services.
- The station square - the square outside the station created a "park & ride" and also the renovated bus station
- Post building - this was used from October 2014 as a temporary station. After completion of the entire project, the building will be transformed into a hotel with 60 seats and a conference hall.

This project was developed within the project "Integration of the urban transport system with the purchase of the tram in Torun - BiT - City". The project was almost 80% co-financed by the European Union. The investment cost of more than 43.5 million zł; the value of the grant 25.6 million zł.

== Train services ==
The station is served by the following services:

- Intercity services Gdynia - Gdansk - Bydgoszcz - Torun - Kutno - Lowicz - Warsaw - Lublin - Rzeszow - Zagorz/Przemysl
- Intercity services Gdynia - Gdansk - Bydgoszcz - Torun - Kutno - Lodz - Czestochowa - Katowice - Bielsko-Biala
- Intercity services Gdynia - Gdansk - Bydgoszcz - Torun - Kutno - Lodz - Czestochowa - Krakow - Zakopane
- Intercity services Kolobrzeg - Pila - Bydgoszcz - Torun - Kutno - Lowicz - Warsaw
- Intercity services Szczecin - Pila - Bydgoszcz - Torun - Kutno - Lowicz - Warsaw - Lublin - Rzeszow - Przemysl
- Intercity services Gorzow Wielkopolskie - Krzyz - Pila - Bydgoszcz - Torun - Kutno - Lowicz - Warsaw
- Intercity services Wroclaw / Zielona Gora - Poznan - Torun - Ilawa - Olsztyn - Elk - Bialystok
- Regional services (R) Bydgoszcz - Solec Kujawski - Torun
- Regional services (R) Bydgoszcz - Solec Kujawski - Torun - Wloclawek - Kutno
- Regional services (R) Poznan - Gniezno - Mogilno - Inowroclaw - Torun
- Regional services (R) Torun - Jablonowo Pomorskie - Ilawa - Olsztyn
- Regional services (AR) Torun - Chelmza - Grudziadz
- Regional services (AR) Torun - Sierpc

Preceding station	PKP Intercity	Following station
Inowrocław towards Bohumín	TLK	Toruń Wschodni towards Łeba or Hel
Solec Kujawski towards Bydgoszcz Główna	IC	Aleksandrów Kujawski towards Rzeszów Główny
Solec Kujawski towards Bydgoszcz Główna	IC	Toruń Miasto towards Warszawa Zachodnia
Solec Kujawski towards Bydgoszcz Główna	IC	Aleksandrów Kujawski towards Kraków Główny
Solec Kujawski towards Bydgoszcz Główna	IC	Aleksandrów Kujawski towards Chełm
Solec Kujawski towards Bydgoszcz Główna	IC	Aleksandrów Kujawski towards Warszawa Gdańska or Warszawa Wschodnia
Solec Kujawski towards Piła Główna	IC	Aleksandrów Kujawski towards Warszawa Gdańska or Warszawa Wschodnia
Solec Kujawski towards Gdynia Główna	TLK	Aleksandrów Kujawski towards Katowice
Solec Kujawski towards Gdynia Główna	IC	Aleksandrów Kujawski towards Łódź Fabryczna
Inowrocław towards Wrocław Główny	IC	Toruń Miasto towards Olsztyn Główny
Inowrocław towards Poznań Główny	IC	Toruń Miasto towards Olsztyn Główny
Preceding station	Polregio	Following station
Toruń Kluczyki towards Bydgoszcz Główna	PR	Toruń Miasto towards Toruń Wschodni
Toruń Kluczyki towards Bydgoszcz Główna	PR	Toruń Czerniewice towards Kutno
Toruń Kluczyki towards Poznań Główny	PR	Terminus
Terminus	PR	Toruń Miasto towards Olsztyn Główny
Preceding station	Arriva RP	Following station
Terminus	AR410	Toruń Miasto towards Sierpc
Terminus	AR415	Toruń Miasto towards Grudziądz

== Preserved locomotives ==
- Steam engine TKh49-5564 is plinthed outside the north entrance to the station.
