= Aleksandrów Kujawski railway station =

Railway station in Aleksandrów Kujawski, Poland

Aleksandrów Kujawski
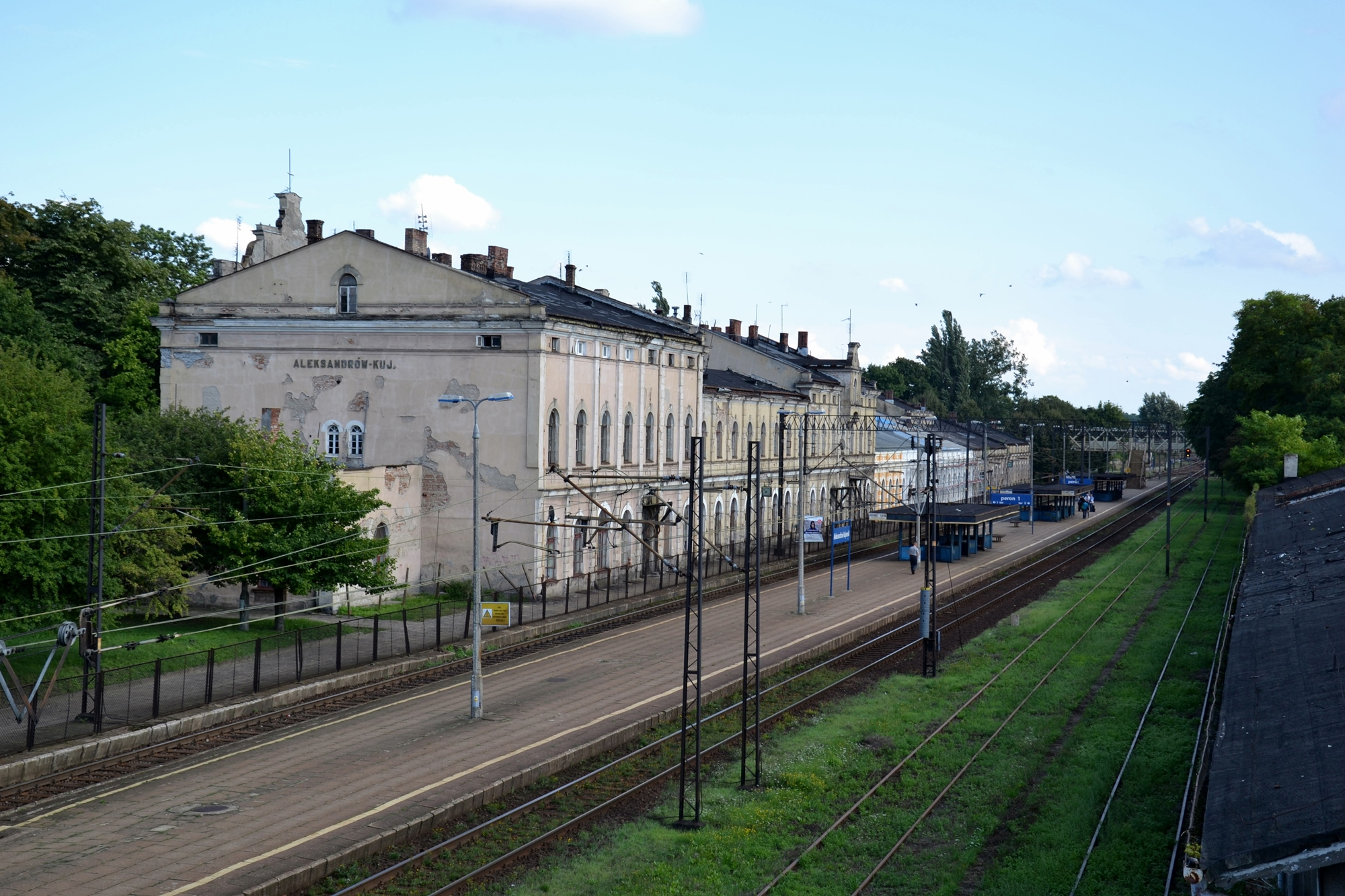
- Aleksandrów Kujawski railway station

General information
- Location: Aleksandrów Kujawski, Kuyavian-Pomeranian Voivodeship; Poland
- System: Railway Station
- Operator: PKP; Polregio
- Lines: 18: Kutno–Piła railway 245: Aleksandrów Kujawski–Ciechocinek railway
- Platforms: 2
- Tracks: 4

History
- Opened: 1862; 164 years ago
- Former names: Białe Błota Aleksandrów Pograniczny
Location
- Location within Poland

Aleksandrów Kujawski railway station is a railway station serving the town of Aleksandrów Kujawski, in the Kuyavian-Pomeranian Voivodeship, Poland. The station is located on the Kutno–Piła railway and Aleksandrów Kujawski–Ciechocinek railway. The train services are operated by PKP and Polregio. The railway station opened in 1862

== Train services ==
The station is served by the following services:

- Intercity services Gdynia - Gdansk - Bydgoszcz - Torun - Kutno - Lowicz - Warsaw - Lublin - Rzeszow - Zagorz/Przemysl
- Intercity services Gdynia - Gdansk - Bydgoszcz - Torun - Kutno - Lodz - Czestochowa - Katowice - Bielsko-Biala
- Intercity services Gdynia - Gdansk - Bydgoszcz - Torun - Kutno - Lodz - Czestochowa - Krakow - Zakopane
- Intercity services Kolobrzeg - Pila - Bydgoszcz - Torun - Kutno - Lowicz - Warsaw
- Intercity services Szczecin - Pila - Bydgoszcz - Torun - Kutno - Lowicz - Warsaw - Lublin - Rzeszow - Przemysl
- Intercity services Gorzow Wielkopolskie - Krzyz - Pila - Bydgoszcz - Torun - Kutno - Lowicz - Warsaw
- Regional services (R) Bydgoszcz - Solec Kujawski - Torun - Wloclawek - Kutno

Preceding station	Polregio	Following station
Otłoczyn towards Bydgoszcz Główna	PR	Turzno Kujawskie towards Kutno
