= Zduńska Wola Karsznice =

Coordinates: 51°35′22″N 18°59′40″E

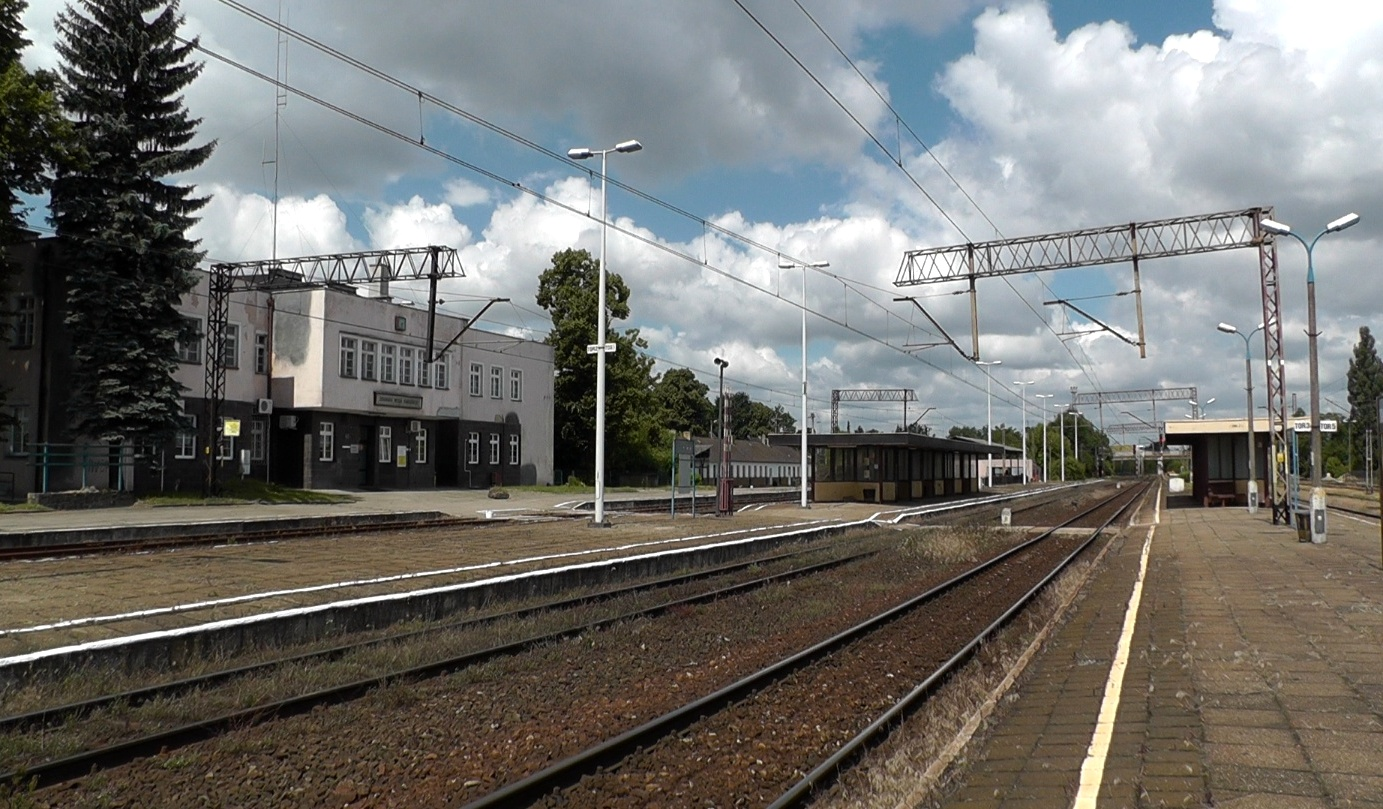

Zduńska Wola Karsznice is one of the biggest rail junctions in Poland, located in central part of the country, within the borders of the town of Zduńska Wola (Łódź Voivodeship). It is a station along the Polish Coal Trunk-Line; before 1930 it had been a separate village, but construction of the Trunk-Line resulted in creation of a separate district for rail workers, with numerous condominiums. A few kilometers north of Karsznice, the Trunk-Line crosses the Łódź–Tuplice rail line linking Warsaw through Łódź and Ostrów Wielkopolski to Poznań and Wrocław.
