= Chorzew Siemkowice railway station =

Railway station in Pajęczno County, Poland

Coordinates: 51°12′38″N 18°56′28″E

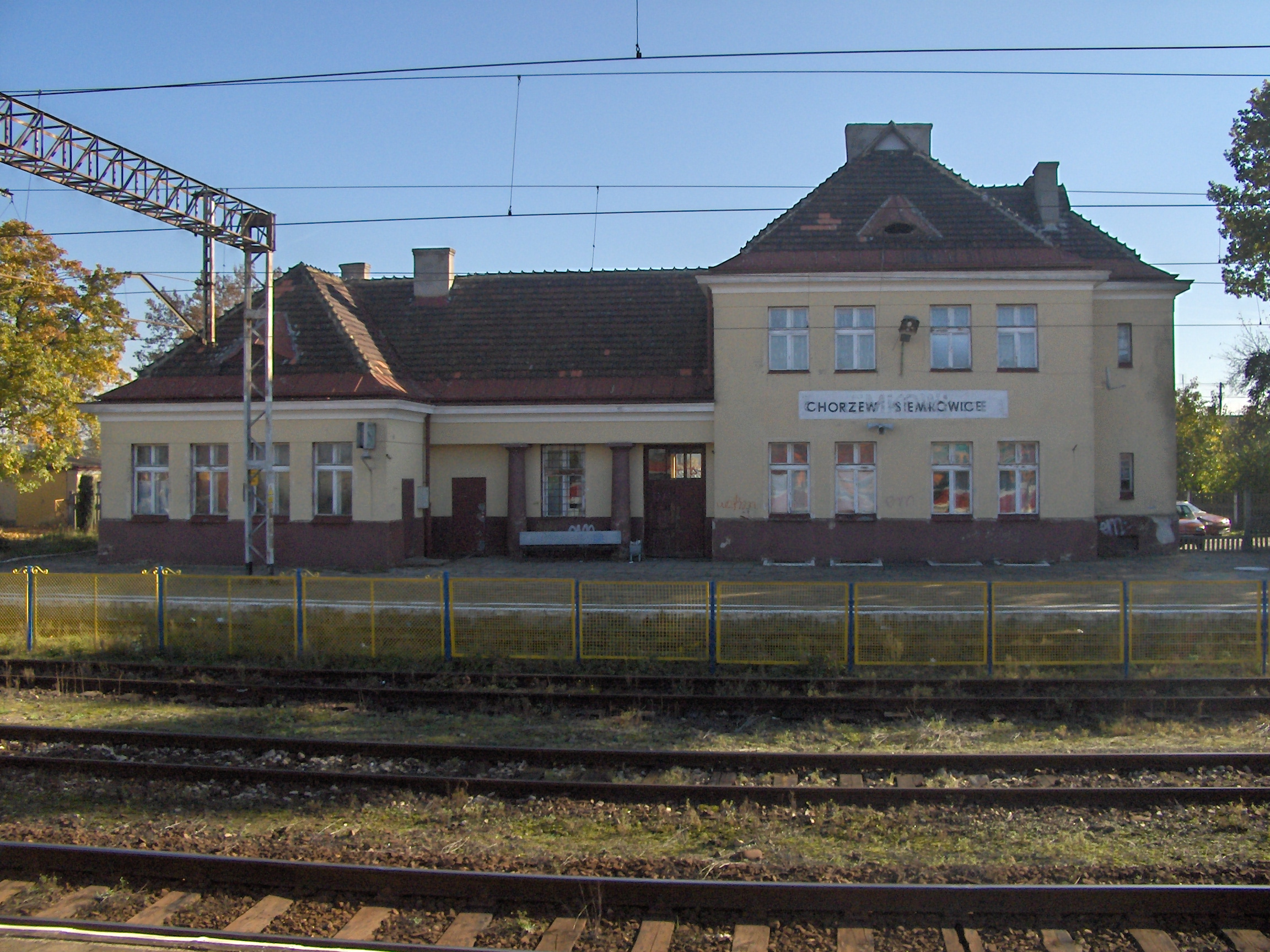
Station building

Chorzew Siemkowice is a Polish rail junction located in the Pajęczno County of the Łódź Voivodeship, in the central part of Poland. It is located on the route of the Polish Coal Trunk-Line, and also is the terminal station of the Częstochowa - Chorzew Siemkowice line. It is named for two nearby villages located near the station, Chorzew and Siemkowice.

== History ==
The station opened in 1933 as part of the Coal Trunk Line. The Częstochowa - Chorzew Siemkowice line was built shortly after in 1939. Initially, it was an important station in the region. Rail service was suspended from 9 December 2012. The station infrastructure was demolished in 2019.

Train services are planned to be resumed to the station in December 2024, where trains will travel on line 146 bound for Częstochowa. The passenger infrastructure will be rebuilt at a total cost of 25 million PLN, with construction targeted to complete by the first quarter of 2025.
