= ASF Autolinee =

Italian bus company based in Como

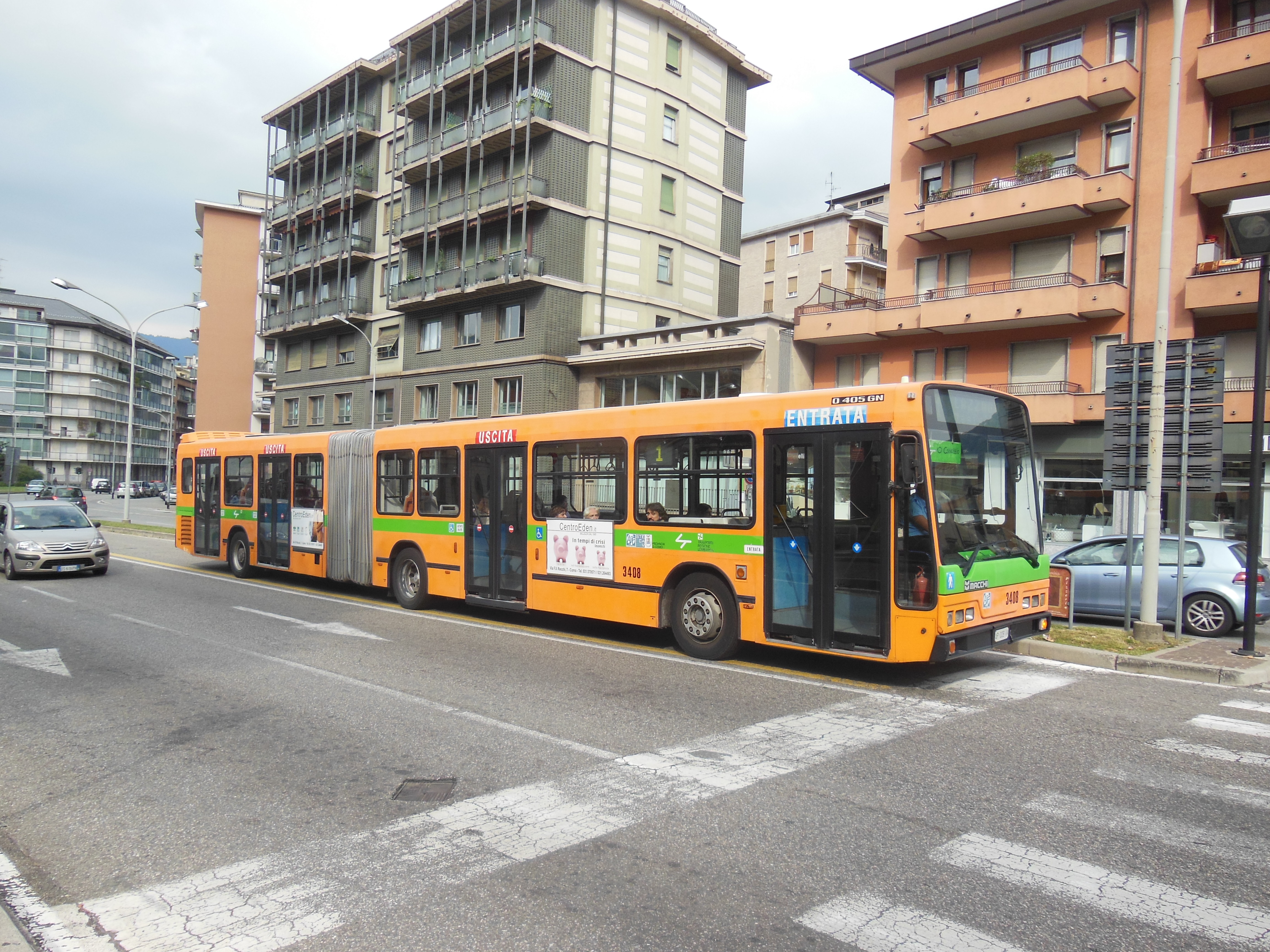
An ASF Autolinee city bus in the city of Como.

ASF Autolinee is an Italian bus company that provides bus services in the city of Como, the surrounding province of Como, and in Lecco. The company also operates two bus routes into Switzerland, one from Como to Chiasso and the other from Menaggio to Lugano.

The company is part-owned by the city of Como, the province of Como and the province of Lecco, who between them own 51% of the company. The remaining 49% is owned by a joint venture between Ferrovie Nord Milano and Arriva.

== Services ==
=== Urban Bus Routes ===
1 Chiasso (CH) – Ponte Chiasso – Como – San Fermo – Ospedale Sant'Anna
3 Lipomo – Camerlata – Grandate (scholastic)
4 Cimitero – Stazione San Giovanni – Campora
5 Stazione San Giovanni – Civiglio
6 Masliago – Breccia
7 Sagnino – Lora
8 Stazione San Giovanni – Casnate
11 Ponte Chiasso – Sagnino-Bassone
12 Camerlata-Lazzago – Ospedale Sant'Anna – San Fermo-Tavernola (scholastic)
T3 Brunate – Faro Voltiano – CAO

=== Interurban Bus Routes ===
C10 Como – Menaggio – Colico
C12 Menaggio – Porlezza – Lugano (CH)
C13 Menaggio – Plesio
C14 Menaggio – Porlezza – Cavargna
C17 Dongo – Garzeno
C19 Pianello – Morbegno – Sondrio/Chiavenna (scholastic)
C20 Como – Argegno – Lanzo
C21 Argegno – San Fedele – Casasco
C22 San Fedele – Porlezza
C23 San Fedele – Ponna
C24 San Fedele – Pigra
C26 Lucino – Como – Campione d'Italia (scholastic)
C27 Porlezza – Val Rezzo (scholastic)
C28 Como – Rovenna
C29 Como – Tosnacco
C30 Como – Nesso – Bellagio
C31 Como – Torno – Palanzo
C32 Como – Nesso – Piano del Tivano
C35 Asso – Valbrona
C36 Asso – Civenna – Bellagio
C37 Asso – Sormano
C40 Como – Erba – Lecco
C43 Como – Lipomio – Tavernerio – Ponzate
C45 Como – Inverigo – Cantù
C46 Como – Merate – Bergamo
C47 Como – Casatenovo – Merate
C49 Como – Erba – Asso
C50 Como – Olmeda – Cantù
C52 Como – Intimiano – Cantù
C60 Como – Camerlata – Bregnano
C62 Como – Camerlata – Appiano Gentile – Mozzate
C70 Como – Villa Guardia – Appiano Gentile
C74 Como – Uggiate – Valmorea
C75 Como – Ronago – Uggiate
C80 Cantù – Mariano Comense – Meda – Seregno – Desio – Lissone – Monza
C81 Cantù – Mariano Comense – Perticato
C82 Cantù – Carimate (regular) / – Mariano Comense (scholastic)
C85 Cantù – Fino Mornasco
C86 Cantù – Brenna – Anzano – Erba
C90 Erba – Mariaga
C91 Erba – Cremenago
C92 Erba – Orsenigo – Erba
C94 Erba – Caslino d'Erba – Erba
C95 Erba – Bosisio Parini
C99 Erba circular route
U1 Cantù urban route 1
U2 Cantù urban route 2
U3 Cantù urban route 3
