= Wardle Transport =

British bus operating company

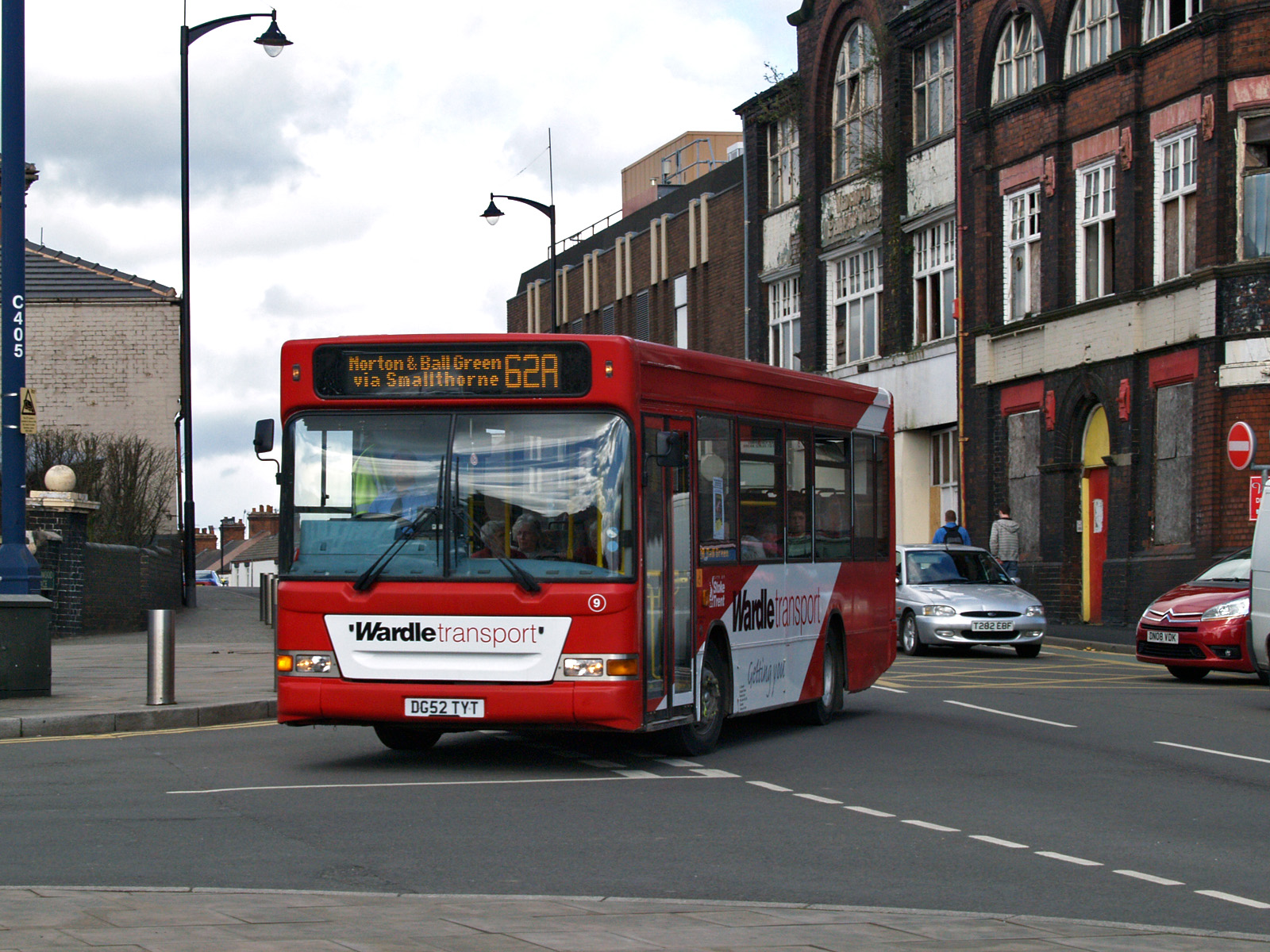
- Plaxton Pointer 2 bodied Dennis Dart SLF in Burslem in April 2009
- Founded: 1963
- Defunct: 8 May 2015 (sold to D&G Bus)
- Headquarters: Stoke-on-Trent
- Service area: Derbyshire; Staffordshire
- Service type: Bus services
- Routes: 39 (October 2013)
- Fleet: 64 (December 2010)
- Website: www.wardletransport.com

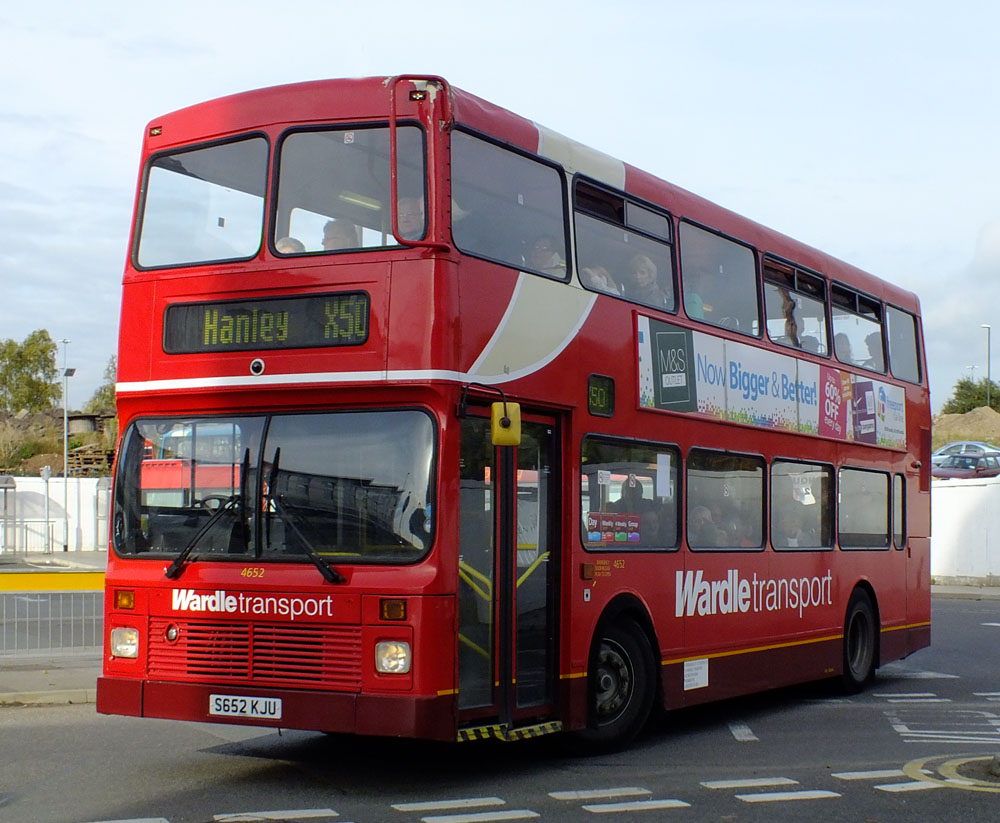
Northern Counties Palatine bodied Volvo Olympian in October 2012

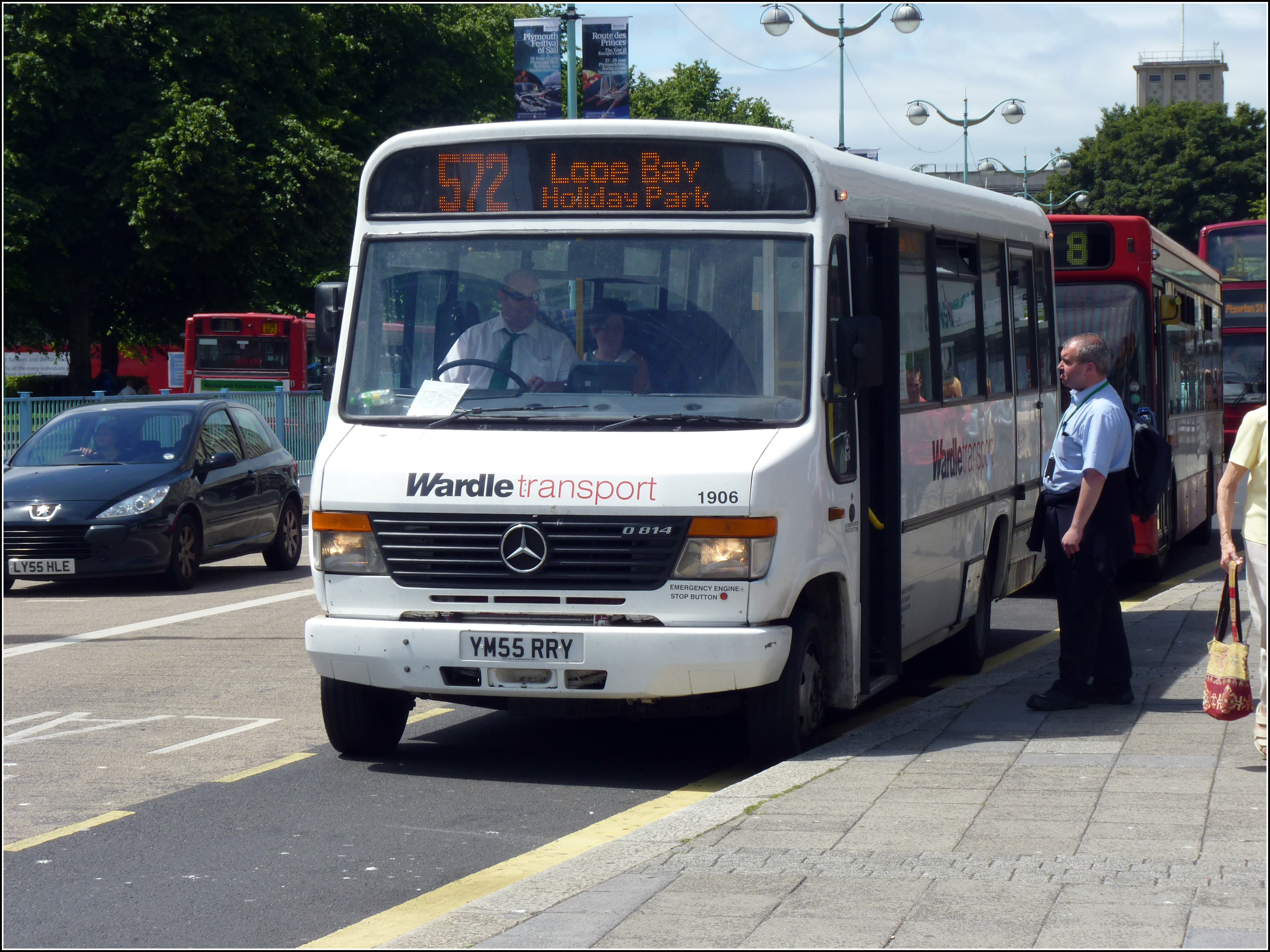
Plaxton Beaver 2 bodied Mercedes-Benz Vario O814D in June 2013

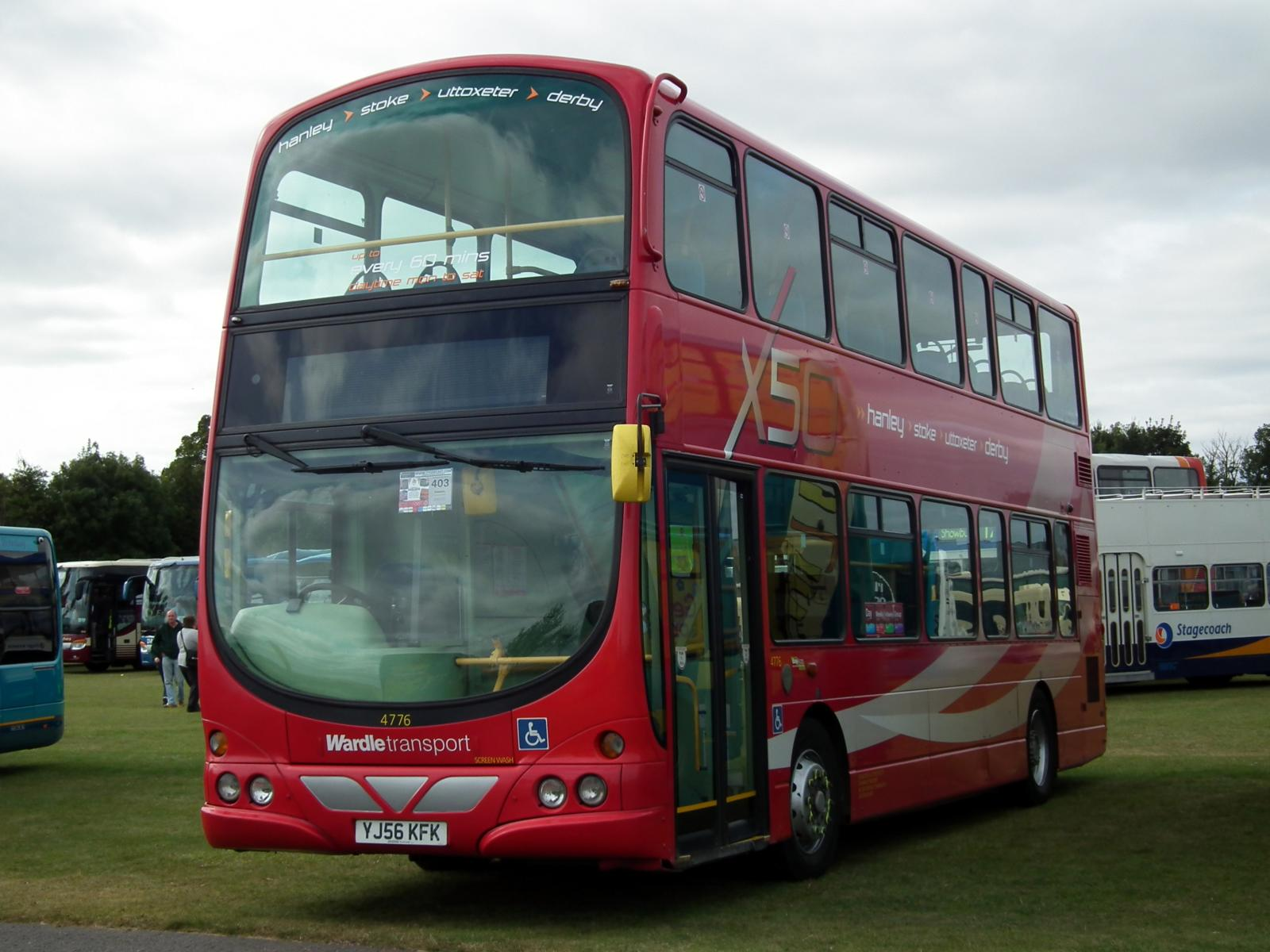
X50 branded Wright Pulsar Gemini bodied VDL DB250 in September 2012

Wardle Transport was a bus operator based in Stoke-on-Trent, Staffordshire, England. Formed in 1963 as Jack's of Norton, it expanded from 2001 to operate a network of local bus routes using over 60 vehicles. Arriva purchased the company in December 2010 and placed under the control of its Arriva Midlands subsidiary. Arriva stated that Wardle's identity would be retained. At the time of the takeover, Wardle employed 105 staff and operated a fleet of 64 buses and ran 18 scheduled services. A new livery of two-tone red and white applied in Arriva's corporate style was introduced in June 2011.

In 2015, Arriva announced that D&G Bus had purchased the operations of Wardle Transport with them taking over from 9 May 2015.

== History ==
Wardle Transport was founded in 1963 by Doug Wardle. It initially traded as Jack's of Norton, and was run alongside travel agent Wardle Travel. For its first 38 years of existence, the company operated a small fleet of minibuses on school services. In 2002 contracts to operate two routes in Stoke-on-Trent were won; these were operated with three Optare Alero minibuses hired from Stoke-on-Trent City Council. One of these routes was withdrawn in 2004. Following First Potteries maximum allowable vehicles being cut, Wardle gained three school services, acquiring its first double-decker vehicles to operate the routes.

A new route linking Hanley, Haywood Hospital and Burslem was launched in early 2006. The route, supported by the city council, replaced a route withdrawn by another operator, but was initially found not to be commercially viable.

In 2007, the company won a contract to operate services to Stoke City Football Club home matches, initially using four double-deck buses. The services proved popular and the following season saw eight buses used. Four new commercial routes were also introduced in 2008.

A new direct service linking Blurton to Hanley, branded as Plumline, was introduced in 2008. An Optare Versa single-decker was bought for use on the route.

In August 2011 Arriva Midlands purchased the Staffordshire routes of D&G Bus with 46 routes and 30 buses and these were integrated into Wardle Transport.

In April 2012, Wardle Transport commenced operating route X50 to Derby.

== Services ==
As of October 2013 Wardle Transport operated 39 bus routes.
