= Arriva =

Multinational public transport company

Arriva Ltd.
- Type: Private company
- Traded as: Arriva
- Industry: Transport
- Founded: 24 October 1938; 87 years ago
- Founder: TSK Cowie
- Headquarters: Sunderland, England
- Area served: Europe
- Key people: Gianfranco Sgro (CEO)
- Services: Bus, ferry and rail services
- Revenue: €5.35 billion (December 2017)
- Operating income: €569 million (December 2017)
- Owner: I Squared Capital
- Number of employees: 35,500 (November 2023)
- Divisions: Arriva UK Bus; Arriva UK Trains; Continental Europe
- Subsidiaries: List of subsidiaries
- Website: arrivagroup.com

Arriva Ltd. is a British multinational public transport company headquartered in Sunderland, England.

The company was originally established on 24 October 1938 as T Cowie Ltd. Initially focused on the sale of motorcycles, it relaunched shortly after the Second World War by Tom Cowie. During December 1964, the company was floated, it acquired its first car dealership months later. In 1972, the company established Cowie Contract Hire, a successful contract hire business. T. Cowie entered into bus operations via the purchase of the London-based Grey-Green operator in 1980. During 1984, it acquired the Hanger Group along with the vehicle leasing business Interleasing. In April 1994, the company was renamed Cowie Group. Months later, Cowie Group acquired the Leaside Buses and South London Transport business units amid the wider privatisation of London bus services. During 1997, it also bought the Denmark-based operator Unibus, becoming its first venture based outside the United Kingdom.

During November 1997, the company was rebranded as Arriva. In the late 1990s and early 2000s, it disposed of its vehicle-hire and motor-retailing businesses. In February 2000, Arriva purchased MTL Holdings, which included its first UK rail franchises, Merseyrail Electrics and Northern Spirit. In April 2008, the LNWR train maintenance business was acquired. Arriva became a subsidiary of Deutsche Bahn in August 2010. Arriva operates bus, coach, train, tram and waterbus services in 10 countries across Europe. As of November 2023, it employed 35,500 people and operated 1.5 billion passenger journeys annually. It operates as three divisions: UK Bus, UK Rail and Mainland Europe. Deutsche Bahn announced in 2019 that it wished to sell Arriva, but such a sale was placed on hold as of November in that year. During the early 2020s, several of Arriva's continental European operations have been sold on. In October 2023, Deutsche Bahn agreed terms to sell Arriva to I Squared Capital with the transaction completed in June 2024.

== History ==
Previous Arriva logo used from 1997 to 2017. The "a DB company" byline was added in 2010

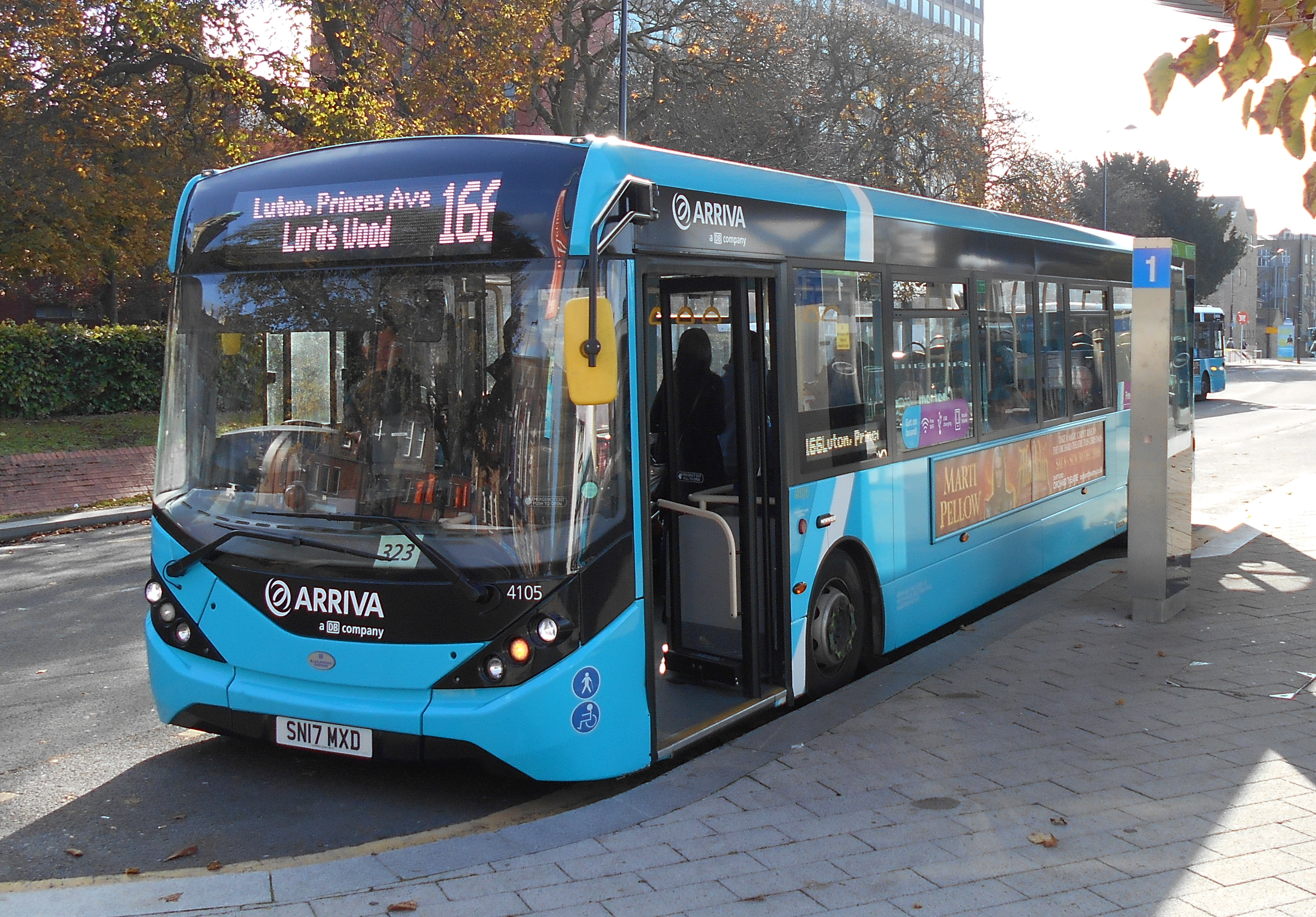
Arriva Kent and Surrey Alexander Dennis Enviro200 MMC in 2018 livery

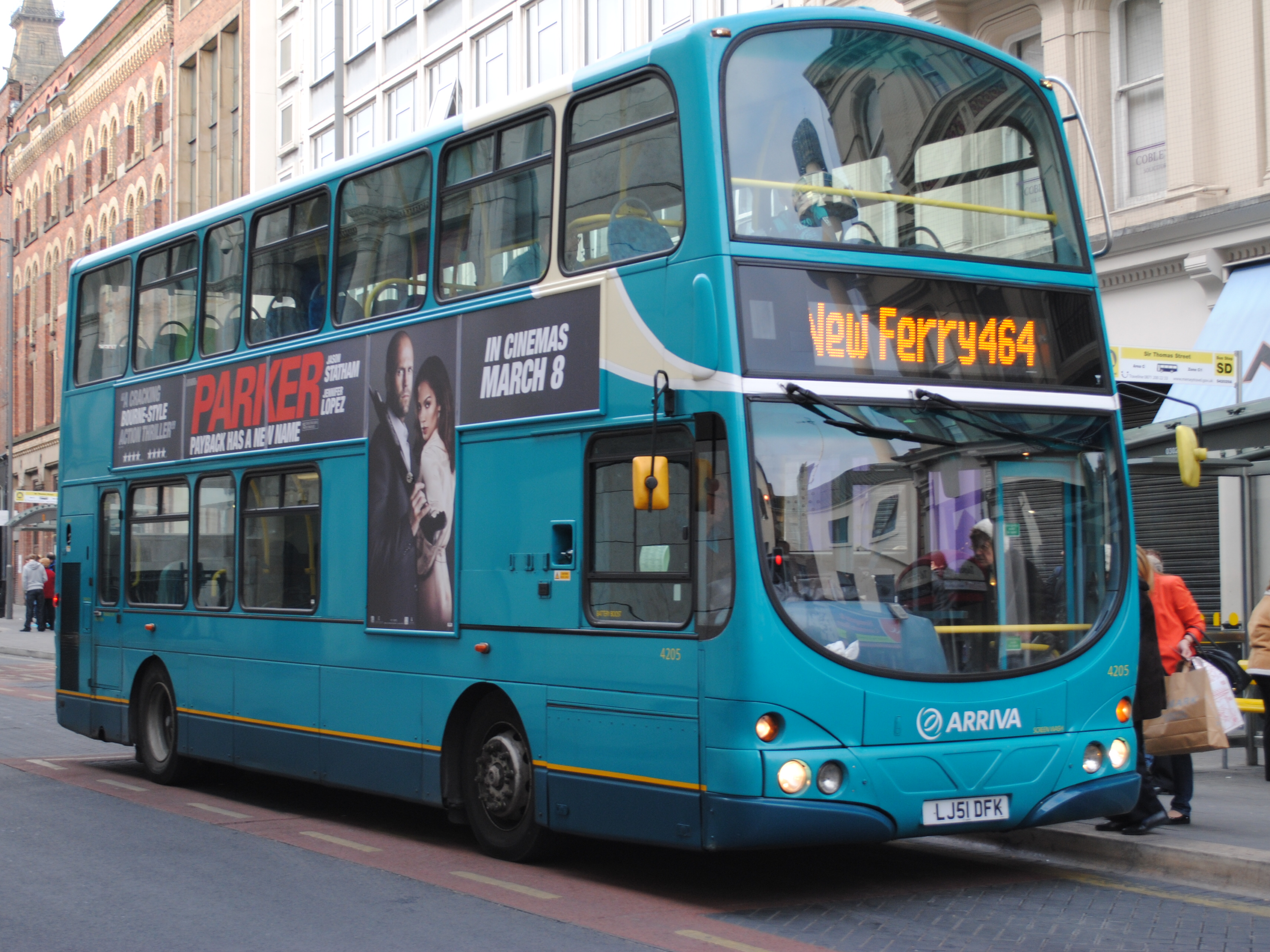
Arriva North West Wright Eclipse Gemini bodied Volvo B7TL in Liverpool in March 2013 in the Interurban livery

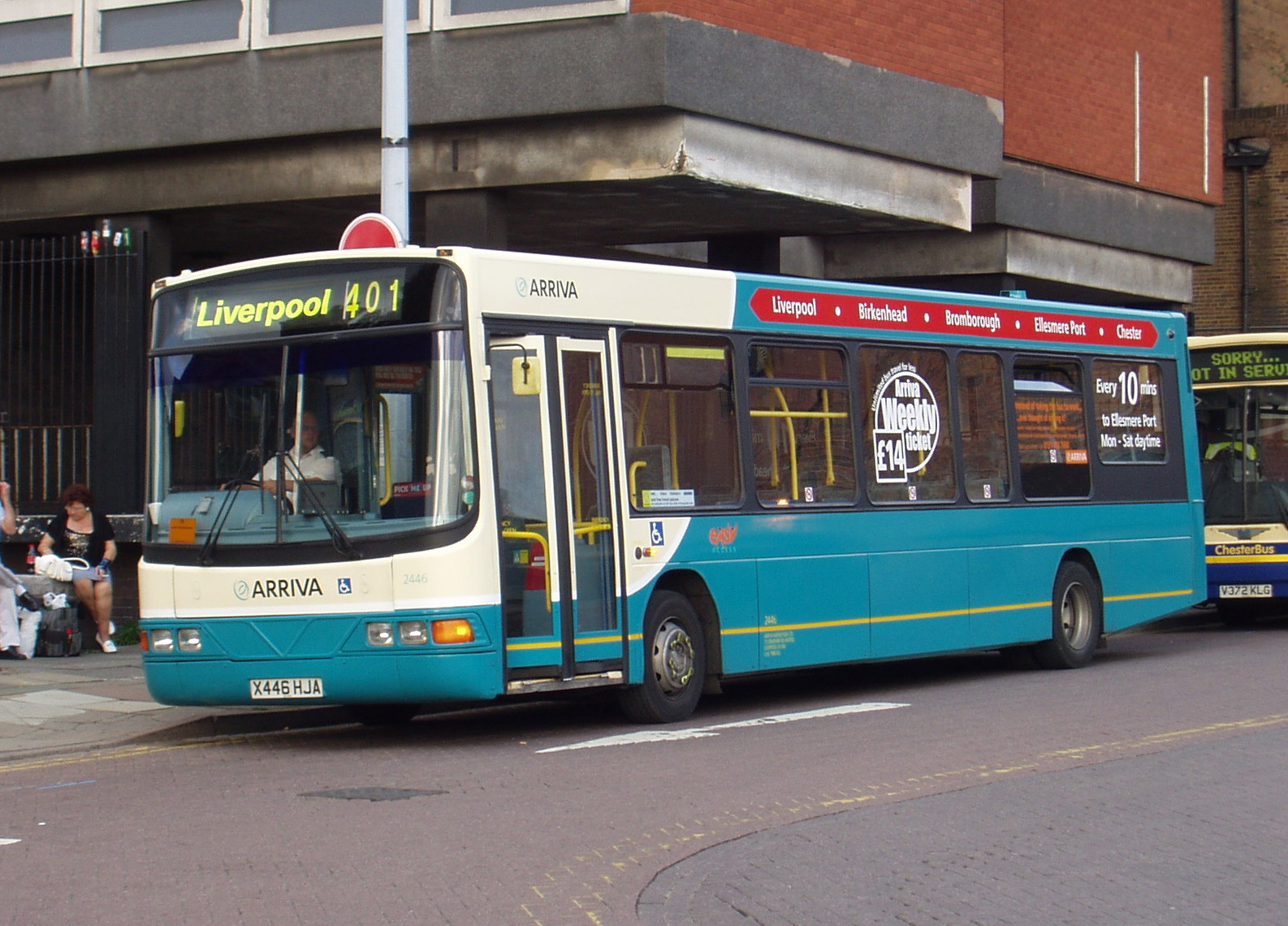
Arriva North West & Wales Wright Cadet bodied VDL SB120 in the livery introduced when the Arriva brand was launched in 1997

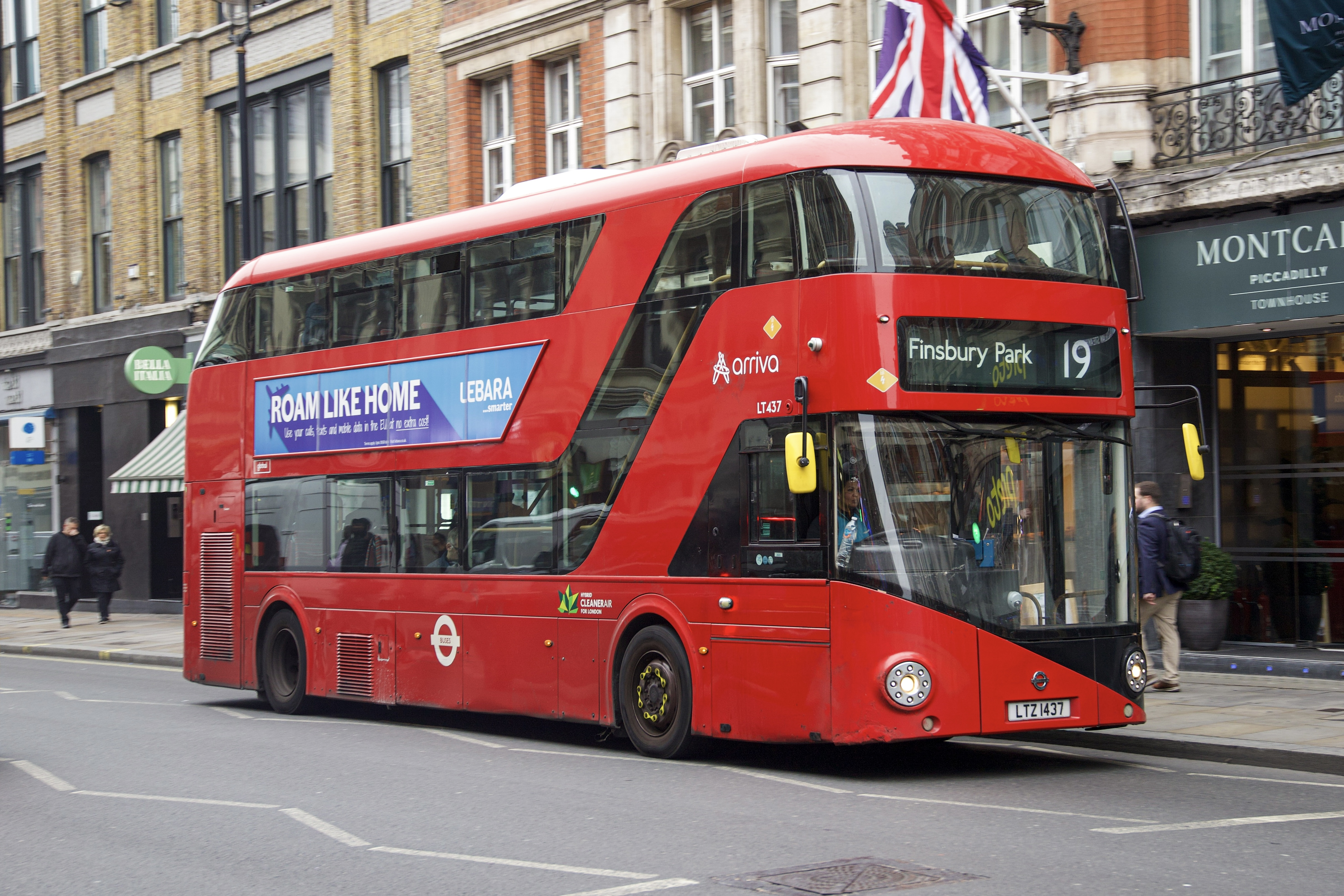
Arriva London New Routemaster in 2024. Arriva London operates contracted services for Transport for London.

The company was founded by TSK Cowie in Sunderland in 1938. It was initially active as a second-hand motorcycle dealer and traded under the name T. Cowie Limited. During 1948, the business was re-launched by Tom Cowie, the founder's son, still selling motorcycles. T Cowie plc was floated in December 1964, and in 1965 it bought out the first of many car dealerships.

In 1972, it formed Cowie Contract Hire, which became the largest contract hire business in the UK. During 1980, T. Cowie made its first foray into bus operations, buying the Grey-Green operation in London from the George Ewer Group. In 1984, T. Cowie p.l.c. acquired the Hanger Group, which included Interleasing, a large vehicle leasing business. Further leasing companies acquired were Marley Leasing, RoyScot Drive and Ringway Leasing. Following the retirement of Tom Cowie, the company was renamed Cowie Group plc during April 1994.

As part of the privatisation of London bus services, Cowie Group acquired the Leaside Buses and South London Transport business units in September 1994 and January 1995 respectively. Cowie Group also bought United Automobile Services and British Bus in July and August 1996, both of which had acquired a number of privatised bus companies. As a result of these transactions, in October 1996, Cowie Group was reclassified on the stock exchange from a motor dealer to a transport group.

In November 1997, the company was rebranded as Arriva p.lc. That same year, it also bought Unibus in Denmark, its first venture outside the United Kingdom.

During June 1999, Arriva sold its vehicle-hire business to General Motors. In February 2000, Arriva purchased MTL Holdings, which included its first UK rail franchises, Merseyrail Electrics and Northern Spirit. Between 2002 and 2003, Arriva sold its motor-retailing businesses, furthermore, in February 2006, it also disposed of its vehicle-rental business to Northgate. During April 2008, the LNWR train maintenance business in England was acquired.

In 2010, it was reported that the government-owned railway companies of France (SNCF) and Germany (Deutsche Bahn) were considering making takeover bids for the business. SNCF subsidiary Keolis and Arriva entered discussions regarding a merger, however, in April 2010, Deutsche Bahn made a takeover offer for Arriva valued at £7.75 per share (£1.585 billion). During August 2010, Deutsche Bahn's takeover bid was approved by the European Commission, albeit conditional on the disposal of some Arriva services in Germany. The takeover took effect on 27 August 2010, and Arriva was delisted from the London Stock Exchange on 31 August 2010.

In late 2011, Arriva acquired Grand Central and sold its Arriva Scotland West bus operation. In May 2013, Arriva purchased Veolia Transport's Central European business with 3,400 vehicles. Arriva changed its logo in January 2018.

In March 2019, DB announced that it would be selling Arriva through either a sale or possible public flotation and invited companies interested in acquiring it to register expressions of interest by 3 May; however, by mid-November, the sale had been reportedly placed on hold. In early 2023, reports again alleged that parent company Deutsche Bahn was considering options for spinning out Arriva to concentrate on its core German rail operations. During the following months, various portions of Arriva's operations in continental Europe were sold to other companies, these disposals have largely focused on bus operations. In October 2023, Deutsche Bahn agreed terms to sell Arriva to I Squared Capital. The sale was completed in June 2024.

== Current operations ==
=== Croatia ===
==== Bus ====
In May 2013, Arriva entered the Croatian bus market with the purchase of Panturist Veolia Osijek (Veolia Transport Central Europe) with 120 buses. In August 2017 Arriva took a 78.34% share in Autotrans Group (ATG); via this move, it became the number one private bus operator active in Croatia.

=== Czech Republic ===
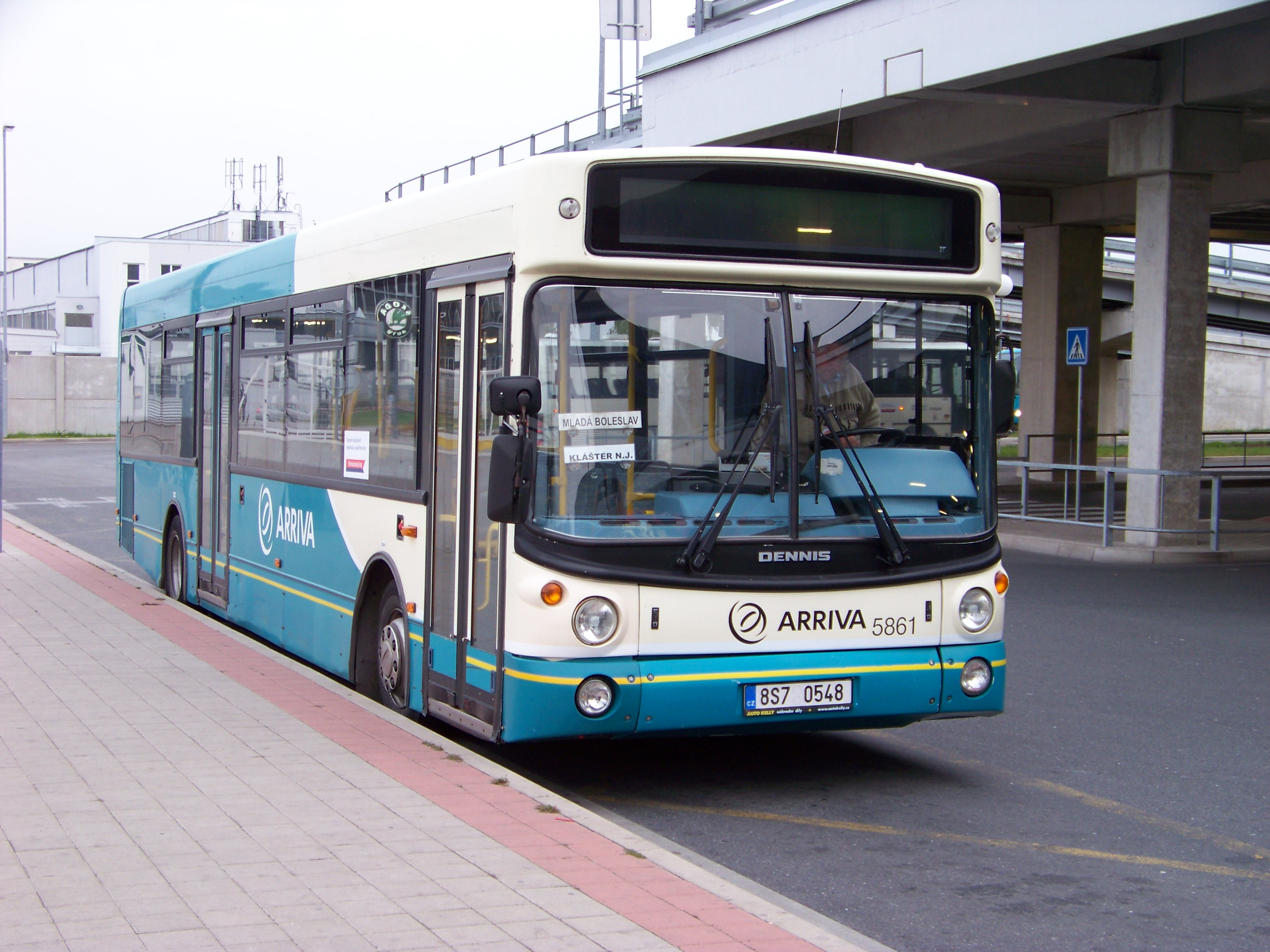
Alexander ALX200 bodied Dennis Dart in Mladá Boleslav

Arriva group bought three medium-sized bus transport companies (Transcentrum Bus s.r.o., Bosák Bus s.r.o. and Osnado s.r.o.) in 2006 and 2007 end established its own rail transport company Arriva vlaky s.r.o. in 2009. These four companies are owned through Arriva holding Česká republika s.r.o. which is owned by the Dutch company Arriva Coöperatie W.A. (majority of 99.9% since 2008).

In July 2013, the current Veolia Transport Česká republika a.s. with its four subsidiary companies fell under Arriva group as Arriva Transport Česká republika a.s. The daughter companies were simultaneously renamed and rebranded as Arriva Praha s.r.o., Arriva Teplice s.r.o., Arriva Vychodni Cechy a.s. and Arriva Morava a.s. They operate primarily buses (it is the biggest bus transport operator in the Czech Republic) but also trolleybuses in Teplice (Arriva Teplice) and Desná Railway (Arriva Morava).

The two Arriva holdings in the Czech Republic have not any direct interconnection yet. Moreover, the Arriva group operated in the Czech Republic also through the German rail transport company Vogtlandbahn GmbH. The former Abellio companies Probo Bus and PT Real, purchased in December 2013, are owned by DB Czech Holding s.r.o. which is owned by German DB Mobility Logistics AG.

==== Bus and coach ====
In December 2006, Arriva purchased Transcentrum Bus, operating services in Mladá Boleslav District of the Central Bohemian Region, north east of Prague. In January 2007, Arriva acquired Bosák Bus, which operates to the south west of Prague and the Příbram District of the Central Bohemian Region. In November 2007, Arriva acquired Osnado, which operates bus and coach services in the north of Hradec Králové Region in East Bohemia, in the foothills of the Giant Mountains. The three bus companies retain their original names but with the Arriva corporate logo and livery. At the turn of 2014/2015, Bosák Bus s.r.o. was merged with Transcentrum Bus s.r.o. and Transcentrum Bus s.r.o. renamed to Arriva Střední Čechy s.r.o.

In July 2013, [Veolia Transport] Česká republika a.s. was purchased with its four subsidiary companies which were renamed Arriva Morava, Arriva Praha, Arriva Teplice and Arriva Východní Čechy. These four companies are owned by holding company Arriva Transport Česká republika. It also operates trolleybuses in Teplice (Arriva Teplice) and trains in Desná Railway (Arriva Morava).

During December 2013, Abellio's Probo Bus and PT Real operations were purchased with 110 buses. As at November 2016, Arriva operated 1,960 buses in the Czech Republic.

==== Train ====
German rail transport company Vogtlandbahn, owned by Arriva since 2004, operated several train routes in the Czech Republic as a subcontractor of České dráhy (München – Regensburg – Hof – Plzeň – Praha, line VB2 Zwickau – Plauen – Bad Brambach – Františkovy Lázně – Cheb – Mariánské Lázně, line VB8 Marktredwitz – Schirnding – Cheb) and GW Train Regio, formerly Viamont (line VB1 Zwickau – Klingenthal – Kraslice – Sokolov). Since December 2010, Vogtlandbahn operates under its own name the line Trilex (Liberec – Zittau – Varnsdorf – Rybniště/Seifhennersdorf). After Arriva was bought by Deutsche Bahn in 2010, Vogtlandbahn was resold to the Italian state railways Ferrovie dello Stato together with Luxembourg infrastructure fund Cube.

Between September 2013 and December 2013, Arriva vlaky tried operating a commercial service from Praha Masarykovo nádraží to Kralupy nad Vltavou in competition with subsidised lines of České dráhy. The company did not succeed with its effort to gain a subsidy for it to continue.

Four trains on the local Desná Railway, operated by Connex Morava (lately Veolia Transport Morava) since 2002, were taken over by Arriva Morava in July 2013. In March 2016, Arriva introduced a weekly service from Praha to Trenčín in Slovakia and daily service from Praha to Benešov. It has applied to increase this to twice daily from December 2016.

=== Hungary ===
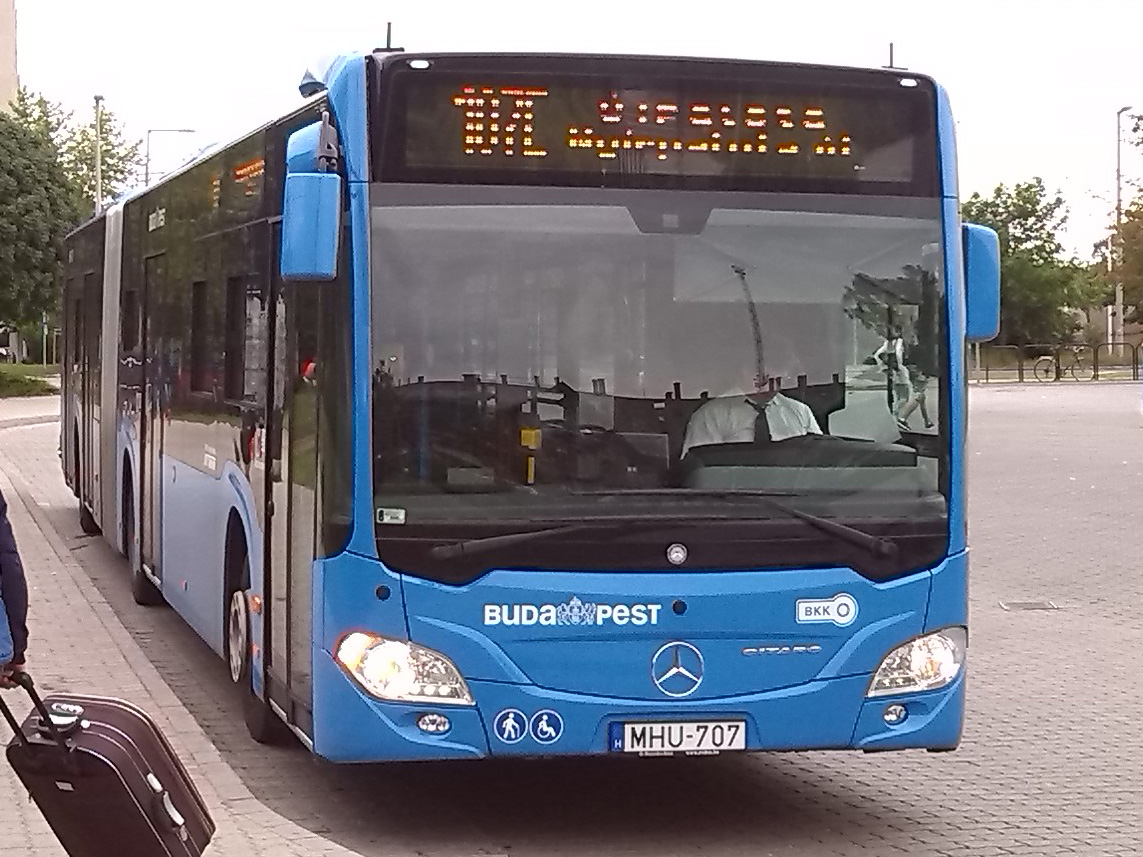
VT Transman Mercedes-Benz O530G Citaro in Budapest in 2013

==== Bus ====
In April 2008, Arriva purchased an 80% shareholding in Eurobus Invest, Hungary's largest private bus operator, which operates services in Hungary and Slovakia. In 2009, Arriva purchased the remaining 20%. Arriva is in a joint venture with Videoton Holding operating as VT Transman.

During May 2013, VT Transman began operating two bus contracts in Budapest for eight years; this arrangement saw 150 Mercedes-Benz Citaros added to the company's 225-strong bus fleet. The joint venture now operates under the VT-Arriva brand.

=== Italy ===
==== Bus and coach ====
In July 2002, Arriva purchased SAB Autoservizi and SAF – Società Autoservizi Friuli-Venezia Giulia operating in Lombardy, Liguria and Friuli-Venezia Giulia regions of northern Italy.

La Linea Yutong ZK6128BEVG opearing on route 81F in Mestre in 2024

During May 2004, Arriva expanded into the Udine area of the Friuli-Venezia Giulia region via the purchase of 49% of 500 bus SAF; it exercised an option in December 2005 to increase its stake to 60%. In October 2005, Arriva began operating in the Piemonte and Valle d'Aosta regions of northern Italy with an 80% shareholding in SADEM, increased to 100% in 2008. During 2006, Arriva purchased a 35% share in Trieste Trasporti, which increased to 40% in 2007.

In June 2007, Arriva entered a joint venture with Ferrovie Nord Milano to purchase 49% of 317 bus SPT Linea, which was then renamed ASF Autolinee. This company manages local public transport in the city of Como.

During 2008, it took control of Brescia-based SAIA Transporti.

In April 2026, Arriva acquired an 80% majority share of La Linea Spa, a major private operator for the Veneto Region

=== Netherlands ===
==== Bus and coach ====
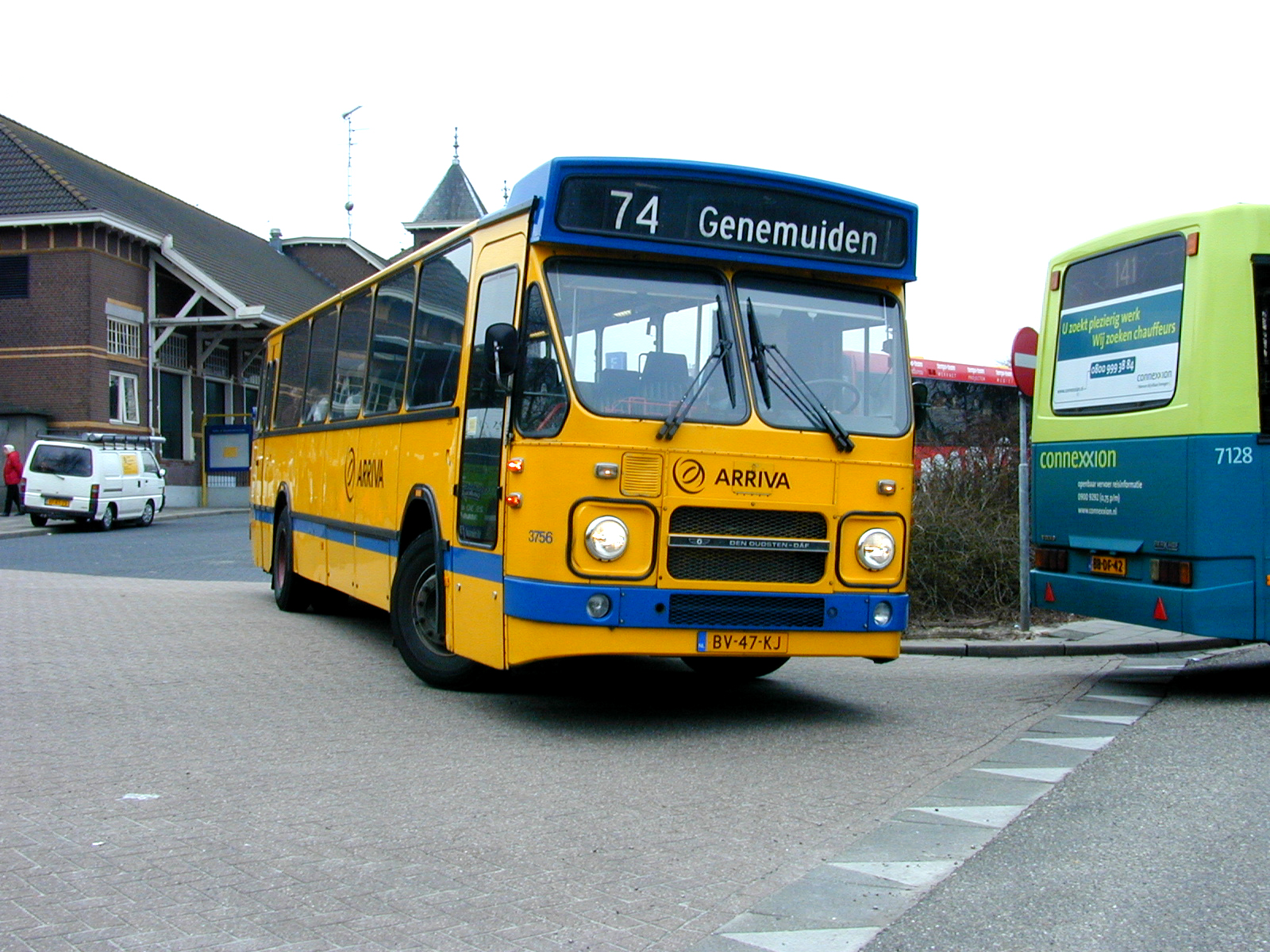
DAF MB200 in 2001

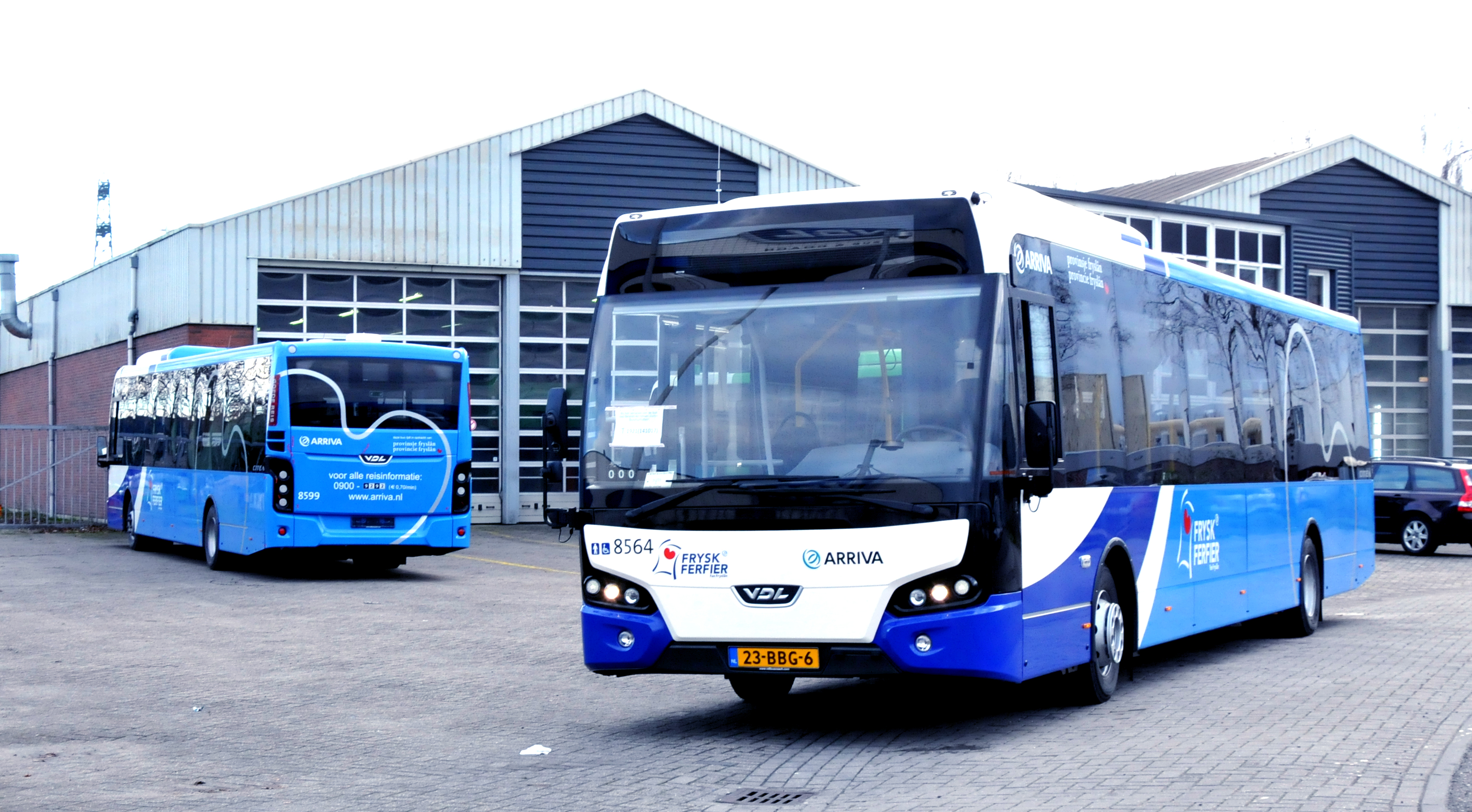
VDL Citea in 2012

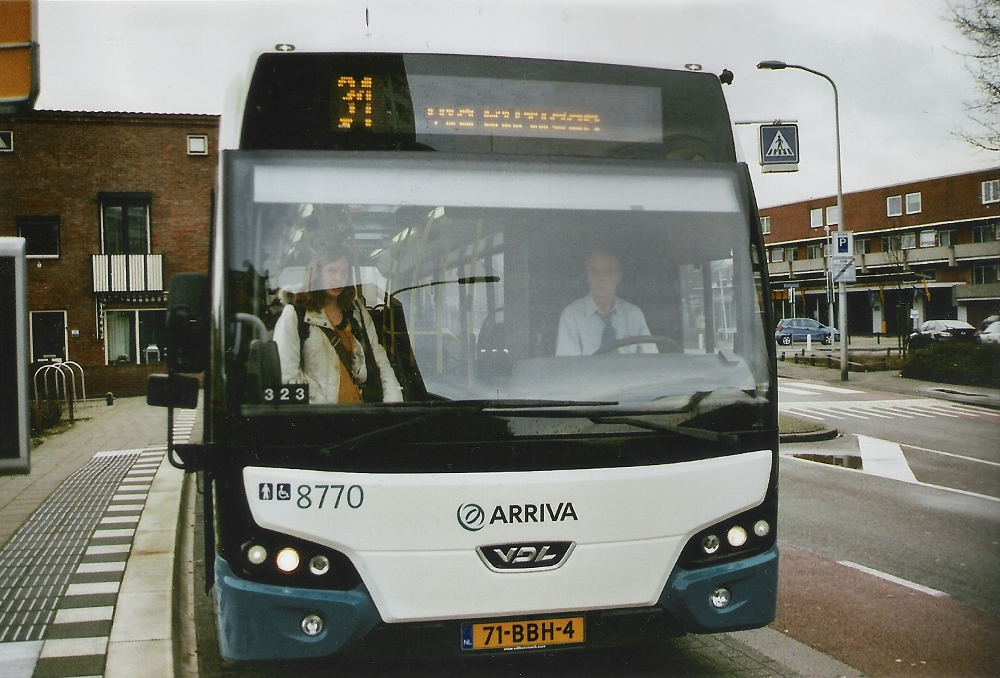
VDL Citea in Katwijk

In January 1998, Arriva purchased Vancom Nederland, it was followed by Veonn & Hanze in December 1998.

During June 1999, it formed a joint venture with Nederlandse Spoorwegen to operate bus services in Friesland; four years later, Arriva took full ownership, after which it was renamed Arriva Openbaar Vervoer.

In 2003, Arriva won further work in Drenthe and Province of Groningen. It was awarded further contracts in 2005 in Drenthe and Waterland and later in the Drechtsteden, Alblasserwaard, Rivierenland, Meierij, Oost-Brabant, and Vijfheerenlanden areas. During 2009, Arriva lost the contracts in Drenthe and Groningen upon retendering yet, in 2010, won a contract in Achterhoek and retained the Rivierenland contract. From December 2012, Arriva won the contract for South Holland North, around Leiden, Alphen aan den Rijn and Gouda and in Friesland around Leeuwarden.

During December 2016, it acquired most of Limburg's bus and train systems.

===== Contracts =====
| Name | From | Until |
|---|---|---|
| Rivierenland | Jan 1, 2003 | Dec 11, 2010 |
| Waterland | Dec 11, 2005 | Dec 10, 2011 |
| Drechtsteden/Alblasserwaard/Vijfheerenlanden | Jan 1, 2007 | Dec 31, 2018 |
| Hoeksche Waard/Goeree-Overflakkee | Jan 1, 2008 | Dec 15, 2014 |
| Meierij | Dec 10, 2006 | Dec 9, 2014 |
| Oost-Brabant | Dec 10, 2006 | Dec 9, 2014 |
| Ameland | Mar 1, 2009 | Dec 31, 2015 |
| Schiermonnikoog | Mar 1, 2009 | Dec 31, 2015 |
| Terschelling | Mar 1, 2009 | Dec 31, 2015 |
| Vlieland | Mar 1, 2009 | Dec 31, 2015 |
| Achterhoek/Rivierenland | Dec 12, 2010 | Jan 1, 2021 |
| Lelystad/Flevoland | Sep 4, 2011 | Sep 4, 2021 |
| North and Southwest Friesland | Dec 9, 2012 | Dec 12, 2020 |
| South Holland Noord | Dec 9, 2012 | Dec 12, 2020 |
| Limburg | Dec 11, 2016 | Dec 31, 2026 |

==== Train ====
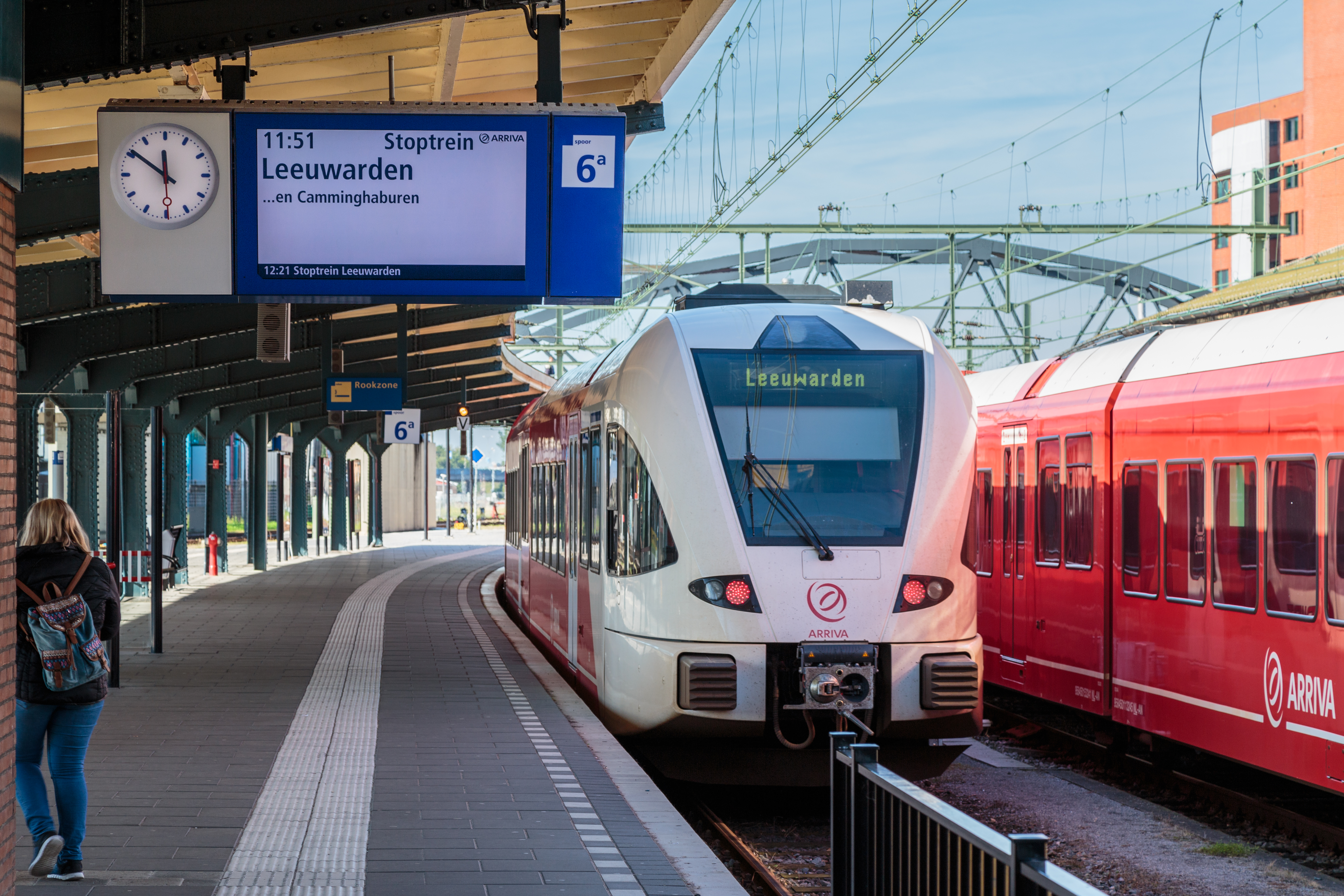
Arriva Train (Stadler SPURT) in Groningen CS

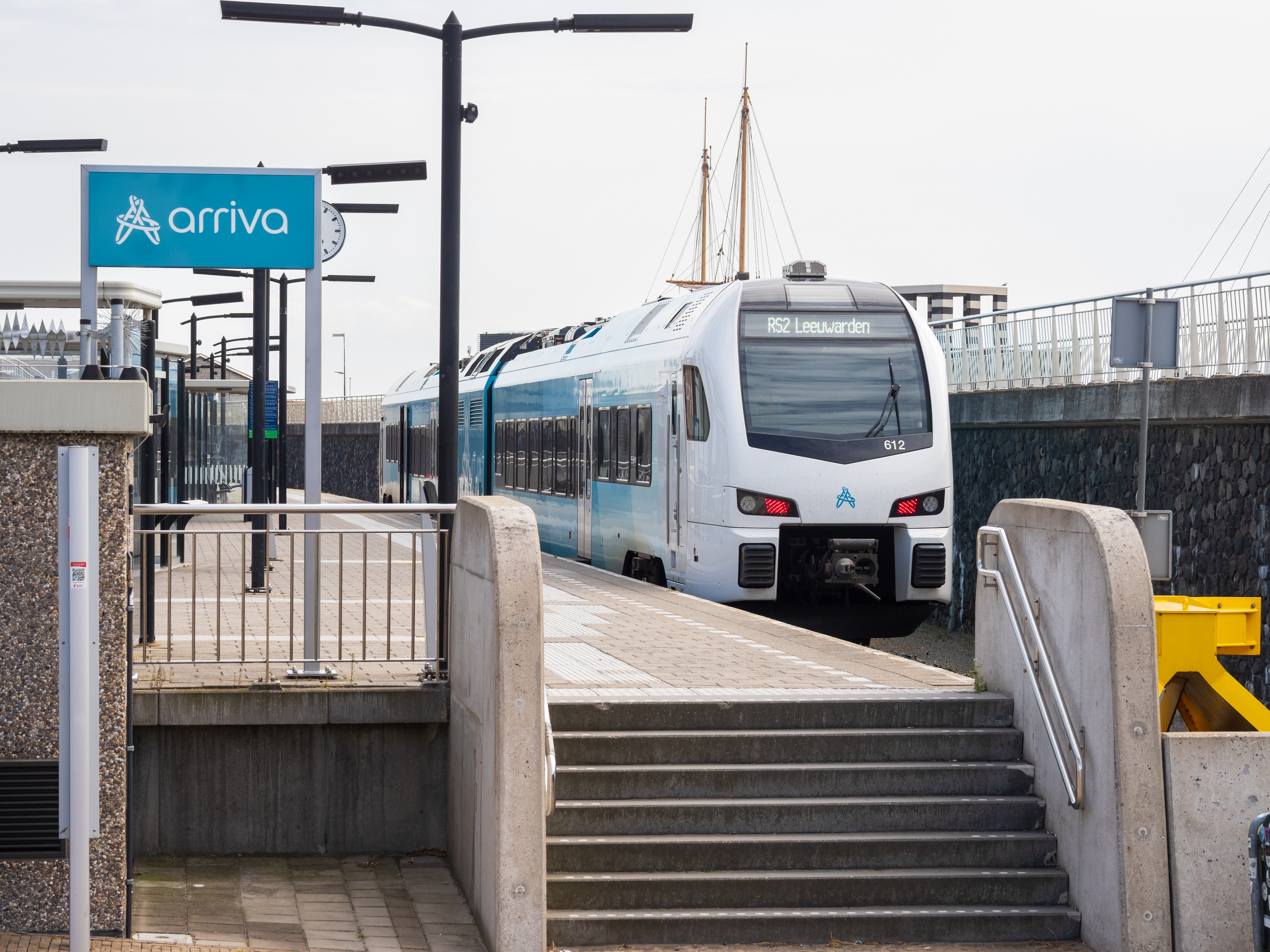
Arriva Train (Stadler WINK) in Harlingen haven

During 1999, Arriva established NoordNed as a joint venture company with the Dutch state-owned passenger rail company Nederlandse Spoorwegen. In 2003, the company took full ownership of the former joint venture, opting to drop the NoordNed branding two years later. During 2005, Arriva was awarded a 15-year contract to operate trains from Groningen to Leeuwarden, Delfzijl, Roodeschool and Nieuweschans. It also secured a contract to operate trains from Leeuwarden to Harlingen Haven and to Stavoren. Later that year, it secured a contract to operate trains from Dordrecht to Gorinchem and on to Geldermalsen (MerwedeLingelijn). In 2012, Arriva commenced operating trains in the Achterhoek and between Zwolle and Emmen; these services operate under the Spurt brand.

Arriva Stadler GTW in Groningen preparing to depart towards Leeuwarden in January 2025

On 21 June 2013, Arriva was selected to operate a new service between The Hague and Brussels. Service was set to start in December 2015, but the project was cancelled in 2014 because the involved parties could not agree upon a final business case and because NS reactivated the original service to Brussels, which made the new Arriva service unnecessary.

During December 2016, Arriva acquired the majority of Limburg's bus and train systems.

In June 2024, a train of Arriva has been extended from Maastricht to Liège-Guillemins in cooperation with the National Railway Company of Belgium to replace the existing service there. The resulting Three Countries Train runs from Liège-Guillemins to Aachen Hbf.

===== Contracts =====
| Name | From | Until |
|---|---|---|
| Groningen/Friesland | Dec 11, 2005; Dec 13, 2020 | Dec 12, 2020; Dec 15, 2035 |
| Merwede-Lingelijn | Jan 1, 2007 | Dec 31, 2018 |
| North and Southwest Friesland | Dec 9, 2012 | Dec 11, 2027 |
| Gelderland/Achterhoek | Dec 9, 2012 | Jan 1, 2021 |
| Zwolle-Emmen | Dec 9, 2012 | Jan 1, 2021 |
| Limburg | Dec 11, 2016 | Dec 12, 2031 |

==== Bus and train combination ====
The Province of Limburg awarded a contract in June 2015 to Arriva to provide for the entire public transport (buses and five regional rail lines) in Limburg from December 2016 up until 2031. Abellio has originally been named the preferred bidder, but after it was discovered Abellio had gained some information that was not available to the other bidders, the contract was withdrawn. Another tenderer, Veolia, announced they will object to the decision of the province.

=== Poland ===
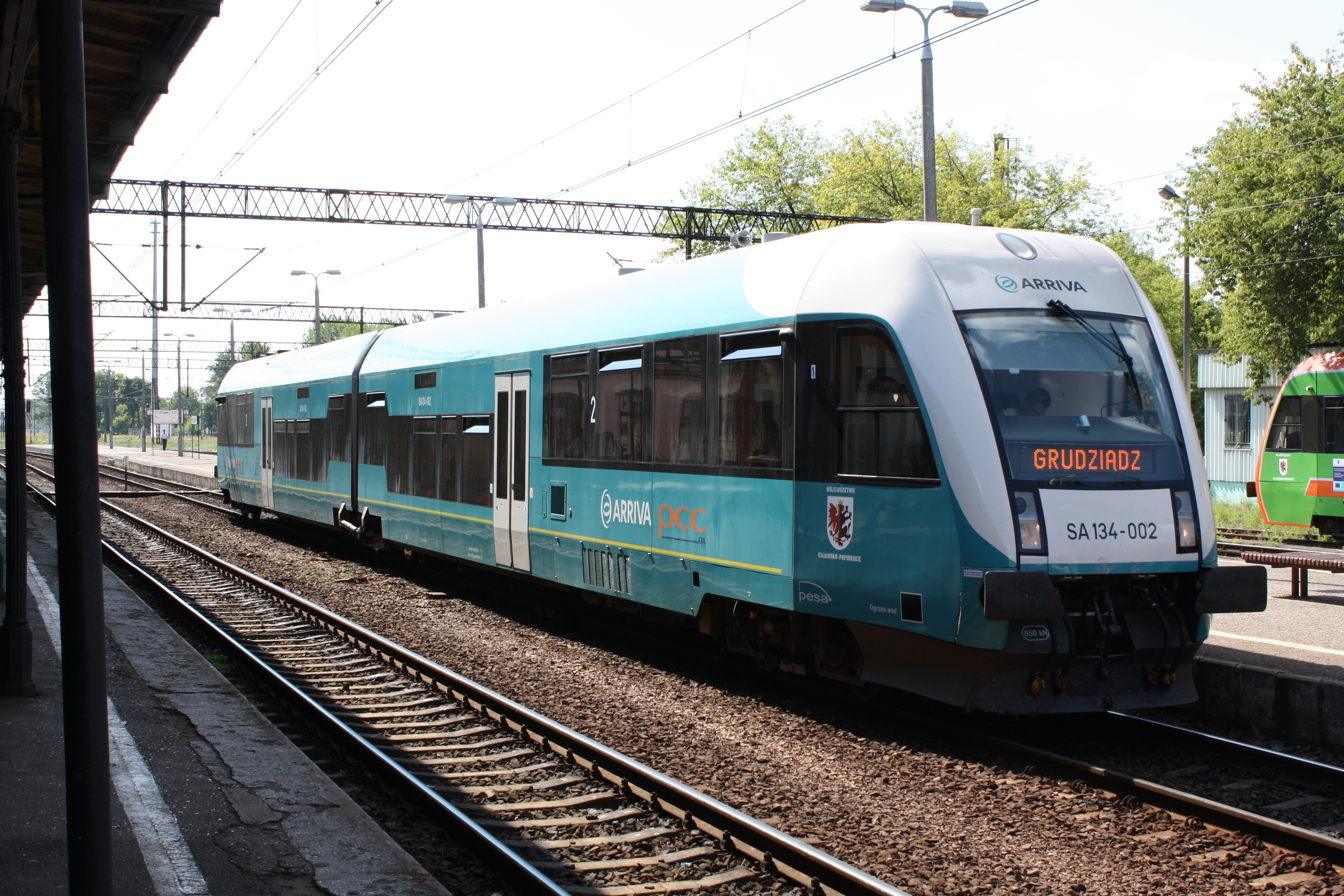
SA134 multiple unit at Toruń station in 2008

==== Bus ====
During May 2013, Arriva entered the Polish bus market through its acquisition of Veolia Transport Central Europe along with its 840 buses. However, during the summer of 2023, the company divested its bus activities in Polish market.

==== Train ====
During December 2006, Arriva formed Arriva PCC, a joint venture with PCC Rail in December 2006. In December 2007, Arriva commenced operating services on all non-electrified lines in the Kuyavian-Pomeranian Voivodeship. In June 2010, Arriva took 100% ownership of the business and renamed it Arriva RP. During December 2010, Arriva RP was awarded a ten-year extension to its Kuyavian-Pomeranian Voivodeship activities.

In December 2013, Arriva started operating trains on four electrified lines in the Kujawsko-Pomorskie Voivodship using 12 existing trains to serve roughly 50 railway stations for an initial period of two years. In September 2017, it was announced that Arriva RP had secured several open access paths in Poland. During October 2022, Arriva RP signed a new contract, valued at €157.5 million per year, covering the extension of its operations in the Kuyavian-Pomeranian Voivodeship region for a further eight years, up until 2030.

Arriva RP also operates in the Pomeranian Voivodeship during the summer months. During which, The company runs a seasonal line from Bydgoszcz to Hel, as well as a route from Władysławowo to Hel.

=== Portugal ===
==== Bus and coach ====
Transportes Sul do Tejo logo.

In November 2000, Arriva purchased João Carlos Soares e Filhos, Viação Costa & Lino Lda, Ami-Transportes and Abílio da Costa Moreira & C Lda who were running inter-urban local bus services in the north west of Portugal.

During June 2002, Arriva bought a 51% shareholding Transportes Sul do Tejo, a scheduled bus and coach operator in the growing commuter region south of Lisbon. In September 2003, Arriva exercised an option to buy the remainder of the company. In May 2006, Arriva acquired a 21.5% share of leading transport company Barraqueiro, with bus and rail operations in and around Lisbon, increasing the shareholding in January 2008 to 31.5%.

In December 2021, Arriva Portugal announced the closure of its operation by the end of the year.

=== Slovakia ===
==== Bus ====
In July 2008, Arriva entered the Slovak bus market with the purchase of an 80% share in Eurobus Invest, getting control over the SAD Nové Zámky and SAD Michalovce bus companies. In July 2015, it purchased SAD Liorbus and SAD Trnava. Coach services are operated under the Arriva Express brand. By November 2016, Arriva was employing 2,390 people and operated 1,335 buses. In the meantime, Arriva also bought the bus company Veolia transport Nitra.

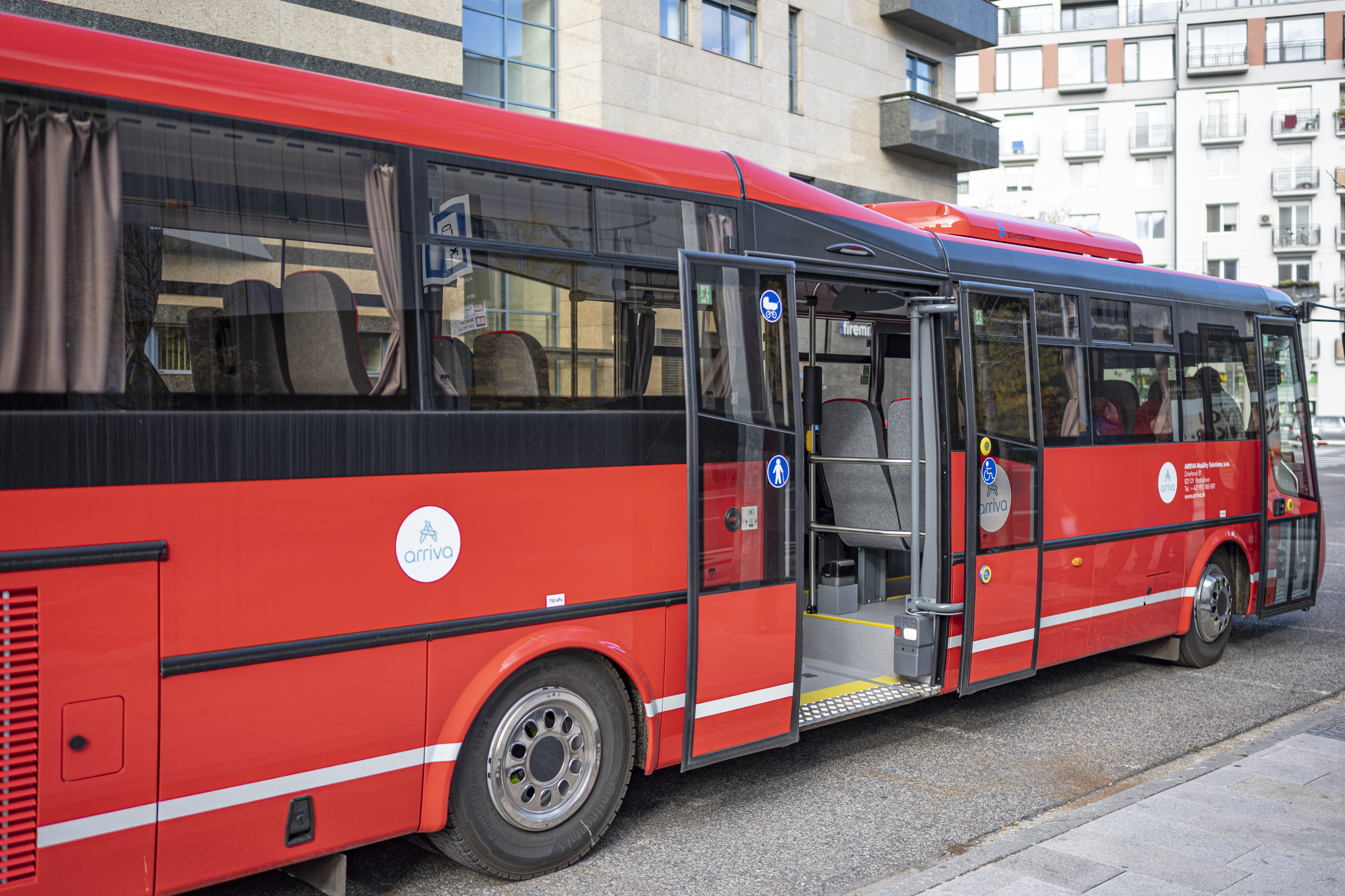
Arriva SOR bus for Bratislava Region

During 2021, Arriva was awarded a ten-year contract to operate IDS BK regional buses in Bratislava Region via its subsidiary Arriva Mobility Services s.r.o.

=== Slovenia ===
==== Bus ====
In May 2013, Arriva entered the Slovenian bus market with the purchase of Veolia Transport Central Europe (Veolia Transport Štajerska, Veolia Transport Dolenjska and Primorska) with 270 buses.

=== Spain ===
==== Bus ====
In July 1998, Arriva purchased Ideal Auto Sociedad Anónima (IASA) followed in September 1999 by Transportes Finisterre, both in Galicia. Their services cover three of the four provinces in the region: A Coruña, Lugo and Ourense, including part of the famous Santiago pilgrimage route. In January 2002, Arriva commenced operating in Mallorca with the purchase of Autocares Mallorca and Bus Nord. These operate on the northern and western parts of the island, linking the capital Palma with towns such as Soller, Inca and Alcúdia.

During 2007, Arriva acquired Autocares Fray Escoba and Esfera in Madrid. In July 2008, Arriva acquired Empresa de Blas y Cia, which operates routes between Madrid and southwestern cities in its metropolitan area (Alcorcón, Móstoles, Villaviciosa de Odón, Navalcarnero...), and between those cities.

=== United Kingdom ===
==== Bus and coach ====
Arriva operates 5,900 buses in London, the north east, north west and south east of England, Yorkshire, the Midlands, Wales and previously Scotland.

==== Patient transport ====
Arriva Transport Solutions provides non-emergency ambulance services, typically to convey disabled patients to and from hospital out-patient appointments. These services, formerly provided by ambulance services, are now awarded by competitive tender. The company has been running these services in Nottinghamshire, Leicestershire and Rutland since 2012. A report by the Care Quality Commission in 2014 said that patients were "often" arriving late for appointments, and taxi drivers with "poor attitudes" being used when other resources were unavailable.

Following its successful bid over the rival North West ambulance service for non–emergency transport, in Greater Manchester Arriva admitted it had submitted incorrect performance figures which had earned it a £1.5m bonus. Arriva had been the subject of many complaints about its service. Comparisons were drawn with misreporting in the UK Serco scandal and MPs said the Serious Fraud Office may need to be involved.

==== Train ====
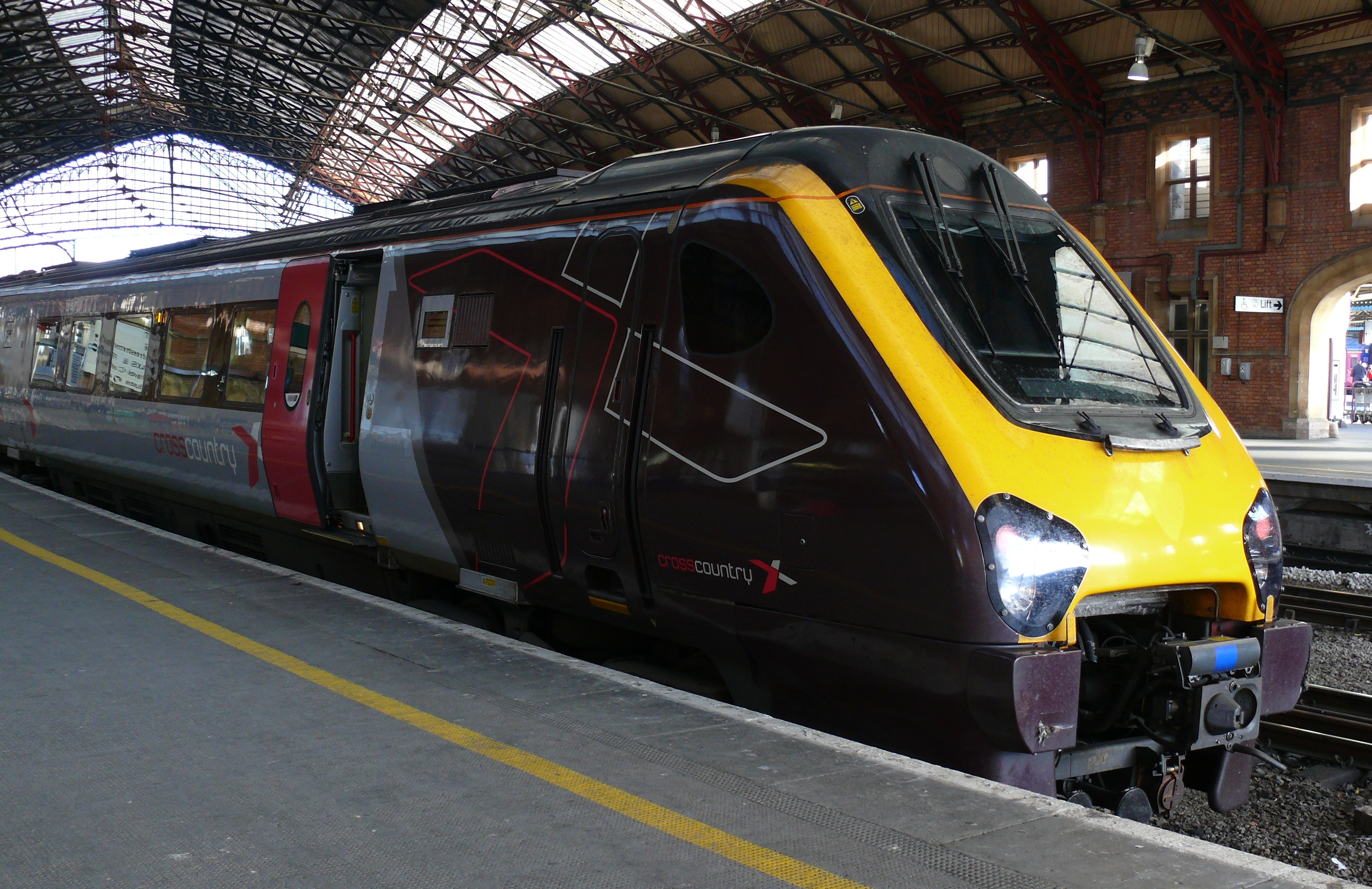
CrossCountry Class 220 Voyager at Bristol Temple Meads in 2010

Arriva has operated a number of rail franchises in the UK since the privatisation of British Rail in 1996, through its subsidiary, Arriva UK Trains. It gained its first franchises in February 2000. Arriva UK Trains currently runs a number of train operating companies:

- CrossCountry: operates long-distance cross-country routes, franchise runs until 15 October 2027
- Grand Central: open-access operator with services on the East Coast Main Line purchased in November 2011

Arriva TrainCare (previously LNWR) operates train maintenance depots at Bristol, Cambridge, Crewe, Eastleigh and Newcastle.

Following the purchase of Arriva by Deutsche Bahn in August 2010, Arriva UK Trains expanded to take over Deutsche Bahn's existing DB Regio UK division which consisted of Chiltern Railways, Tyne & Wear Metro and London Overground Rail Operations.

Arriva UK Trains wishes to expand the number of UK Rail businesses it operates by developing open access operations and successfully bidding for further Department for Transport rail franchises. Alliance Rail Holdings continues to develop new open access proposals following the rejection of its initial plans by the Office of Rail Regulation in 2011.

Between 2011 and 2012, Arriva's applications to bid for the InterCity West Coast, Greater Anglia, Essex Thameside and Thameslink franchises were all rejected by the Department for Transport. Following this run of failure Arriva was publicly critical of the government's prequalification process and called for it to be abolished. However, Arriva was subsequently shortlisted for the Greater Western, Crossrail, Caledonian Sleeper and ScotRail franchises.

== Former operations ==
=== Denmark ===
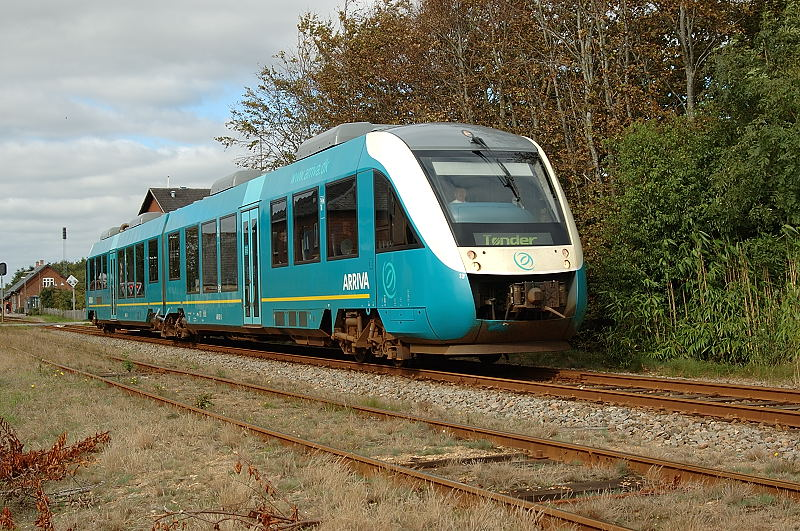
Alstom Coradia LINT train in Denmark in 2007

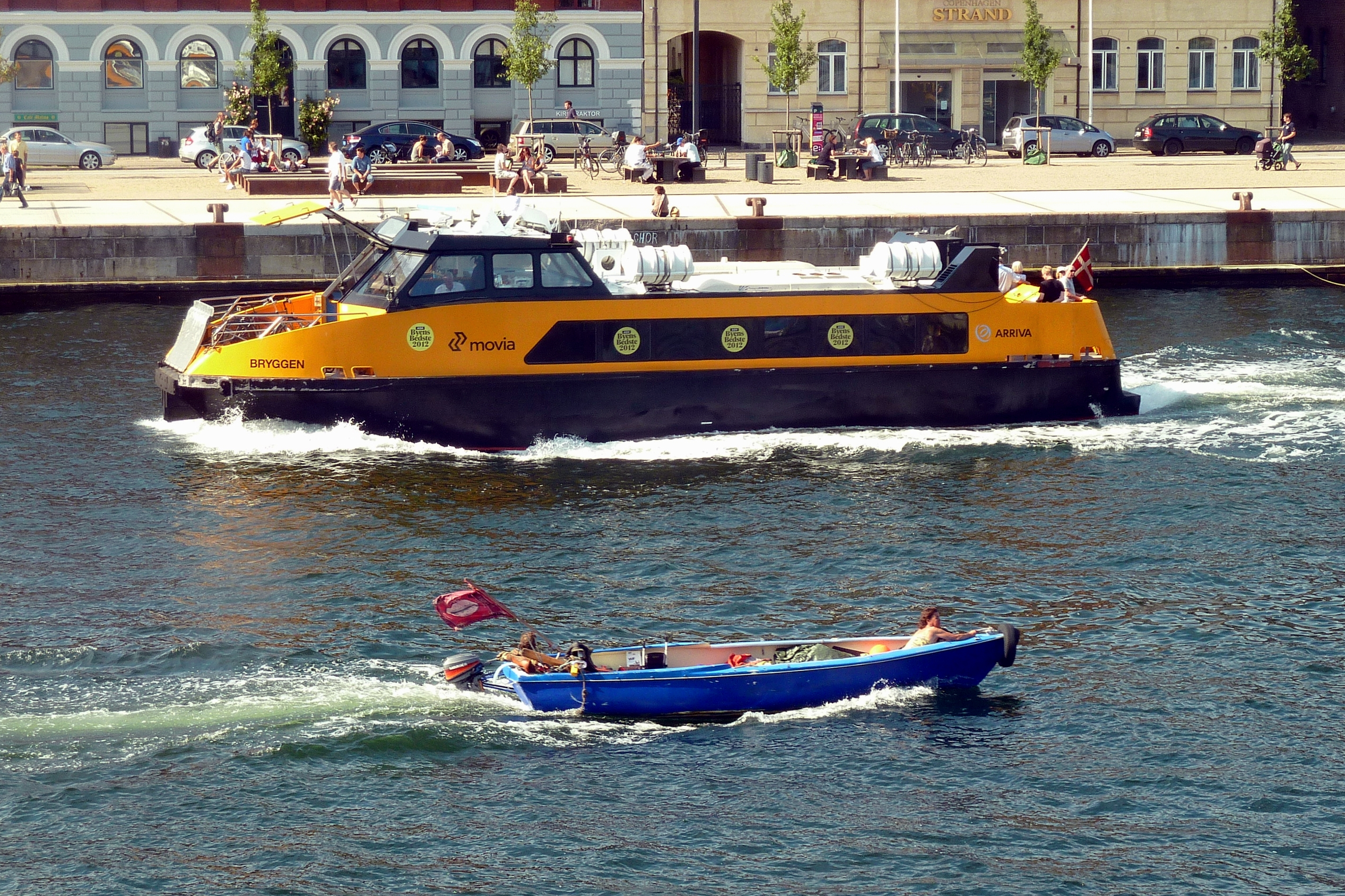
Waterbus in Copenhagen in 2012

==== Bus ====
In September 1997, Arriva purchased Unibus. During March 1999, Arriva Denmark expanded with the acquisition of Bus Danmark. In April 2001, Arriva acquired Denmark's largest bus operator, Combus, along with its 1,200 vehicles. In August 2004, Arriva purchased Wulff, which operated buses in Jutland and Copenhagen. In 2007, Arriva acquired Veolia Denmark, then Denmark's second largest bus operator with 640 buses. Arriva operates 50% of bus services in Copenhagen and 40% throughout Denmark.

==== Train ====
In mid-2002, Arriva began to operate services on the Varde to Nørre Nebel line. In March 2012, Arriva was awarded an extension to this franchise through to June 2018.

During 2003, Arriva began operating an eight-year contract to operate services in mid Jutland. In March 2009, Arriva was awarded an extension through to December 2018. At one point, Arriva operated 17% of all services on the Danish rail network.

==== Waterbus ====
In 2000, Arriva began operating waterbuses in Copenhagen's harbour.

==== Sale and rebranding ====
In May 2023 Arriva Denmark was sold to the German investment fund Mutares. In December 2023 Arriva Denmark announced that they would rebrand as GoCollective during the course of 2024.

=== Germany ===
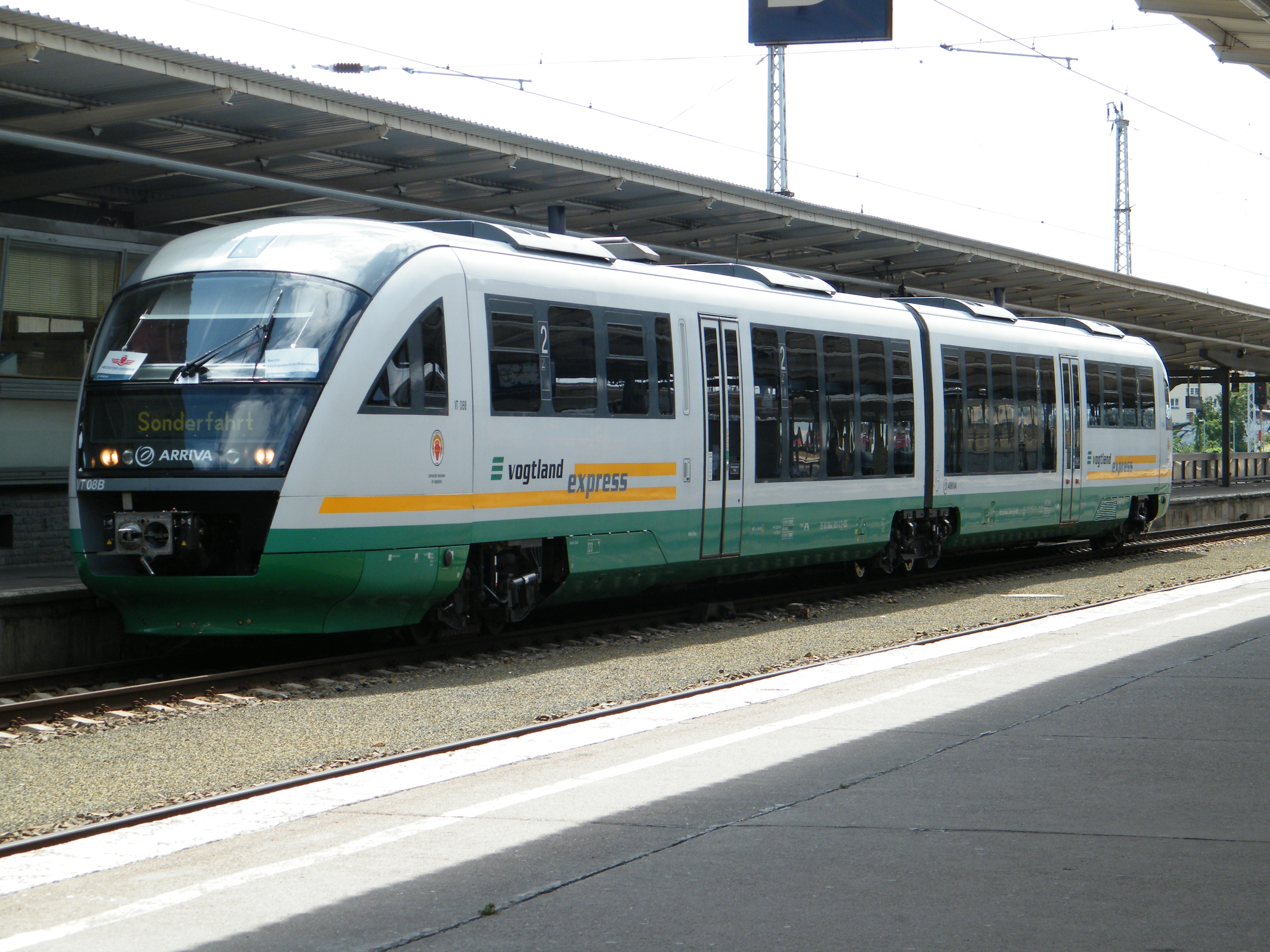
Siemens Desiro in 2009

==== Bus ====
In February 2005, Arriva purchased Sippel, a bus operator in the Rhine Main. In May 2006 Verkehrsbetriebe Bils was purchased followed in December 2006 by 80% of NeiBeverkehr.

==== Train ====
In April 2004, Arriva purchased Prignitzer Eisenbahn Gruppe which operated five franchises. In October 2004 a 77% shareholding, increased later in the year to 93%, was purchased in Regentalbahn. In 2007, Arriva purchased an 85% shareholding in Osthannoversche Eisenbahnen.

As part of the takeover of Arriva by Deutsche Bahn, Arriva's German railway operations were sold to Ferrovie dello Stato to comply with a European Commission condition. These are now branded as Netinera.

=== Malta ===
==== Bus ====
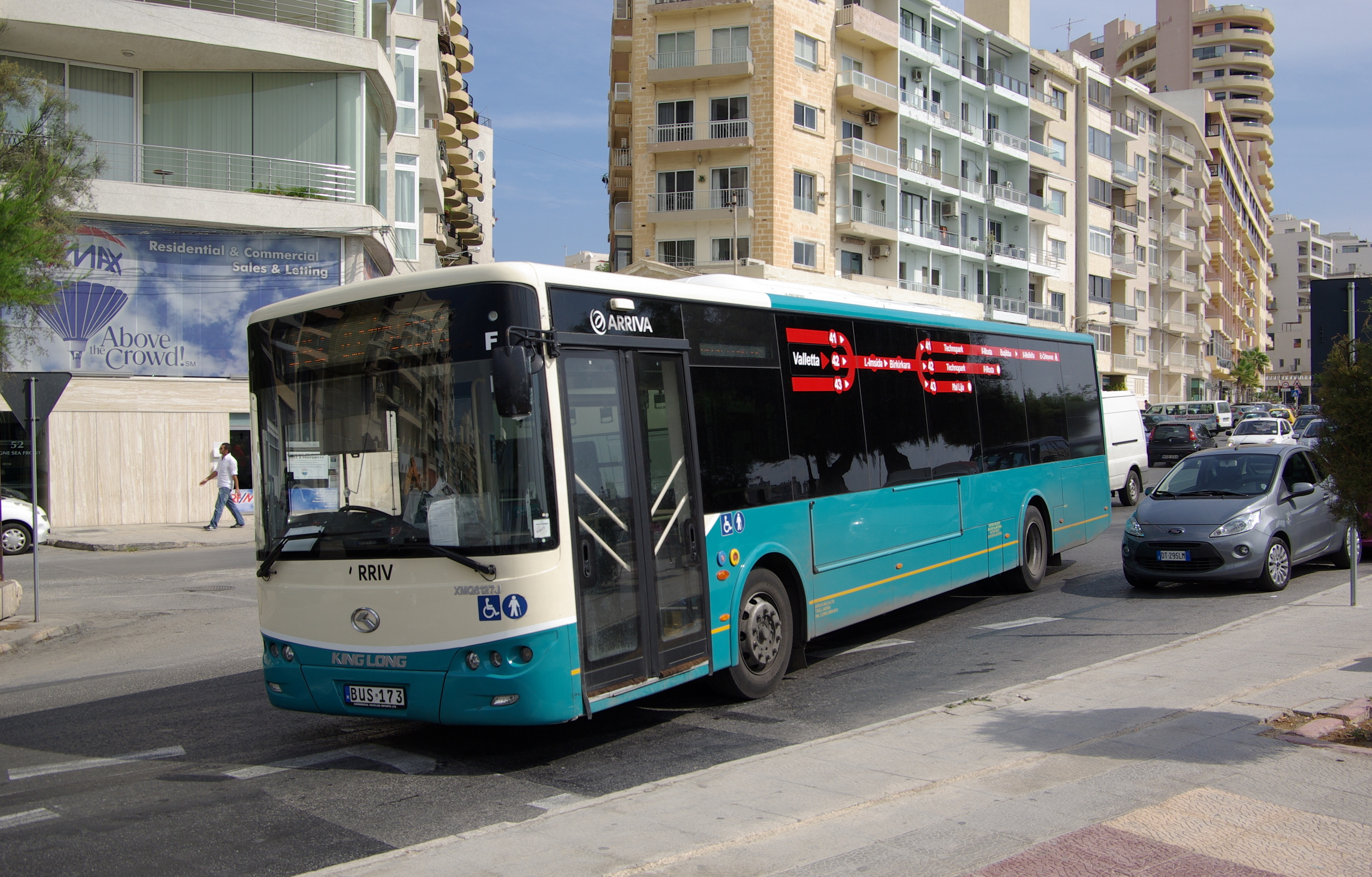
King Long in Sliema in 2011

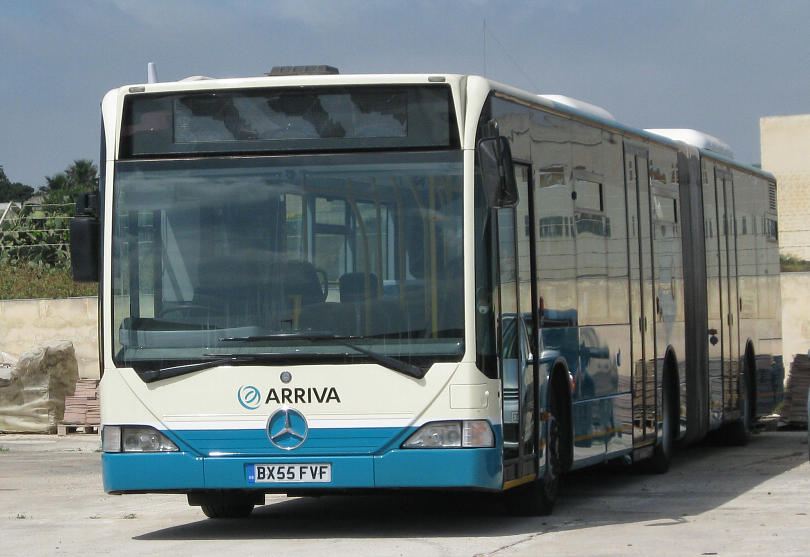
Mercedes-Benz O530G Citaro at the Malta depot in 2011

In July 2011, Arriva commenced operating a ten-year concession to operate all scheduled bus services on Malta and Gozo. Arriva held a 67% shareholding with the local Tumas Group owning the remaining 33%.

The main fleet of Arriva Malta was formed of 172 new King Long buses. These were supported on high-density routes by 68 former Arriva London Mercedes-Benz O530G Citaro articulated buses. Ten hybrid Optare Solos and two Bluebird mini-buses for use in the city of Valletta were also purchased. An assortment of the newest buses from the former owner/driver pre-July 2011 operation were also acquired and refurbished to bring them broadly into line with the rest of the fleet. This included the fitting of air conditioning and CCTV equipment and rebranding into standard Arriva livery for daily use alongside the main fleet. These included buses built by SCARNIF, MCV, BMC, King Long and Saracakis among others, with the main common factor being that they are all fully automatic and low floor designs.

Arriva has been harshly criticised both by commuters and by the government agency Transport Malta for consistently failing to keep up standards. On 14 November 2012, Arriva was harshly reprimanded by Transport Malta and given until the end of the month to bring up all its routes to 100% efficiency before TM deploys its own shuttles at Arriva's expense.

In August 2013, the Government of Malta instructed Arriva Malta to remove the articulated buses from service, pending investigation following three major fire outbreaks in the span of 48 hours. The fires destroyed the buses and in one case caused extensive damage to some nearby vehicles belonging to MaltaPost, the country's postal operator. Nobody was injured in these incidents. Like in the UK when the same buses had caught fire, these buses became a popular joke in conversations and social media sites.

By the end of December 2013, Arriva had reportedly run up losses of €50 million in two and a half years.

On 1 January 2014, Arriva ceased operations in Malta, with the services nationalised by the Maltese government as Malta Public Transport. Upon being tendered, the services were taken over by ALSA.

=== Serbia ===
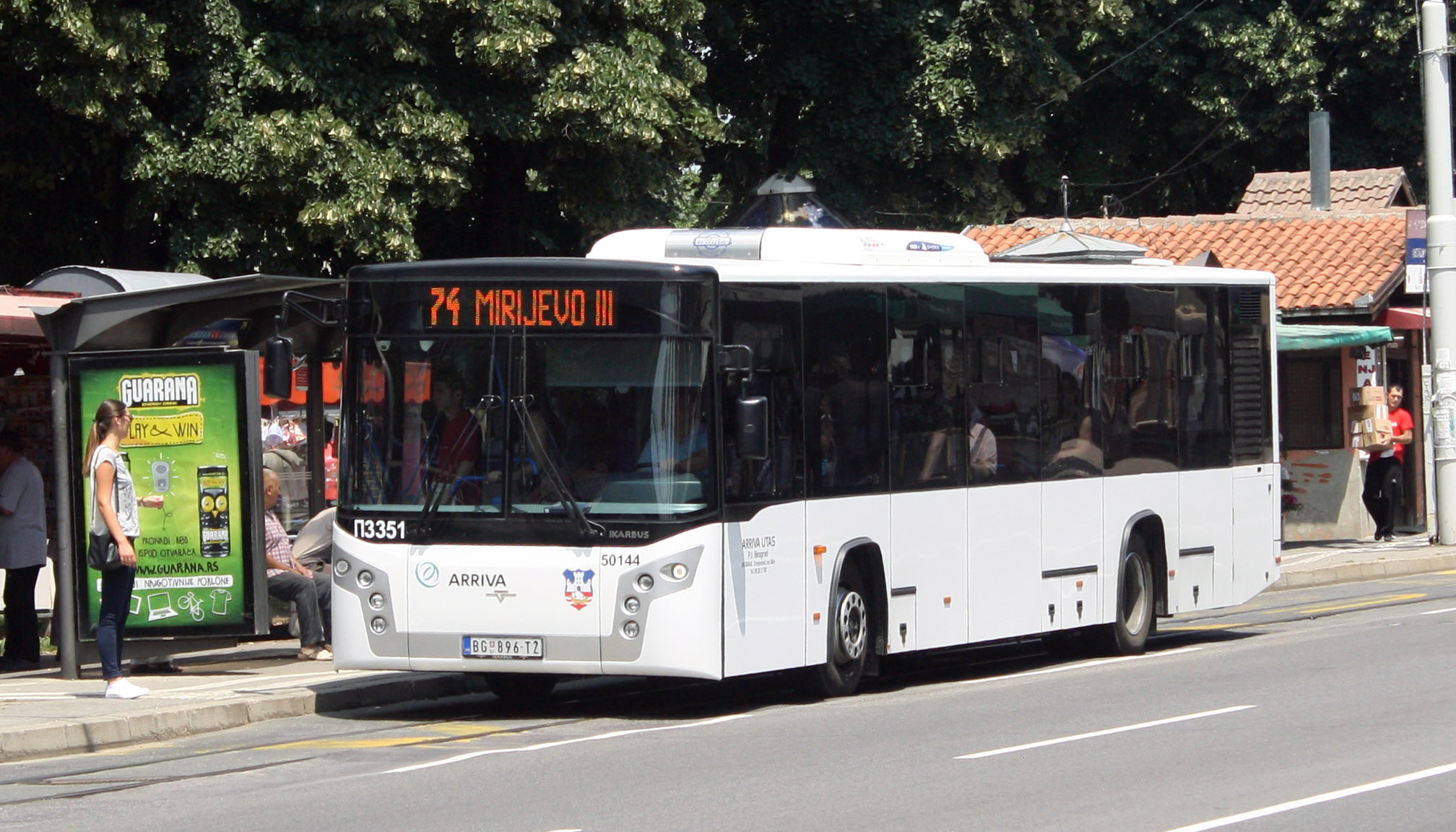
Arriva Ikarbus IK 112 bus operating in Belgrade bus public transport.

==== Bus ====
In May 2013, Arriva entered the Serbian bus market with the purchase of Veolia Transport Central Europe (Veolia Transport Litas in Požarevac and Veolia Transport Luv in Belgrade) with 250 buses. In January 2015, Arriva commenced operating bus services in Niš with 33 buses. In 2023, Arriva was rebranded as Mobilitas, which was later in the year sold to Mutares.

=== Sweden ===
Arriva operated in Sweden until 2022, when it sold its Swedish operations to the Finnish state-owned VR Group, and was rebranded as VR Sverige.

==== Bus ====
Arriva operated bus lines in southern Sweden/The Skåne Region from 1997 when it purchased Unibus of Denmark.

Arriva operated bus lines in certain municipalities in the Stockholm County: Sigtuna Municipality, Upplands Väsby Municipality and Vallentuna Municipality from 1 March 2009 until 21 June 2019. In Ekerö Municipality, traffic started on 1 March 2009 however Arriva won this contract again in 2019. The E32 contract which was procured in 2019 had three contesters Arriva who came on first place, Nobina who came on second place and Transdev who came on third place. In August 2012, Arriva began operation in western Stockholm with 255 buses under a 12-year contract with the regional transport authority. In January 2013 a further 229 buses were added. When Arriva took over the Roslagen Light Rail and bus traffic in the Roslagen area of Stockholm, there was total chaos. Arriva's failure to follow the contract resulted in a fine of 174 million kronor.

Arriva operated services in the Halland Region from June 2010, partly taking over services from Swebus. In July 2022, Arriva sold all of its Swedish bus operations to VR Group with 800 buses.

==== Train ====
In June 2007, Arriva won a nine-year franchise for the Pågatåg regional rail services in Skåne County, south Sweden.

During 2009, Arriva expanded its rail operations in the country with a new contract operating the Kinnekulletåget between Göteborg and Örebro. In December 2010, DB Regio Sverige AB started to operate regional trains in Östgötapendeln. In November 2011, the company was renamed Arriva Östgötapendeln AB.

From August 2012, Arriva has operated the Stockholm light rail systems Tvärbanan light rail, Nockebybanan light rail, Lidingöbanan light rail, and Saltsjöbanan railway. In January 2013, Arriva commenced operating the Roslagsbanan railway in the north of Stockholm. In July 2022, Arriva sold all of its Swedish rail operations to the Finnish state-owned VR Group with 238 trains.

=== United Kingdom ===
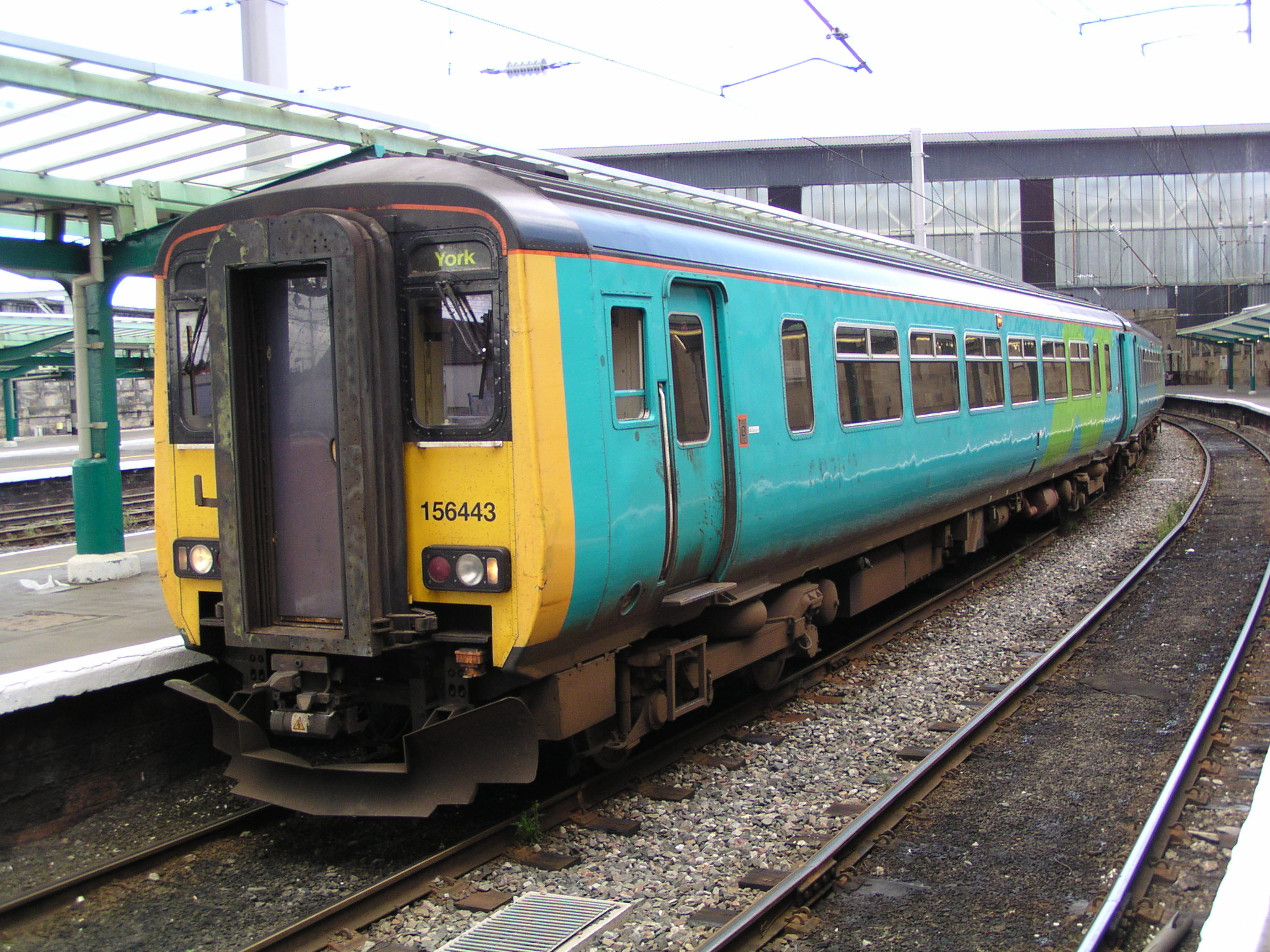
Arriva Trains Northern Class 156 at Carlisle in 2004

==== Bus ====
- Arriva Scotland West sold to McGill's Bus Services in March 2012
- The Original Tour sold to RATP Group in September 2014
- Arriva Horsham sold to Metrobus in 2009

==== Train ====
- Arriva Rail London: operated the London Overground, concession now operated by First Rail London
- Arriva Trains Merseyside ran urban rail services on Merseyside from February 2000 until March 2003
- Arriva Trains Northern ran local rail services in Northern England for the Regional Railways North East franchise from March 1997 until December 2004
- Arriva Trains Wales: operated the majority of rail services in Wales, the Wales & Borders franchise ran from 7 December 2003 until 13 October 2018.
- Chiltern Railways: operated services on the Chiltern Main Line, operations transferred to the state-owned train operating company of the same name
- London Overground Rail Operations 50/50 joint venture with MTR Corporation, operated London Overground concession from November 2007 until November 2016, now operated by Arriva Rail London
- Arriva Rail North: operated from 1 April 2016 until 29 February 2020
- Tyne & Wear Metro operated from April 2010 until March 2017
- Wrexham & Shropshire joint venture open access operation (50% shareholding). Ran services between Wrexham and London, ceased January 2011 due to lack of profitability

== Branding ==
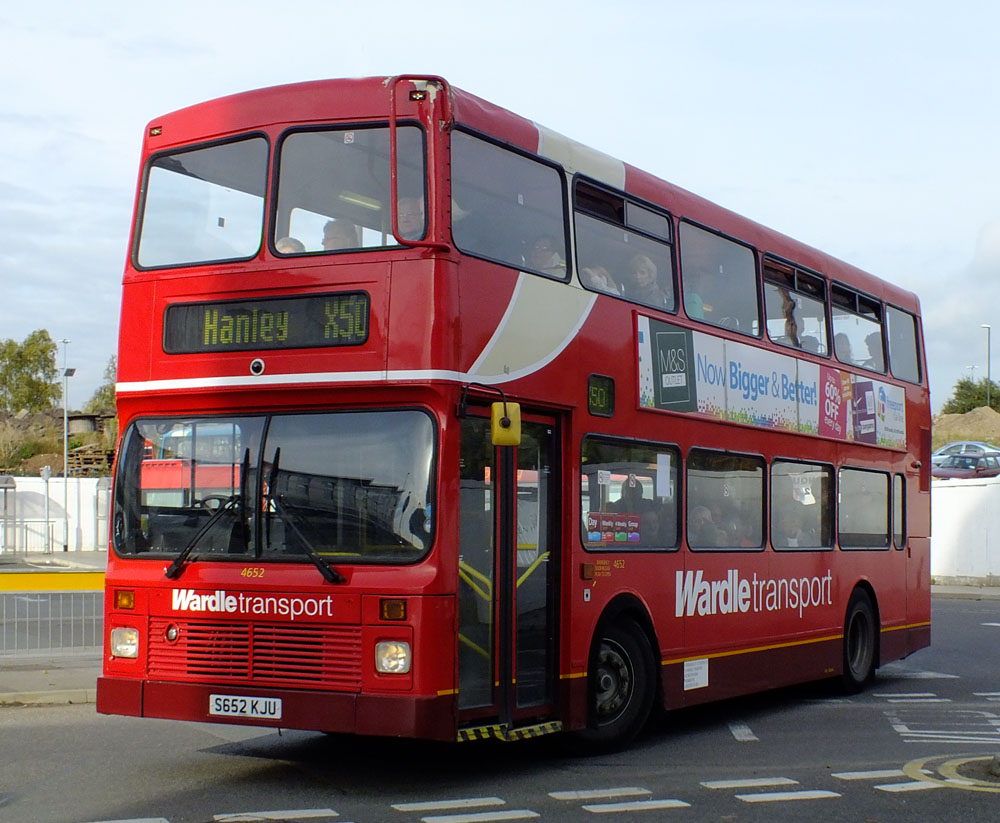
Wardle Transport Northern Counties Palatine bodied Volvo Olympian in 2012

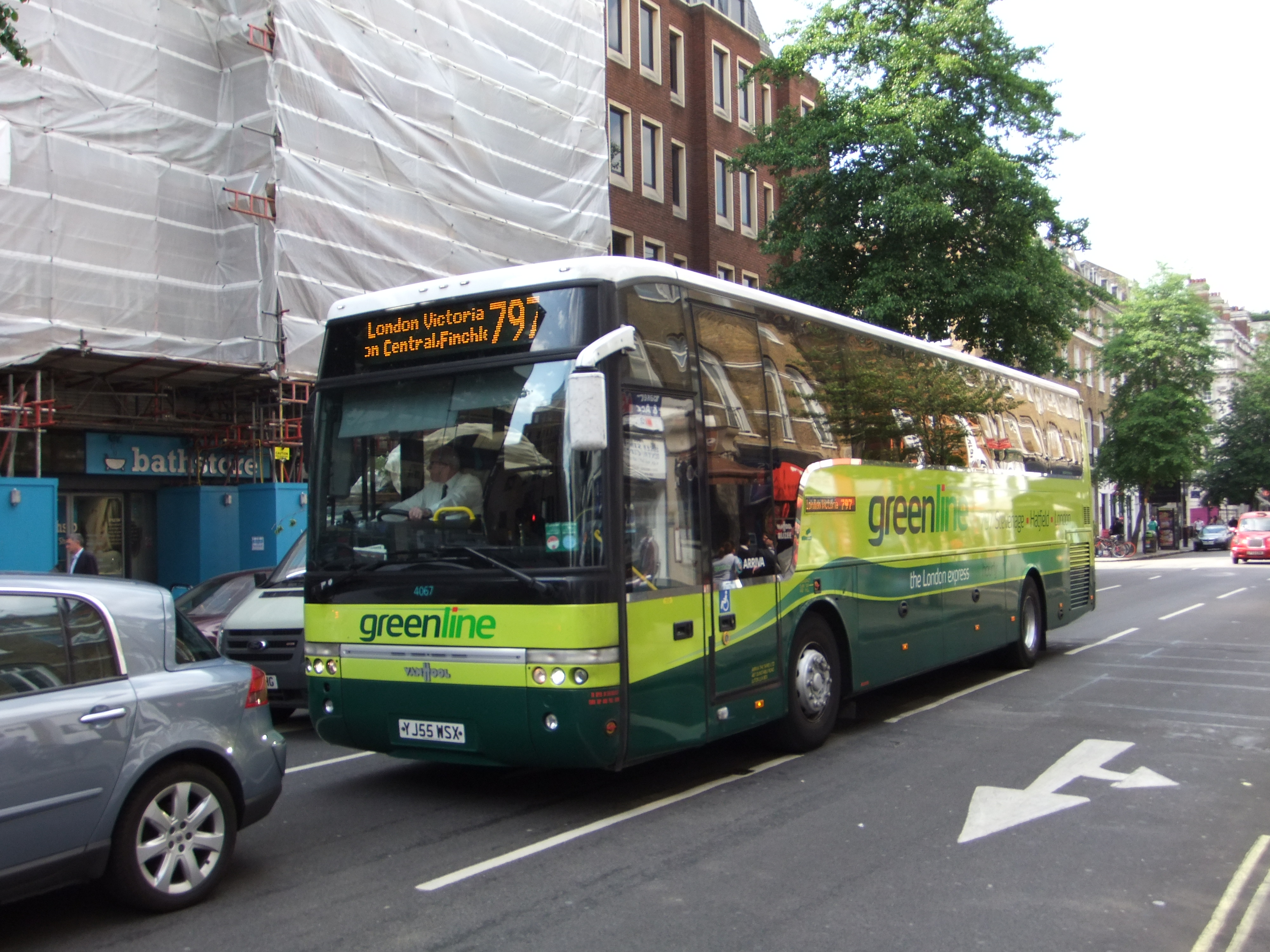
Green Line Van Hool bodied VDL SB4000 in London in 2011

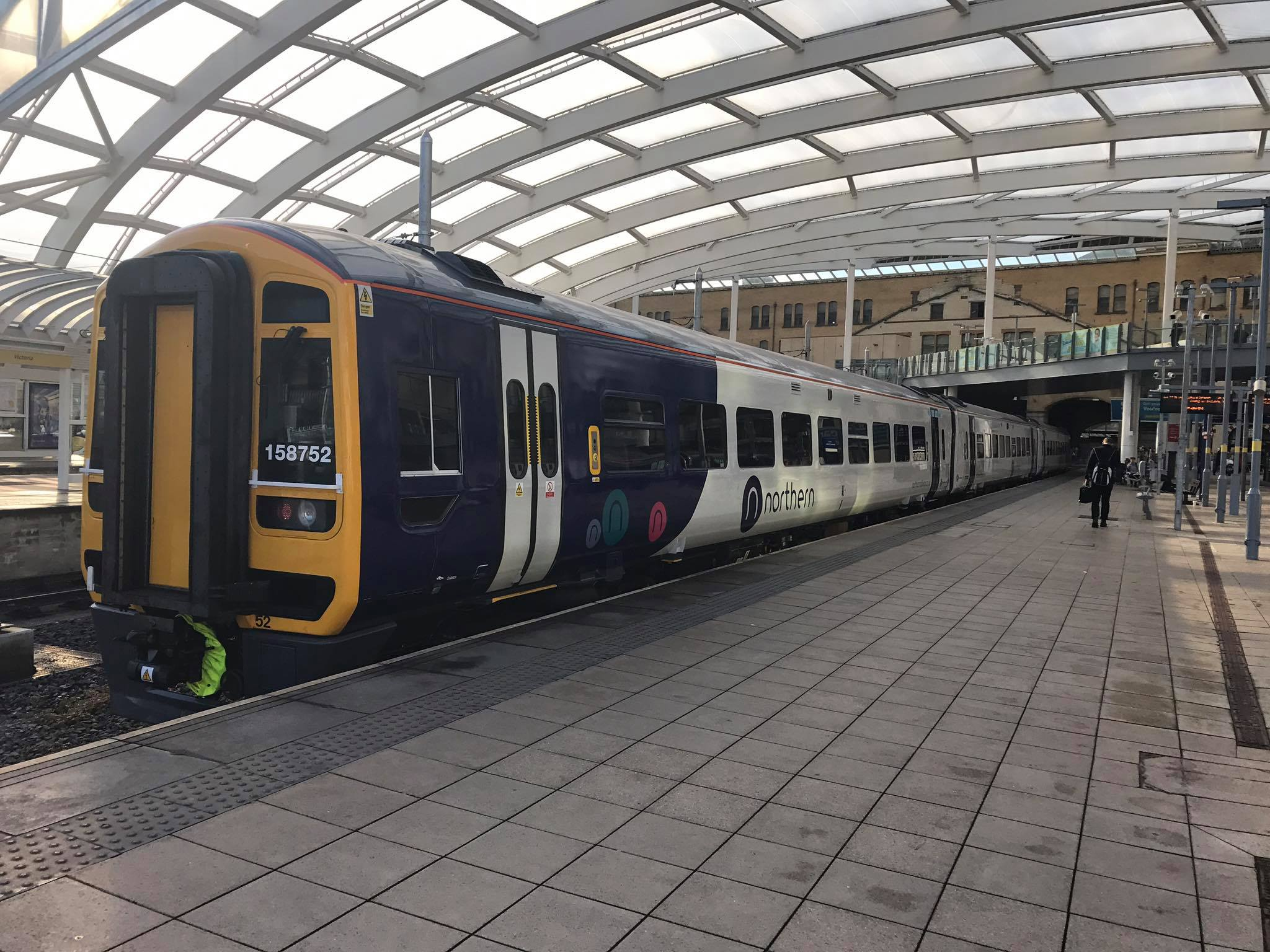
Arriva Rail North Class 158 at Manchester Victoria in 2016

Prior to being rebranded as Arriva in November 1997, the Cowie fleets generally were still trading under their pre-privatisation names with individual liveries. As part of the rebranding the operations were renamed as Arriva Derby, Arriva Fox County etc.

A uniform livery of aquamarine (pantone 321) with a cream coloured semicircle at the front with a yellow skirt and signwriting was adopted. This livery was adopted by most by Arriva's European acquisitions as well as Arriva Trains Northern and Arriva Trains Wales. The same livery was applied to the Arriva London fleet albeit with red in lieu of aquamarine to comply with a Transport for London requirement for buses to be 80% red. London vehicles are now painted all-over red to comply with Transport for London's amended requirements.

In the mid-2000s, an aquamarine livery with less cream, a dark blue skirt and yellow stripe was adopted for some longer distance services in the United Kingdom. The first buses to carry this new style were 3 Northern Counties Palatine II DAF DB250s based at the Arriva Southern Counties Gillingham garage for routes 700/701 between Medway Towns and Bluewater. Dubbed the interurban livery, in September 2009 it was decided to adopt this livery as standard for all UK buses. Most European operations retain the old livery, although some Czech buses have also received it. In December 2008 Arriva Trains Wales unveiled a dark blue livery on its Mark 2 carriages, this has since been adopted as its standard livery.

Exceptions to standard livery include:

- Arriva Denmark – Yellow and blue (following Sydttrafik, Midttrafik, Nordjyllands Trafikselskab and some local train companies as well and Movias own colour schemes)
- Arriva London – red livery specified by Transport for London
- Arriva Mobility Solutions (Slovakia) – red livery according to IDS BK specifications
- Arriva Rail London – white, orange & blue livery specified by Transport for London
- Arriva Rail North – white & blue livery specified by Department for Transport
- Arriva Stockholm – Red and blue specified by SL
- Chiltern Railways – existing white & blue livery retained, superseded in 2013 by a white & silver livery
- CrossCountry – maroon, grey & pink
- Grand Central – existing black & orange livery retained
- Green Line Coaches – light & dark green
- Glasgow Flyer – white, green & black
- New Enterprise Coaches – white with red logos
- Spurt – red and white
- VT-Arriva, Hungary – light blue
- Wardle Transport – Arriva livery but with red in lieu of aquamarine
- Yorkshire Tiger – Yorkshire Tiger branded vehicles are mainly orange with the exception of Tiger Blue and Flying Tiger which are blue
- Transportes Sul do Tejo – TST vehicles are mainly white with some having yellow and blue stripes, others only blue stripes and the Sulfertagus service having a red transition to blue on a mainly white livery.

=== Sapphire premium services ===
Arriva has introduced the Sapphire brand for premium services in the UK, in similar fashion to Stagecoach Gold with buses fitted with leather seats and WiFi.

== Suppliers ==
Arriva Bus & Coach was a bus and coach dealership based in Gomersal, England. Established in 1951 as Stanley Hughes, it was purchased by the Paul Sykes Group in 1982 and the Cowie Group in 1988. It sold primarily Plaxton bodied coaches, and was a DAF dealer. Hughes DAF was rebranded to Arriva Bus & Coach in 1998 and is now the main dealer for Temsa and Van Hool. coaches in the UK as well as more recently Ilesbus.

In June 2020, it was announced the company would restructure to significantly downsize. During January 2021, it was announced Arriva Bus & Coach would close on 31 March 2021.
