= Poznań Garbary railway station =

Railway station in Poznań, Poland

Poznań Garbary
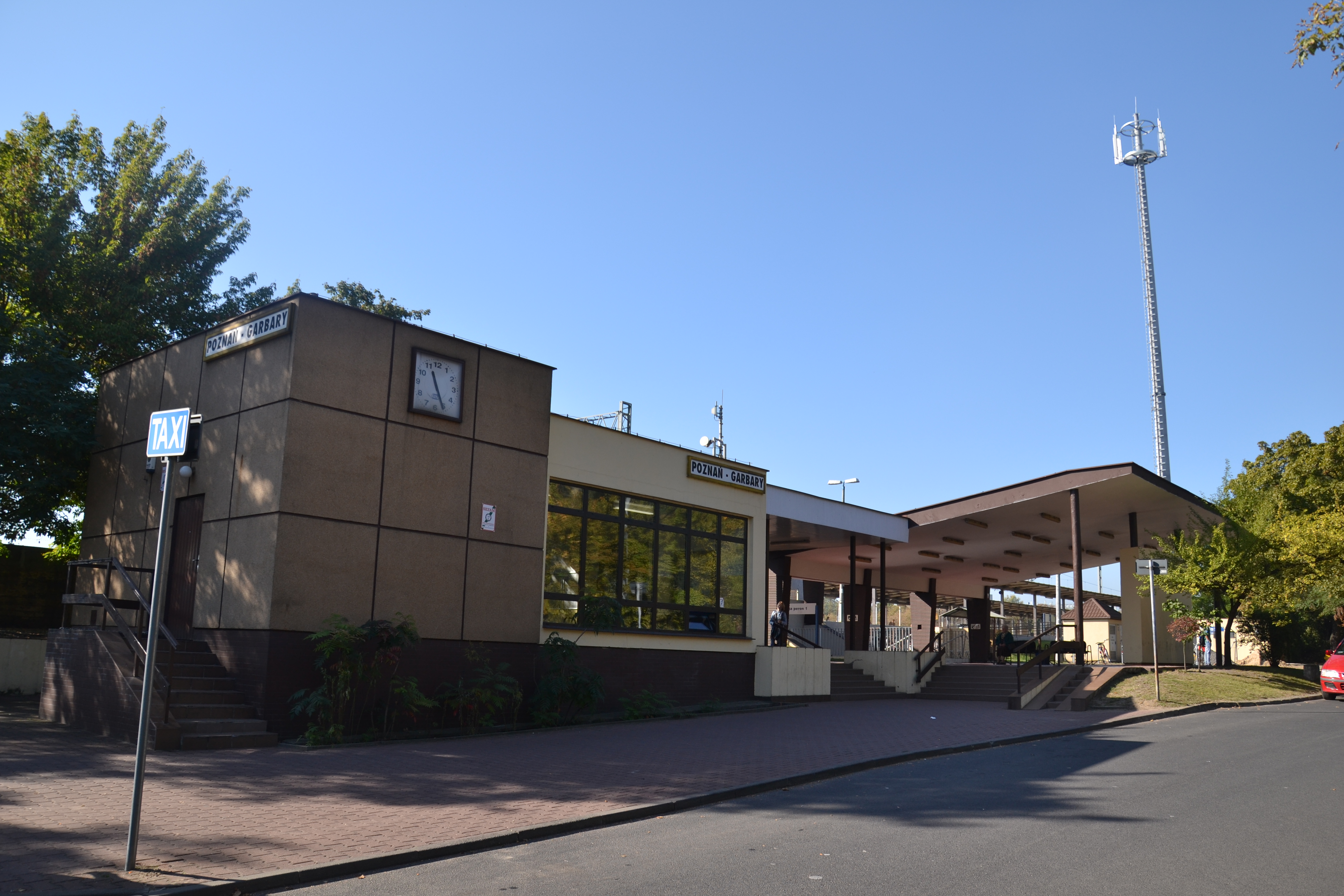
- Poznań Garbary railway station

General information
- Location: Poznań, Greater Poland Voivodeship; Poland
- Coordinates: 52°24′58″N 16°56′18″E
- System: Railway Station
- Operator: Polregio; Greater Poland Railways
- Lines: Warsaw–Kunowice railway Poznań–Skandawa railway Poznań–Bydgoszcz railway
- Platforms: 2
- Tracks: 2

History
- Opened: 1888; 138 years ago
Location
- Location within Poland Location within Greater Poland Voivodeship

Poznań Garbary railway station is a railway station serving the Garbary area in the city of Poznań, in the Greater Poland Voivodeship, Poland. The station is located on the Warsaw–Kunowice railway, Poznań–Skandawa railway and Poznań–Bydgoszcz railway. The train services are operated by Polregio and Greater Poland Railways.

== History ==
The station was damaged during World War II and was rebuilt in 1946. The station used to be known as Poznań Tama Garbary.

== Modernisation ==
The station was modernised in 2008, which included the installation of lifts, shelters on the platform and a wide tunnel under the tracks. New platforms were built which met European standards.

== Train services ==
The station is served by the following service(s):

- Regional services (R) Poznan - Gniezno - Mogilno - Inowroclaw - Bydgoszcz
- Regional services (R) Poznan - Gniezno - Mogilno - Inowroclaw - Torun
- Regional services (R) Leszno - Poznan
- Regional services (KW) Poznan - Wrzesnia - Konin - Kutno
- Regional services (KW) Poznan - Gniezno
- Regional services (KW) Poznan - Murowana Goślina - Wągrowiec - Gołańcz

Preceding station	Polregio	Following station
Poznań Główny Terminus	PR	Poznań Wschód towards Bydgoszcz Główna
Poznań Główny Terminus	PR	Poznań Wschód towards Toruń Główny
Poznań Główny towards Leszno	PR	Poznań Wschód towards Poznań Antoninek
Preceding station	KW	Following station
Poznań Główny Terminus	Poznań - Kutno	Poznań Wschód towards Kutno
Poznań Główny Terminus	Poznań - Mogilno	Poznań Wschód towards Mogilno
Poznań Główny Terminus	Poznań - Gołańcz	Poznań Wschód towards Gołańcz
Preceding station	Poznań Metropolitan Railway	Following station
Poznań Główny railway station towards Kościan	PKM1	Poznań Wschód towards Gniezno
Poznań Główny railway station towards Nowy Tomyśl	PKM2	Poznań Wschód towards Września
Poznań Główny railway station towards Grodzisk Wielkopolski	PKM3	Poznań Wschód towards Wągrowiec

== Bus services ==
- 147
- 151
- 160
- 163
- 167
- 174
- 183
- 190
- 911
