= Poznań Wschód railway station =

Railway station in Poznań, Poland

Poznań Wschód
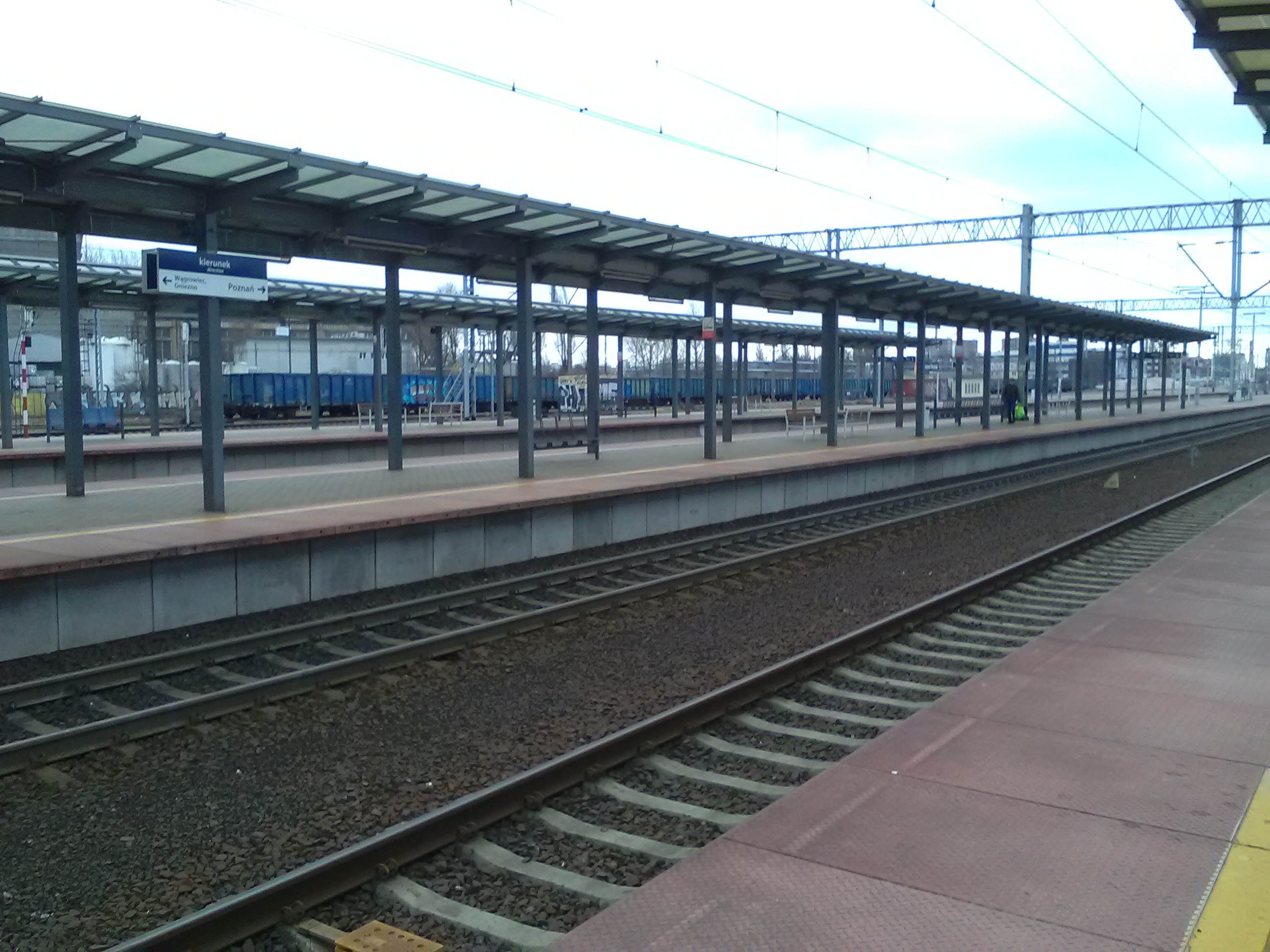
- Poznań Wschód railway station

General information
- Location: Poznań, Greater Poland Voivodeship; Poland
- Coordinates: 52°25′09″N 16°58′26″E
- System: Railway Station
- Operator: Polregio; Greater Poland Railways
- Lines: Warsaw–Kunowice railway Poznań–Skandawa railway Poznań–Bydgoszcz railway
- Platforms: 5

Services
Preceding station	Polregio	Following station
Poznań Garbary towards Poznań Główny	PR	Ligowiec towards Bydgoszcz Główna
Poznań Garbary towards Poznań Główny	PR	Ligowiec towards Toruń Główny
Poznań Garbary towards Leszno	PR	Poznań Antoninek Terminus
Preceding station	KW	Following station
Poznań Garbary towards Poznań Główny	Poznań - Kutno	Poznań Antoninek towards Kutno
Poznań Garbary towards Poznań Główny	Poznań - Mogilno	Ligowiec towards Mogilno
Poznań Garbary towards Poznań Główny	Poznań - Gołańcz	Poznań Karolin towards Gołańcz
Preceding station	Poznań Metropolitan Railway	Following station
Poznań Garbary towards Kościan	PKM1	Ligowiec towards Gniezno
Poznań Garbary towards Nowy Tomyśl	PKM2	Poznań Antoninek towards Września
Poznań Garbary towards Grodzisk Wielkopolski	PKM3	Poznań Karolin towards Wągrowiec
Location
- Location within Poland Location within Greater Poland Voivodeship

Poznań Wschód railway station (English: Poznań East) is a railway station serving the north east of the city of Poznań, in the Greater Poland Voivodeship, Poland. The station is located at the junction of the Warsaw–Kunowice railway, Poznań–Skandawa railway, and Poznań–Bydgoszcz railway. The train services are operated by Polregio and Greater Poland Railways.

== History ==
The station used to be known as Poznań Główna after the neighbourhood it lies in, however this caused confusion with the similarly named Poznań Główny railway station, the main station of the city. The station was therefore renamed Poznań Wschodni and later changed to its current name of Poznań Wschod.

== Train services ==
The station is served by the following service(s):

- Regional services (R) Poznan - Gniezno - Mogilno - Inowroclaw - Bydgoszcz
- Regional services (R) Poznan - Gniezno - Mogilno - Inowroclaw - Torun
- Regional services (R) Leszno - Poznan
- Regional services (KW) Poznan - Wrzesnia - Konin - Kutno
- Regional services (KW) Poznan - Gniezno
- Regional services (KW) Poznan - Murowana Goślina - Wągrowiec - Gołańcz
