= Krylovo =

Krylovo (Russian: Крылово) is the name of several rural localities in Russia:

- Krylovo, Kaliningrad Oblast, rural locality (a settlement) in Pravdinsk Urban Okrug, Pravdinsky District, Kaliningrad Oblast
- Krylovo, Vladimir Oblast, a rural locality (a village) in Kupriyanovskoye Rural Settlement, Gorokhovetsky District, Vladimir Oblast
- Krylovo, Cherepovetsky District, Vologda Oblast, a rural locality (a village) in Voskresenskoye Rural Settlement, Cherepovetsky District, Vologda Oblast
- Krylovo, Ust-Kubinsky District, Vologda Oblast, a rural locality (a village) in Troitskoye Rural Settlement, Ust-Kubinsky District, Vologda Oblast
