= Poznań Antoninek railway station =

Railway station in Poznań, Poland

Poznań Antoninek
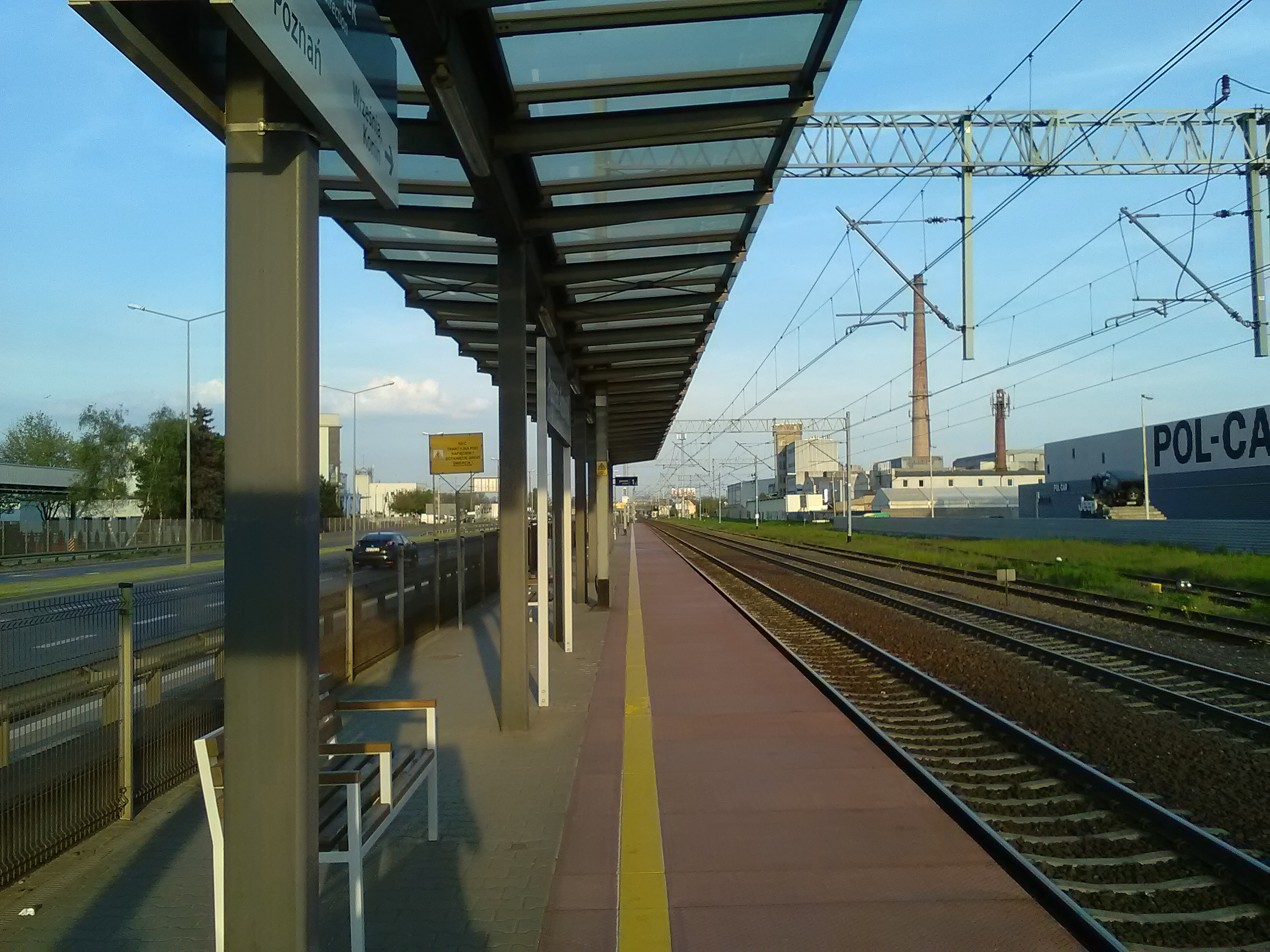
- Poznań Antoninek railway station platform

General information
- Location: Poznań, Greater Poland Voivodeship; Poland
- Coordinates: 52°24′34″N 17°01′49″E
- System: Railway Station
- Operator: Polregio; Greater Poland Railways
- Line: Warsaw–Kunowice railway
- Platforms: 2
- Tracks: 2

Services
Preceding station	Polregio	Following station
Poznań Wschód towards Leszno	PR	Terminus
Preceding station	KW	Following station
Poznań Wschód towards Poznań Główny	Poznań - Kutno	Swarzędz towards Kutno
Preceding station	Poznań Metropolitan Railway	Following station
Poznań Wschód towards Nowy Tomyśl	PKM2	Swarzędz towards Września
Location
- Location within Poland Location within Greater Poland Voivodeship

Poznań Antoninek railway station is a railway station serving the city of Poznań, in the Greater Poland Voivodeship, Poland. The station is located on the Warsaw–Kunowice railway. The train services are operated by Polregio and Greater Poland Railways.

== Train services ==
The station is served by the following service(s):

- Regional services (R) Leszno - Poznan
- Regional services (KW) Poznan - Wrzesnia - Konin - Kutno

== Bus services ==
- 66 (Poznan, Rondo Rataje - Os. Lecha - Os. Rusa - Poznan Antoninek - Zielniec)
