= Łódź Marysin railway station =

Railway station located in city of Łódź, in Bałuty district, Poland

Coordinates: 51°48′01″N 19°29′08.85″E

Łódź Marysin
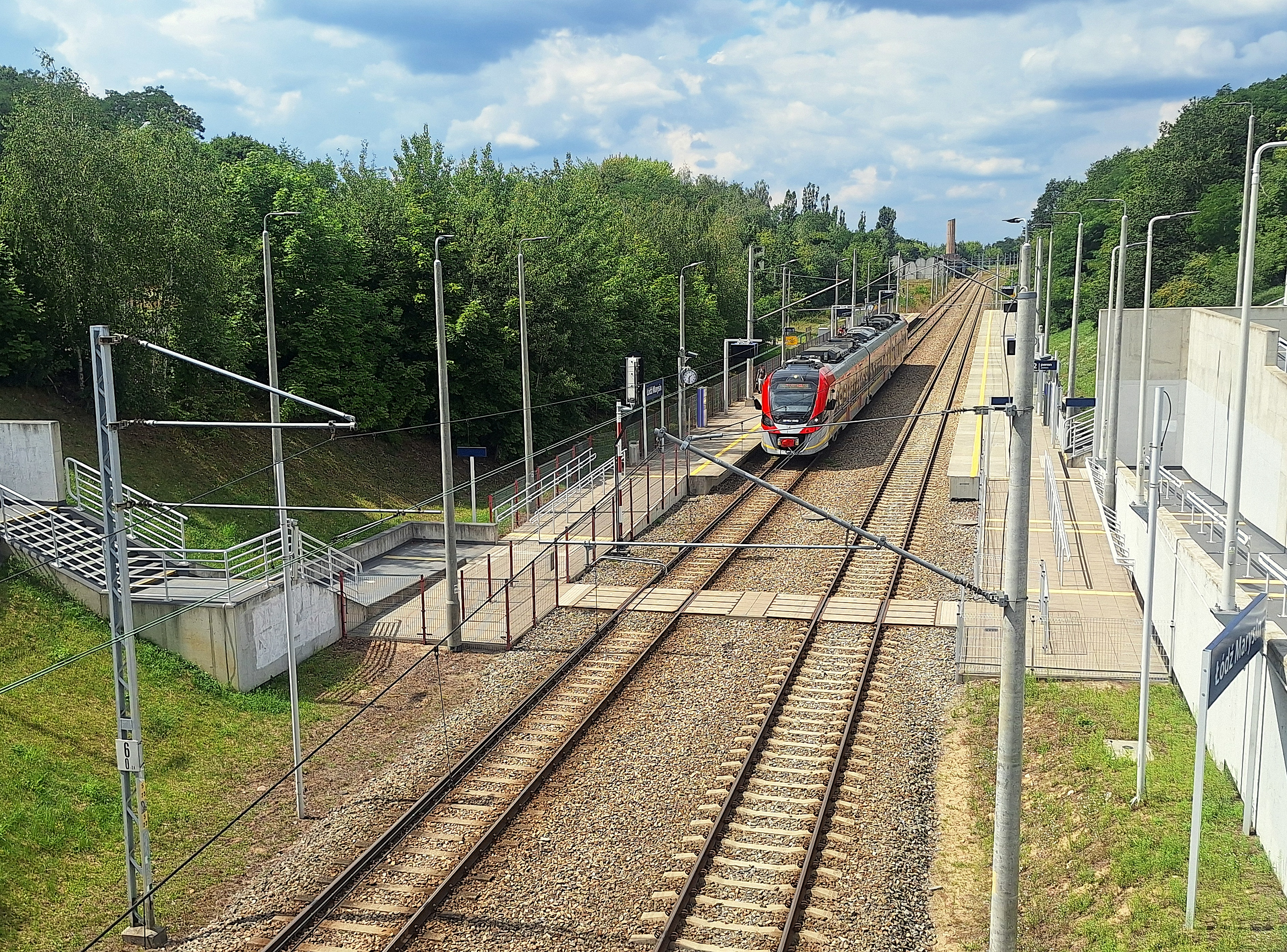

General information
- Location: Łódź, Bałuty district Poland
- System: Commuter Station
- Lines: Łódź Circular Line; 16 Łódź–Kutno railway
- Platforms: 2
- Tracks: 2

Construction
- Accessible: elevator

History
- Opened: 1 September 2014
- Rebuilt: 30 August 2020

Services
Preceding station	ŁKA	Following station
Łódź Stoki towards Łódź Fabryczna	Łódź Widzew - Zgierz via Stoki	Łódź Warszawska towards Zgierz
Location

Łódź Marysin is a commuter railway station located in city of Łódź, in Bałuty district, Poland, on a loop line between Łódź Widzew and Zgierz stations, in the neighborhood of the former Radegast station. The station was constructed as part of the Łódź Commuter Railway and serves only ŁKA trains running from Łódź to Zgierz.

On 20 October 2019 the station was closed and since then is being expanded by rebuilding it into passing loop to increase the traffic rate on the line. Partial reopening of station took place in January 2020 after completion of works on the track switches. New platform was brought into service on 30 August 2020.

== Future plans ==
Another plan includes building a tram terminus in direct vicinity of the station (currently there is no bus or tram stop located nearby).
