= Łódź Circular Line =

The Łódź Circular Line is a complex of railway lines and connectors in the city of Łódź, Poland, together forming the ring surrounding the central part of the city.

== History ==
Earliest plans of creating the circular railway surrounding the city of Łódź were dated with late 1880s, and were mostly made for freight purposes to connect textile factories. The earliest section to be actually built was done as part of Warsaw-Kalisz railway in 1900-1902 - it ran between Zgierz and Łódź Kaliska stations. One year later a southern section from Widzew to Kaliska station through Chojny was put into service. During World War I the track gauge was changed from 1,524 mm (5 ft) into standard 1,435 mm (4 ft 8 1/2 in).

In 1926 a railway from Widzew to Zgierz through Bałuty was built, though the station was built 2 years later and the section was put into service in 1931.

During World War II Łódź was annexed by Germany into Reichsgau Wartheland and renamed into Litzmannstadt. In 1940-1941, extensively using the forced labourers from the ghetto, a marshalling yard in the area of Olechów was built, along with the tracks to Chojny and Widzew stations.

In 1950s the first plans of electrifying the railways in Łódź were brought up. In 1951 a station was opened in Żabieniec, and in 1958 the sections from Kaliska to Widzew stations, along with connectors from Chojny and Olechów stations, were electrified. In 1965 the section from Łódź Kaliska to Zgierz was electrified, and 4 years later electrification was done on Zgierz-Widzew section.

New stops were opened in 1970s: in Stoki and Arturówek neighbourhoods, and new platforms of Łódź Żabieniec station were made. The former were closed down in late 1980s and early 1990s. At the same time some platforms within the area of Olechów freight station were excluded from passenger service.

In 2010 ŁKA company was established, and subsequently a plan to create a commuter service on the circular line was brought up. First new stopping points: Radogoszcz Zachód, Pabianicka and Dąbrowa, were opened in 2013. One year later a new platform was opened in Marysin neighbourhood, in a close proximity of defunct Radegast station, which was turned into a memorial site, as well as new platforms in Stoki and Arturówek were built. In 2019 the stopping points near Olechów freight station were refurbished and brought into service, while a construction of new stopping points: Warszawska and Radogoszcz Wschód, as well as reconstruction of Marysin station has begun.

== Railways and passenger stations running within the path of circular line ==
=== Partially ===
- 15 Łódź–Bednary railway:
  - Zgierz
  - Łódź Radogoszcz Zachód
  - Łódź Żabieniec
  - Łódź Kaliska - terminus
- 16 Łódź–Kutno railway
  - Łódź Widzew - terminus
  - Łódź Stoki
  - Łódź Marysin
  - Łódź Arturówek
  - Zgierz
- 25 Łódź–Dębica railway
  - Łódź Kaliska - terminus
  - Łódź Pabianicka
  - Łódź Chojny
  - Łódź Olechów Wiadukt
  - Łódź Olechów Zachód
  - Łódź Olechów Wschód

=== Entirely ===
- 540 Chojny - Widzew
  - Łódź Chojny - terminus
  - Łódź Dąbrowa
  - Łódź Widzew - terminus
- 541 Olechów - Widzew
  - Łódź Olechów Wschód - terminus
  - Łódź Widzew - terminus

== Services ==
Łódź Agglomeration Railway is responsible for servicing the entirety of circular line, although they do not run a dedicated service - instead trains from selected relations run along the railway. Mostly occupied section of the circle is the one between Kaliska and Widzew stations, served by selected trains bound to Kutno, Łowicz and Sieradz. Plans for a dedicated service for railway ring line ŁKA-0 are expected to materialise after completion of western cross-city tunnel between Kaliska and Fabryczna stations.

PolRegio utilises two sections of the circular railway: Zgierz-Kaliska (for Łódź-Toruń services) and Kaliska-Widzew sections (for Łódź-Opoczno and selected Łódź-Częstochowa services).

PKP Intercity services are mostly present at Widzew-Kaliska sections (Warsaw-Wrocław services, stopping at Chojny station only, then bypassing Kaliska station with a connector line) and Zgierz-Widzew section (Gdynia-Katowice services, no stopping in between those stations).
