= Łęczyca railway station =

Railway station in Łęczyca, Poland

Łęczyca
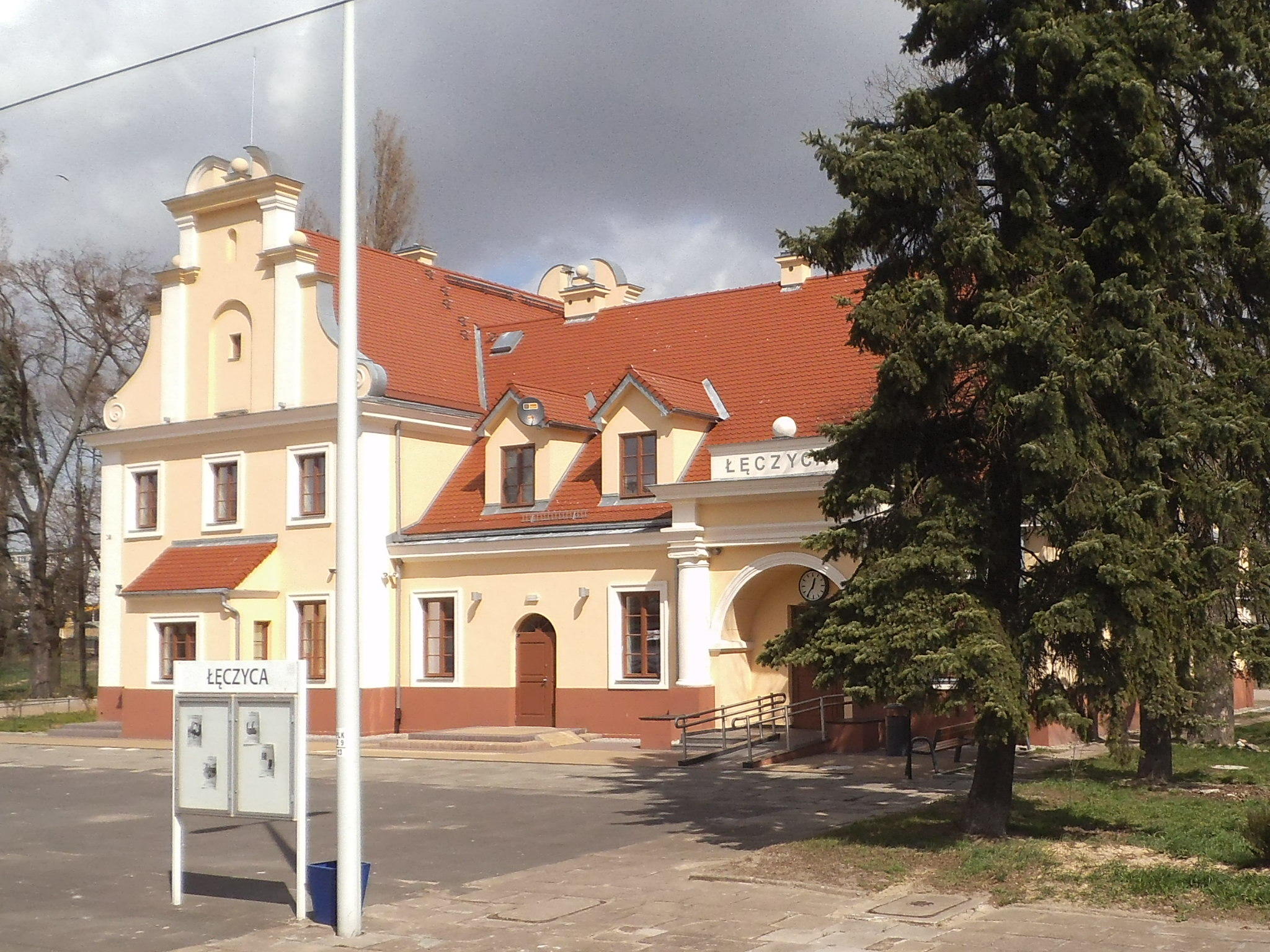
- Main building of the station

General information
- Location: Łęczyca, Łódź Voivodeship; Poland
- Coordinates: 52°02′58″N 19°11′37″E
- System: Local Station
- Owner: Polish State Railways
- Line: 16 Łódź–Kutno railway
- Platforms: 3
- Tracks: 3

History
- Opened: 1925
- Electrified: 1981
- Former names: Lentschütz (1941-45)

Passengers
- 2018: 200 - 299

Services
Preceding station	PKP Intercity	Following station
Kutno towards Gdynia Główna	IC	Ozorków towards Łódź Fabryczna or Bielsko-Biała Główna
Ozorków towards Katowice	TLK	Kutno towards Gdynia Główna
Preceding station	Polregio	Following station
Gawrony towards Toruń Główny	PR	Sierpów towards Łódź Kaliska
Preceding station	ŁKA	Following station
Gawrony towards Kutno	Łódź - Kutno	Sierpów towards Łódź Kaliska
Location

Łęczyca station is a railway station located in the Polish town of Łęczyca, Łódź Voivodeship. It serves mainly regional and commuter traffic between Łódź and Kutno, as well as intercity services between Gdynia and Katowice.

It opened in 1925 as a part of Łódź–Kutno railway. The main building resembles mansion architecture, used among other local railway stations built around early 1920's. The station serves the branch line leading to the military base near Leżnica Wielka.

== Train services ==
The station is served by the following services:

- Intercity services (IC) Łódź Fabryczna — Bydgoszcz — Gdynia Główna
- Intercity services (IC) Gdynia - Gdańsk - Bydgoszcz - Toruń - Kutno - Łódź - Częstochowa - Katowice - Bielsko-Biała
- Intercity services (TLK) Gdynia Główna — Bydgoszcz/Grudziądz — Łódź — Katowice
