= Łódź Stoki railway station =

Railway station in Poland

Coordinates: 51°46′36″N 19°30′37″E

Łódź Stoki
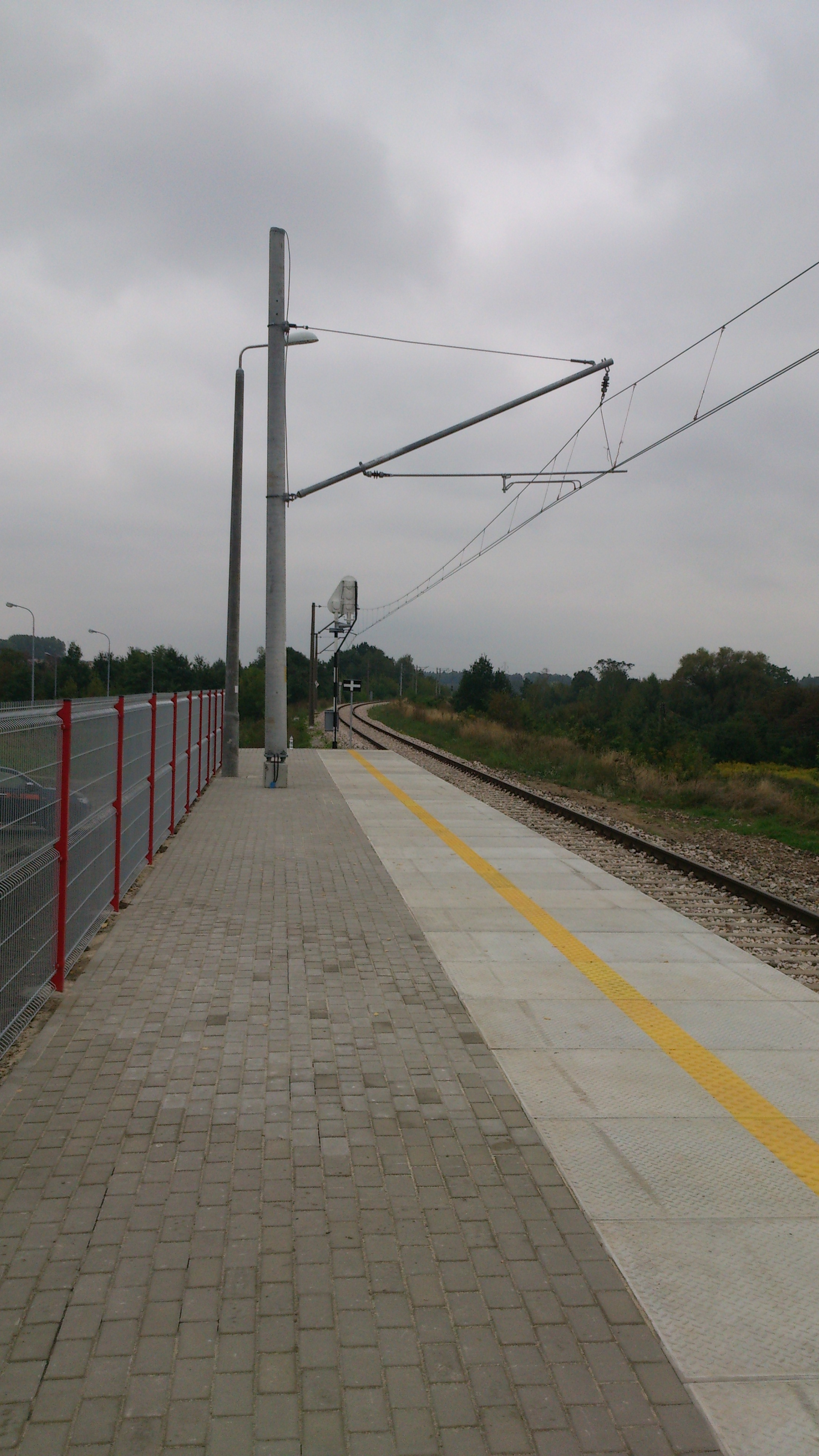
- A platform of the station

General information
- Location: Łódź, Widzew district Poland
- System: Commuter Station
- Lines: Łódź Circular Line; 16 Łódź–Kutno railway
- Platforms: 1
- Tracks: 1

History
- Opened: 1973; 53 years ago
- Rebuilt: 2014; 12 years ago

Services
Preceding station	ŁKA	Following station
Łódź Widzew towards Łódź Fabryczna	Łódź Widzew - Zgierz via Stoki	Łódź Marysin towards Zgierz
Location

Łódź Stoki is a commuter station located in the city of Łódź, in Widzew district, on a circular line between Łódź Widzew and Zgierz stations. Initially opened in 1973, it was relocated and built from scratch in 2014 as part of Łódź Commuter Railway project, to provide accessibility to nearby medical center and academic estates.
