= Łódź Arturówek railway station =

Railway station in Poland

Coordinates: 51°48′56.5″N 19°27′22.8″E

Łódź Arturówek

General information
- Location: Łódź, Bałuty district Poland
- System: Commuter Station
- Lines: Łódź Circular Line; 16 Łódź–Kutno railway
- Platforms: 1
- Tracks: 1

History
- Opened: 1972
- Rebuilt: 2014

Services
Preceding station	ŁKA	Following station
Łódź Warszawska towards Łódź Fabryczna	Łódź Widzew - Zgierz via Stoki	Łódź Radogoszcz Wschód towards Zgierz
Location

Łódź Arturówek is a commuter railway station located in the city of Łódź, Poland, in Bałuty district, in the neighbourhood of Łagiewniki forest, on the circular line between Łódź Widzew and Zgierz stations.

Initially opened in 1972, the station was unused from 1988 until 2014, when it was rebuilt and reopened as part of Łódź Commuter Railway (ŁKA), serving only ŁKA trains from Łódź to Zgierz.
