= Außenarbeitslager Gerdauen =

- Subcamp
- Coordinates: 54°21′39.96″N 21°18′42.12″E
- Location: Zheleznodorozhny, Kaliningrad Oblast

Außenarbeitslager Gerdauen was a subcamp of the Stutthof concentration camp in nowaday's Zheleznodorozhny, Kaliningrad Oblast. Most of the prisoners in the subcamps of the Stutthoff camp contained Jewish women from Hungary and from the Łódź Ghetto, and there were also some Jewish men from Lithuania. While a labor camp rather than a death camp, many people died - of 100 Jewish girls at the camp only three survived the war.

In 1994, Riva Chirurg published an autobiography which discussed her time at Gerdauen, as well as in the Łódź Ghetto, in Auschwitz and in Stutthoff.
