= Skandawa =

- Village
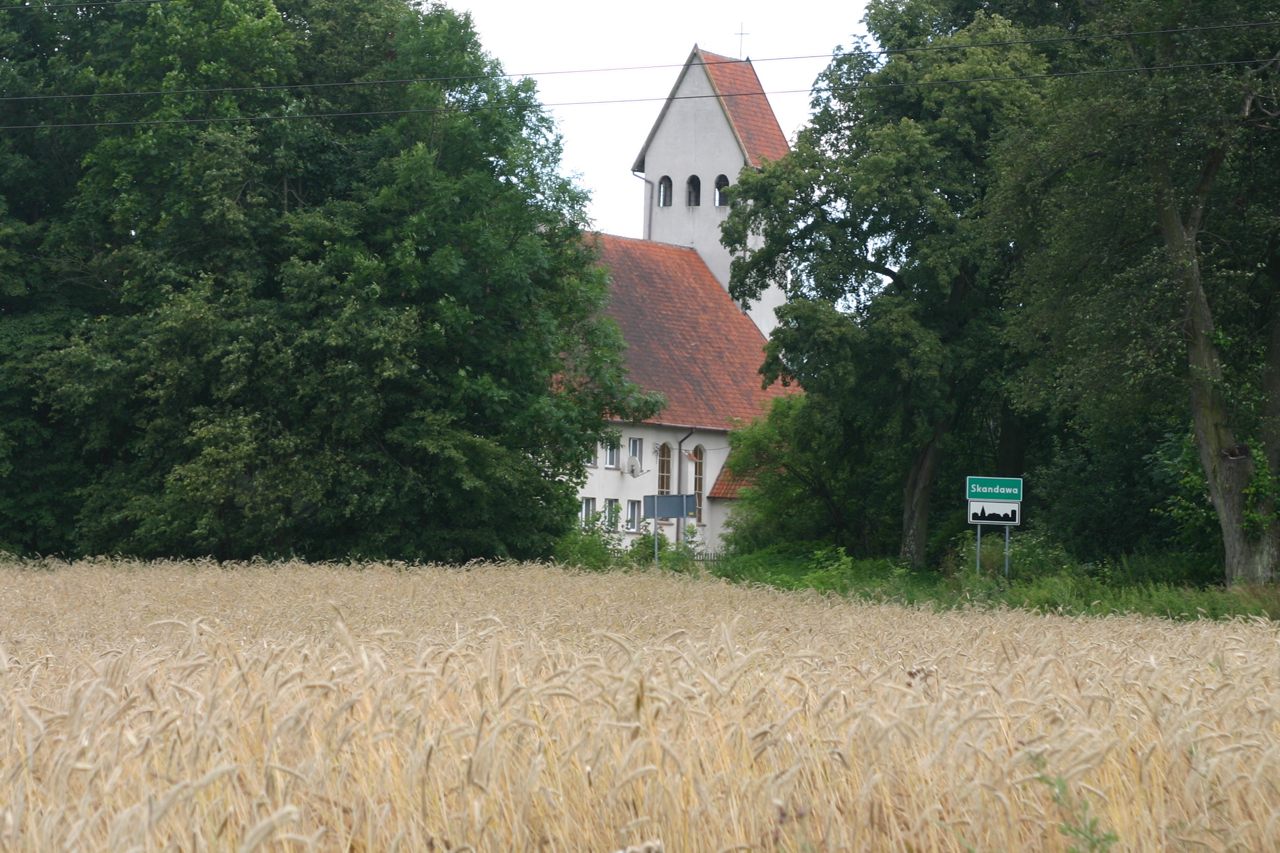
- Saint Adalbert church in Skandawa

- Location within Poland
- Coordinates: 54°16′22″N 21°15′9″E
- Country: Poland
- Voivodeship: Warmian-Masurian
- County: Kętrzyn
- Gmina: Barciany
- Time zone: UTC+1 (CET)
  - Summer (DST): UTC+2 (CEST)
- Vehicle registration: NKE

Skandawa [skanˈdava] is a village in northern Poland, in the administrative district of Gmina Barciany, Kętrzyn County, and the Warmian-Masurian Voivodeship. It is located close to the border with the Kaliningrad Oblast of Russia.

The 390-km-long Line 353 of Polish State Railways (PKP) connects Poznań to Skandawa and the Russian border (8 km (5 mi) north-east of Skandawa and 3 km (2 mi) south-west of Zheleznodorozhny) via Olsztyn and Korsze. Since 2000 the final stretch from Korsze to the border has been a freight-only branch, and the railway station at Korsze (15 km (9 mi) to the south-west) is today Skandawa's nearest passenger facility.
