= Włocławek railway station =

Railway station in Włocławek, Poland

Coordinates: 52.6533°N 19.0592°E

Włocławek
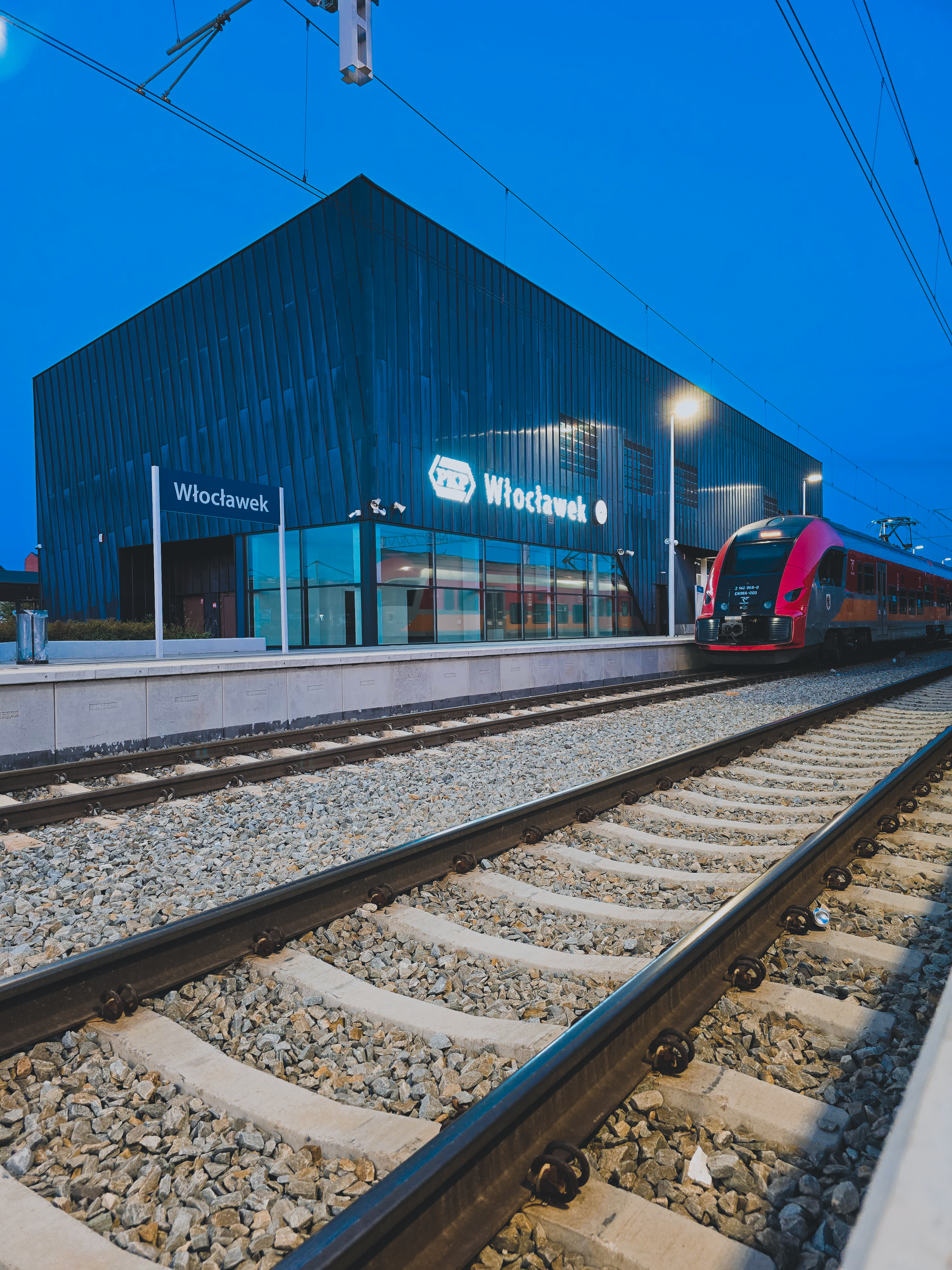
- Włocławek Transfer Center near the main railway station (under construction)

General information
- Location: Włocławek, Kuyavian-Pomeranian Voivodeship; Poland
- System: Railway Station
- Operator: PKP; Polregio
- Line: 18: Kutno–Piła railway
- Platforms: 3

History
- Opened: 1862; 164 years ago
- Rebuilt: 1971-1974
- Former names: Leslau
Location
- Location within Poland

Włocławek railway station is a railway station serving the town of Włocławek, in the Kuyavian-Pomeranian Voivodeship, Poland. The station is located on the Kutno–Piła railway. The train services are operated by PKP and Polregio.

== Train services ==
The station is served by the following services:

- Intercity services Gdynia - Gdansk - Bydgoszcz - Torun - Kutno - Lowicz - Warsaw - Lublin - Rzeszow - Zagorz/Przemysl
- Intercity services Gdynia - Gdansk - Bydgoszcz - Torun - Kutno - Lodz - Czestochowa - Katowice - Bielsko-Biala
- Intercity services Gdynia - Gdansk - Bydgoszcz - Torun - Kutno - Lodz - Czestochowa - Krakow - Zakopane
- Intercity services Kolobrzeg - Pila - Bydgoszcz - Torun - Kutno - Lowicz - Warsaw
- Intercity services Szczecin - Pila - Bydgoszcz - Torun - Kutno - Lowicz - Warsaw - Lublin - Rzeszow - Przemysl
- Intercity services Gorzow Wielkopolskie - Krzyz - Pila - Bydgoszcz - Torun - Kutno - Lowicz - Warsaw
- Regional services (R) Bydgoszcz - Solec Kujawski - Torun - Wloclawek - Kutno

Preceding station	Polregio	Following station
Włocławek Zazamcze towards Bydgoszcz Główna	PR	Warząchewka towards Kutno
