= Krylovo, Kaliningrad Oblast =

Krylovo Крылово
- Rural-type settlement
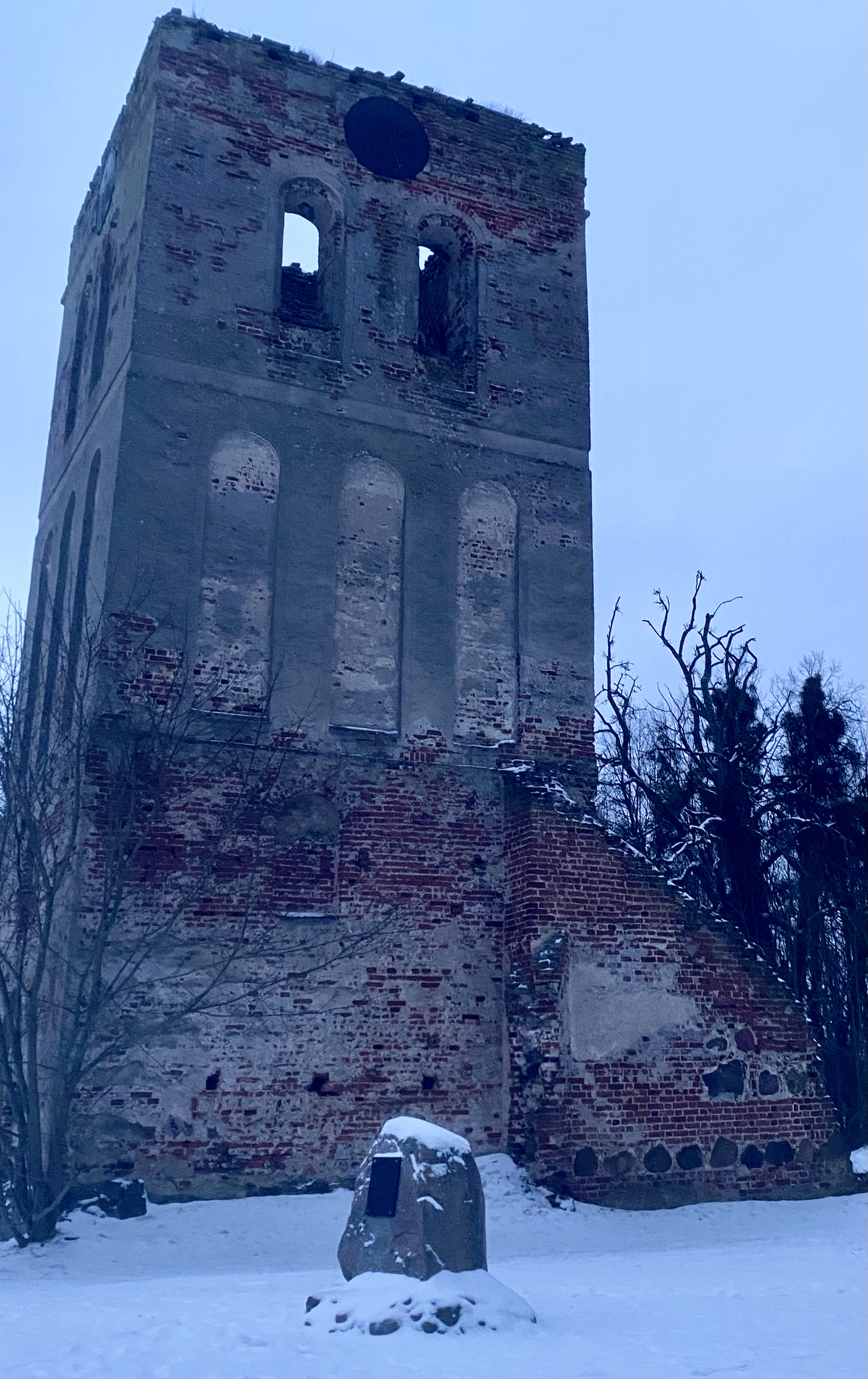
- Old church ruins
- Interactive map of Krylovo
- Location of Krylovo Krylovo (European Russia) Krylovo (Russia)
- Coordinates: 54°20′50″N 21°33′20″E
- Country: Russia
- Federal subject: Kaliningrad Oblast

Population (2010 Census)
  - Total: 785
  - Estimate (2010): 785 (0%)
- Time zone: UTC+2 (MSK–1)
- Postal code: 238414
- OKTMO ID: 27719000331

Krylovo (Note: Russian: Крылово, German: Nordenburg, Polish: Nordembork or Oświn, Lithuanian: Ašvėnai) is a rural locality (a settlement) in Pravdinsk Urban Okrug, Pravdinsky District, Kaliningrad Oblast, Russia, on the border with Poland. Population: 785 (2010 census); 756 (2002 census); 2,291 (1905).

== History ==
The first written mention of what is now Krylovo was placed in the Chronica nova Prutenica ("New Prussian Chronicle") by Wigand of Marburg (completed around 1394) in connection with the raid of pagan Lithuanians, which took place in 1366. In the 15th-century, a small castle of the Teutonic Order was built; later the colonists were settled here.

The foundation of the town of Nordenburg is usually regarded as 1405. On 24 July 1407, the community received Kulm law privileges from the Grand Master of the Teutonic Order Ulrich von Jungingen. In the 1400s, a Dominican monastery was founded, administratively belonging to the Polish Province of the order, which by 1428 was relocated to Gerdauen. In 1454, the town was incorporated to the Kingdom of Poland by King Casimir IV Jagiellon upon the request of the anti-Teutonic Prussian Confederation. Following the peace treaty of 1466, it was a part of Poland as a fief held by the Teutonic Knights. From the 18th century, it was part of the Kingdom of Prussia, and from 1871 also Germany. In the 18th century, there were Polish, Lithuanian and German preachers in the town, however, as a result of Germanisation policies, in the late 19th century church services were held only in German. In 1880, the town had a population of 2,515, mostly employed in agriculture. The town was occupied by Russia during the Seven Years' War in 1757 and during World War I in 1914.

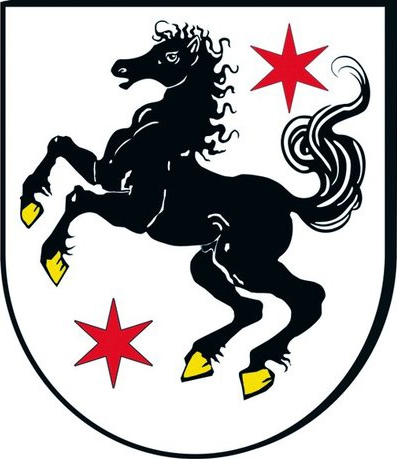
Historic coat of arms

After Germany's defeat in the Second World War, Nordenbork, as it was historically called in Polish, initially passed to Poland, within which it was located in the Gierdawy County. It became its county seat after the unilateral annexation of the former county seat of Gierdawy by the Soviet Union. A local Polish settlement inspectorate was established. After another unilateral redrawing of the border by the Soviets, Nordenbork was also annexed from Poland, so the seat of the Gierdawy County was moved to Skandawa, and eventually the county was disbanded. Immediately after their departure, the old town of Nordenborg was burned down. Nordenburg became part of the Gerdauensky District. On 5 July 1950, Nordenburg was renamed Krylovo. Since December 1962, the village has become part of the Pravdinsky District.

== Administrative and municipal status ==
Within the framework of municipal divisions, since 5 May 2015, the territories of the town of district significance of Pravdinsk, including Krylovo, the urban-type settlement of district significance of Zheleznodorozhny, and of two rural okrugs of Pravdinsky District are incorporated as Pravdinsky Urban Okrug. Before that, the town of district significance was incorporated within Pravdinsky Municipal District as Pravdinskoye Urban Settlement.

== Transport ==
Regional road 27A-028 (ex A 196) coming from Kaliningrad and regional road 27A-042 (ex A 197) coming from Bolshakovo via Chernyakhovsk meet in Krylovo and end at the border with Poland.

Before 1945, Nordenburg was a railway station on the Königsberg (Kaliningrad)–Löwenhagen (Komsomolsk)–Gerdauen (Zheleznodorozhny)–Angerburg (Węgorzewo) railway. In addition, two small railway lines ended in Nordenburg: the line (Insterburg (Chernyakhovsk)–) Warnaschel–Nordenburg of the Insterburg small railways and the line (Rastenburg (Kętrzyn)–) Barten (Barciany)–Nordenburg of the Rastenburg small railways. Rail transport no longer exists in Krylovo.

The water tower at the train station was renovated in 2020.

== Demographics ==
Historical population
Year	Pop.	±%
1880	2,515	—
1905	2,291	−8.9%
2002	756	−67.0%
2010	785	+3.8%
2021	814	+3.7%

Distribution of the population by ethnicity according to the 2021 census:

	percent
Russians	64.62%
Armenians	8.35%
Germans	2.09%
Belarusians	1.11%
Ukrainians	0.61%
refused answer or no data	21.99%
