= Września railway station =

Railway station in Września, Poland

Września
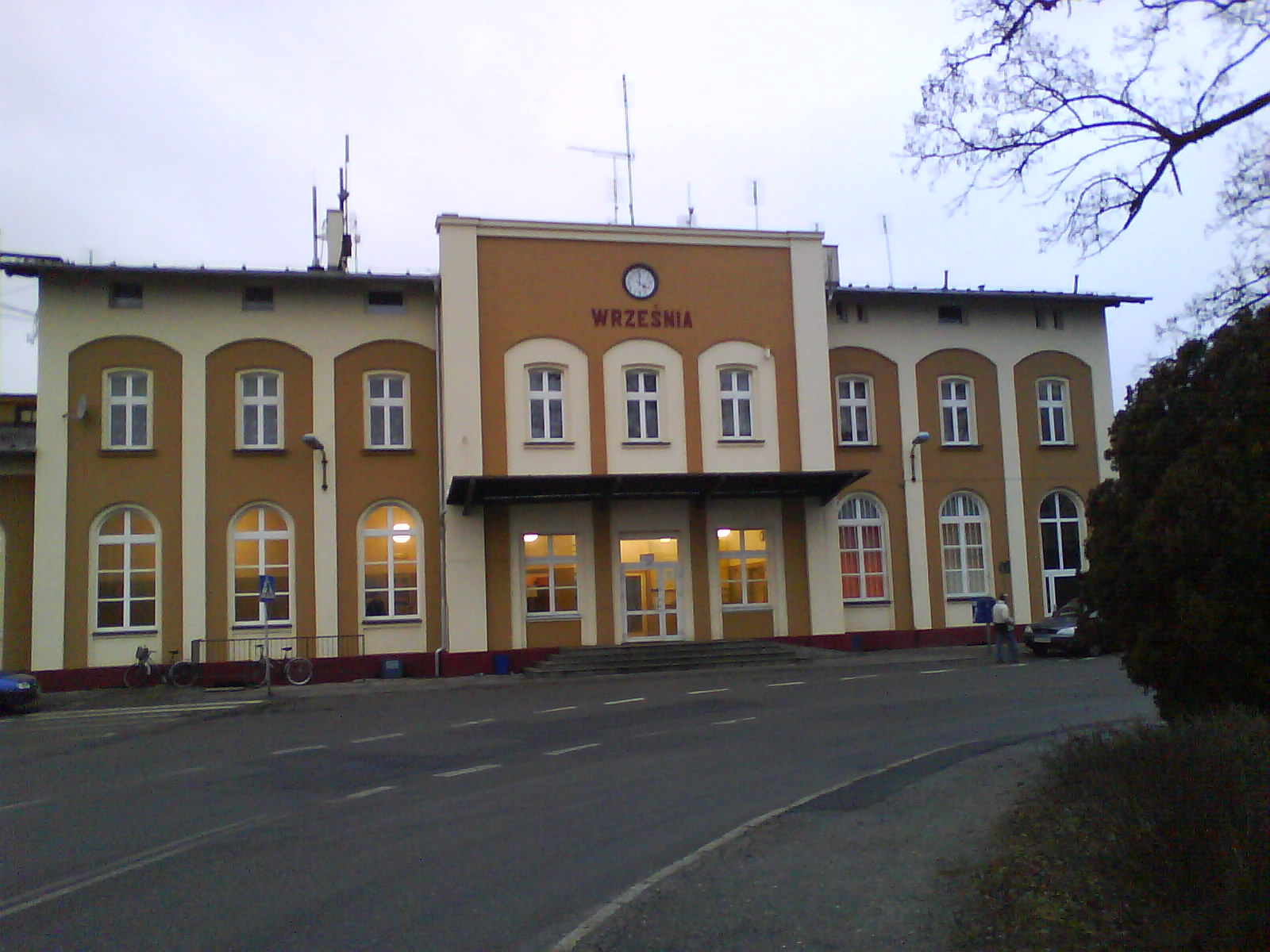
- Września railway station in 2008

General information
- Location: Września, Greater Poland Voivodeship; Poland
- Coordinates: 52°19′41″N 17°33′21″E
- Operator: PKP; Greater Poland Railways
- Lines: Warsaw–Kunowice railway Oleśnica–Chojnice railway
- Platforms: 5

History
- Opened: 30 June 1875
Services
| Preceding station | KW | Following station |
|---|---|---|
| Podstolice towards Poznań Główny | Poznań - Kutno | Gutowo Wielkopolskie towards Kutno |
| Marzenin towards Gniezno | Gniezno - Krotoszyn | Chwalibogowo towards Krotoszyn |
| Preceding station | Poznań Metropolitan Railway | Following station |
| Podstolice towards Nowy Tomyśl | PKM2 | Terminus |
Location
- Location within Poland Location within Greater Poland Voivodeship

Września railway station (German: Wreschen) is a railway station serving the town of Września, in the Greater Poland Voivodeship, Poland. The station is located on the Warsaw–Kunowice railway and Oleśnica–Chojnice railway. The train services are operated by PKP and Greater Poland Railways.

The station is categorized as a grade D station. In the 1960s the station's red brick structure was plastered and repainted in beige, and the inside was completely renovated. The renovation of the façade was undertaken in December 2008. In the past, the railway station used to have a water tower.

Railway line number 3 between Warsaw, Poznań and Kunowice passes about 1.5 km north of Września station. The station is located on a branch of this line which serves the station. The station's switchboards control connections of the number 807 and 808 lines.

Train services between Gniezno, Września and Jarocin were suspended in December 2012, but they were reinstated in June 2018.

== Train services ==
The station is served by the following service(s):

- Intercity services Szczecin - Stargard - Krzyz - Poznan - Kutno - Warsaw - Lublin - Przemysl
- Intercity services Szczecin - Stargard - Krzyz - Poznan - Kutno - Warsaw - Bialystok
- Intercity services Zielona Gora - Zbaszynek - Poznan - Kutno - Warsaw
- Intercity services Wroclaw - Ostrow Wielkopolskie - Jarocin - Poznan - Kutno - Warsaw
- Intercity services Szczecin - Stargard - Krzyz - Poznan - Kutno - Lowicz - Lodz - Krakow
- Intercity services Bydgoszcz - Gniezno - Poznan - Kutno - Lowicz - Lodz - Krakow
- Regional services (KW) Poznan - Wrzesnia - Konin - Kutno
- Regional services (KW) Gniezno - Wrzesnia - Jarocin
