= Krylovo, Vladimir Oblast =

Krylovo Крылово
- Village
- Location within Vladimir Oblast Location within Russia
- Coordinates: 56°10′N 42°53′E
- Country: Russia
- Region: Vladimir Oblast
- District: Gorokhovetsky District
- Time zone: UTC+3:00

Krylovo (Russian: Крылово) is a rural locality (a village) in Kupriyanovskoye Rural Settlement, Gorokhovetsky District, Vladimir Oblast, Russia. The population was 19 as of 2010. In 2020 another population count will occur- it is assumed that the population has substantially decreased due to the extreme environment and weather.

== Geography ==
Krylovo is located 16 km southeast of Gorokhovets (the district's administrative centre) by road. Kartaganovo is the nearest rural locality.
