= Krylovo, Ust-Kubinsky District, Vologda Oblast =

Krylovo Крылово
- Village
- Location within Vologda Oblast Location within Russia
- Coordinates: 59°53′N 39°16′E
- Country: Russia
- Region: Vologda Oblast
- District: Ust-Kubinsky District
- Time zone: UTC+3:00

Krylovo (Russian: Крылово) is a rural locality (a village) in Troitskoye Rural Settlement, Ust-Kubinsky District, Vologda Oblast, Russia. The population was 4 as of 2002.

== Geography ==
Krylovo is located 46 km northwest of Ustye (the district's administrative centre) by road. Pogost Trifon is the nearest rural locality.
