= Krylovo, Cherepovetsky District, Vologda Oblast =

Krylovo Крылово
- Village
- Location within Vologda Oblast Location within Russia
- Coordinates: 59°33′N 37°35′E
- Country: Russia
- Region: Vologda Oblast
- District: Cherepovetsky District
- Time zone: UTC+3:00

Krylovo (Russian: Крылово) is a rural locality (a village) in Voskresenskoye Rural Settlement, Cherepovetsky District, Vologda Oblast, Russia. The population was 2 as of 2002.

== Geography ==
Krylovo is located 66 km (41 mi) northwest of Cherepovets (the district's administrative centre) by road. Sokolnikovo is the nearest rural locality.
