= Zheleznodorozhny, Kaliningrad Oblast =

Zheleznodorozhny Железнодоро́жный
- Town
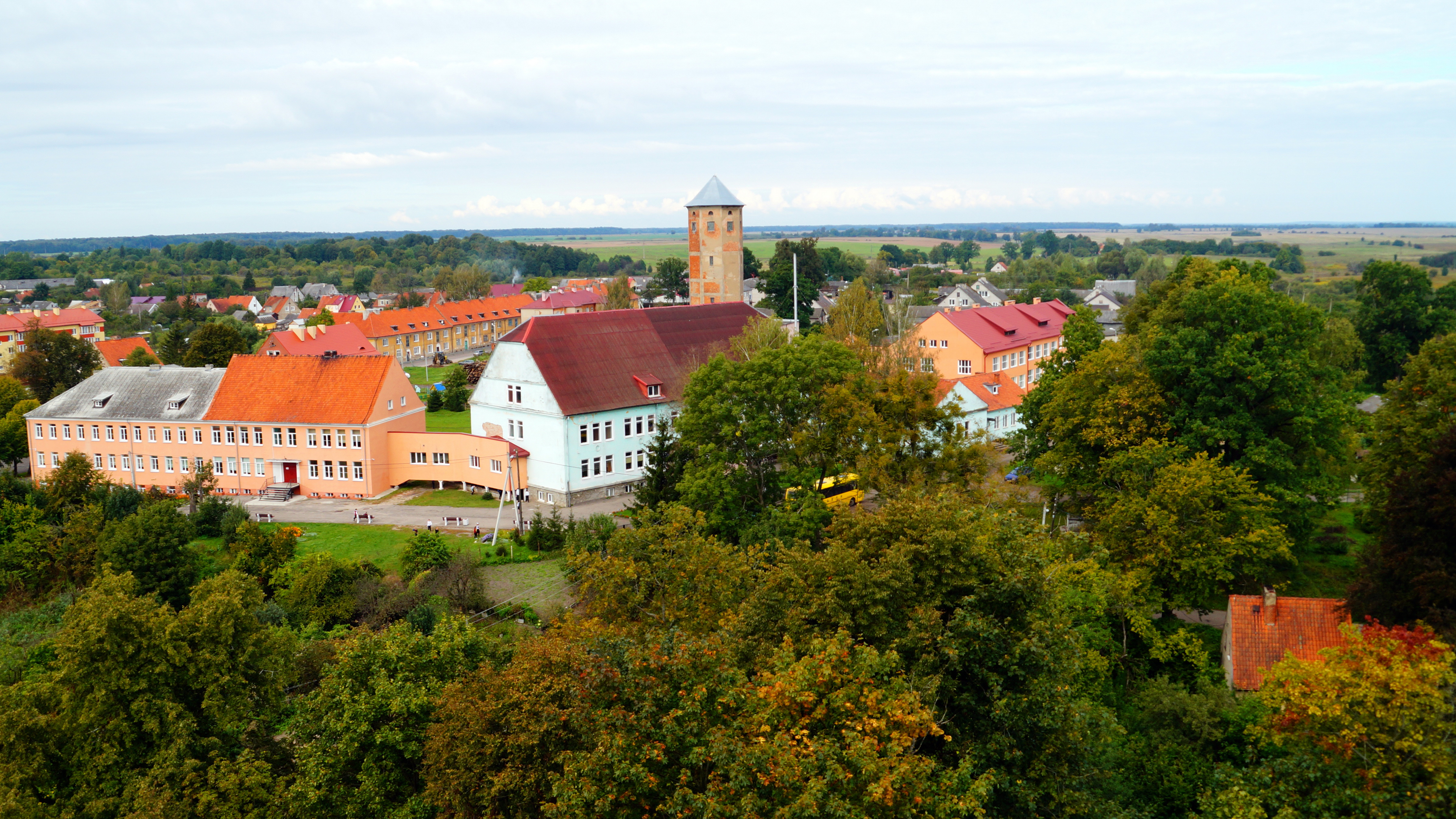
- Panorama of Zheleznodorozhny

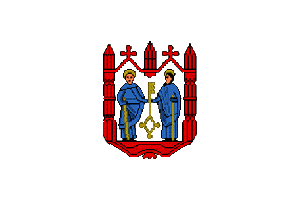
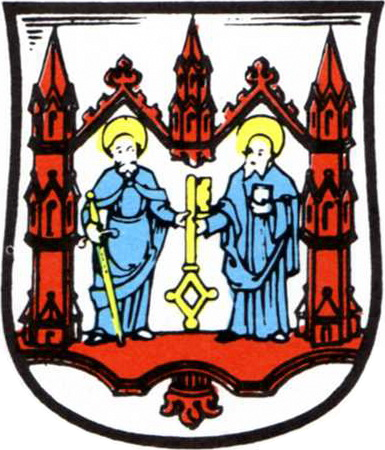
- Flag Coat of arms
- Interactive map of Zheleznodorozhny
- Location of Zheleznodorozhny Zheleznodorozhny (Kaliningrad Oblast)
- Coordinates: 54°21′40″N 21°18′42″E
- Country: Russia
- Federal subject: Kaliningrad Oblast
- Administrative district: Pravdinsky District
- Founded: 13th century
- Elevation: 35 m (115 ft)

Population (2010 Census)
  - Total: 2,767
  - Estimate (2017): 2,728 (−1.4%)
- Time zone: UTC+2 (MSK–1)
- Postal code: 238410
- OKTMO ID: 27719000052

Zheleznodorozhny (Russian: Железнодоро́жный, lit. railway (town); German: Gerdauen; Polish: Gierdawy; Lithuanian: Girdava) is an urban locality (an urban-type settlement) in Pravdinsky District of Kaliningrad Oblast, Russia. It is located 69 km (43 miles) south-east of Kaliningrad, near the border with Poland, and had a population in 2017 of 2,728.

== History ==
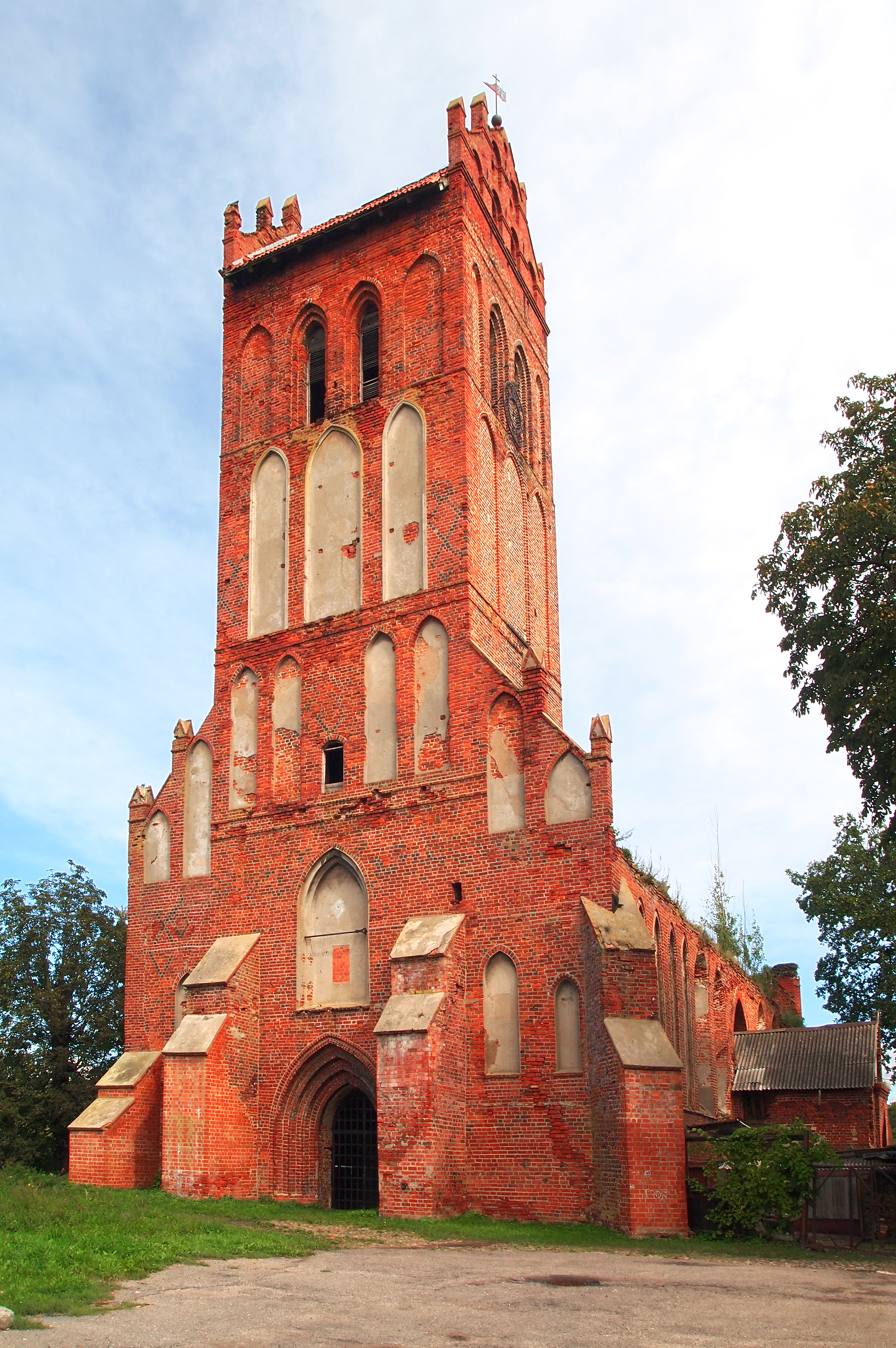
Ruined Gothic church

A fortification of the Old Prussians existed in the Zheleznodorozhny area, possibly since the 9th century, however German settlers only arrived sometime in the late 13th or early 14th century. The settlers came in connection with the construction of a castle of the Teutonic Order, which is mentioned as completed in written sources from 1315 and 1325. A lischke was formed around the castle, and was attacked by Lithuanians in 1336, 1347 and 1366, but prospered and in 1398 received Kulm law (city status) by the Grand Master of the Teutonic Order Konrad von Jungingen. A town wall was erected in 1406, and a school in 1409. In 1428, a Dominican monastery was relocated to the town from nearby Nordenbork, and it was part of the Polish Province of the Dominican Order.

In 1440, the town joined the Prussian Confederation, upon the request of which Polish King Casimir IV Jagiellon incorporated the region and town to the Kingdom of Poland in 1454. As a result, the Thirteen Years' War, the longest of all Polish–Teutonic wars, broke out, during which the local castle had been partially destroyed in battle in 1455. Following the war, in 1466, the region and town became part of Poland as a fief held by the Teutonic Knights. In 1469 the town was handed over by the Teutonic Order as a fief to the von Schlieben family, who built a new castle for themselves in the town. The town was damaged from fire in 1485 after being burnt by Polish troops, and suffered further fires in 1585 and 1665. Local monks were educated in the Polish cities of Elbląg, Gdańsk, Kraków and Toruń. Due to limited enrollment and peripheral location to other Dominican monasteries, the local monastery did not play a major role in the Polish Province of the Dominican Order and was closed during the Reformation. The castle of the Schlieben family was abandoned by 1672.

During the Seven Years' War, the town was occupied by Russia from 1758 to 1762. On June 16–17, 1807, it was the site of a victorious battle of Polish cavalry against the Russians, and the town was captured by the Poles. In 1809 Gerdauen ceased to be a fief. Following the unsuccessful Polish November Uprising, some Polish insurgents were interned in the town in 1831, most notably Ignacy Domeyko, who possibly met Wincenty Pol there. In 1868 the so-called Monks' Bridge adjacent to the former Dominican convent was demolished. A railway connection to the town was established in 1871. From 1871, the town was part of Germany, within which it was located in the province of East Prussia. The ruins of the old castle served as the foundation for the construction of a residential building in 1874, with the large cellar of the castle incorporated into the new building.

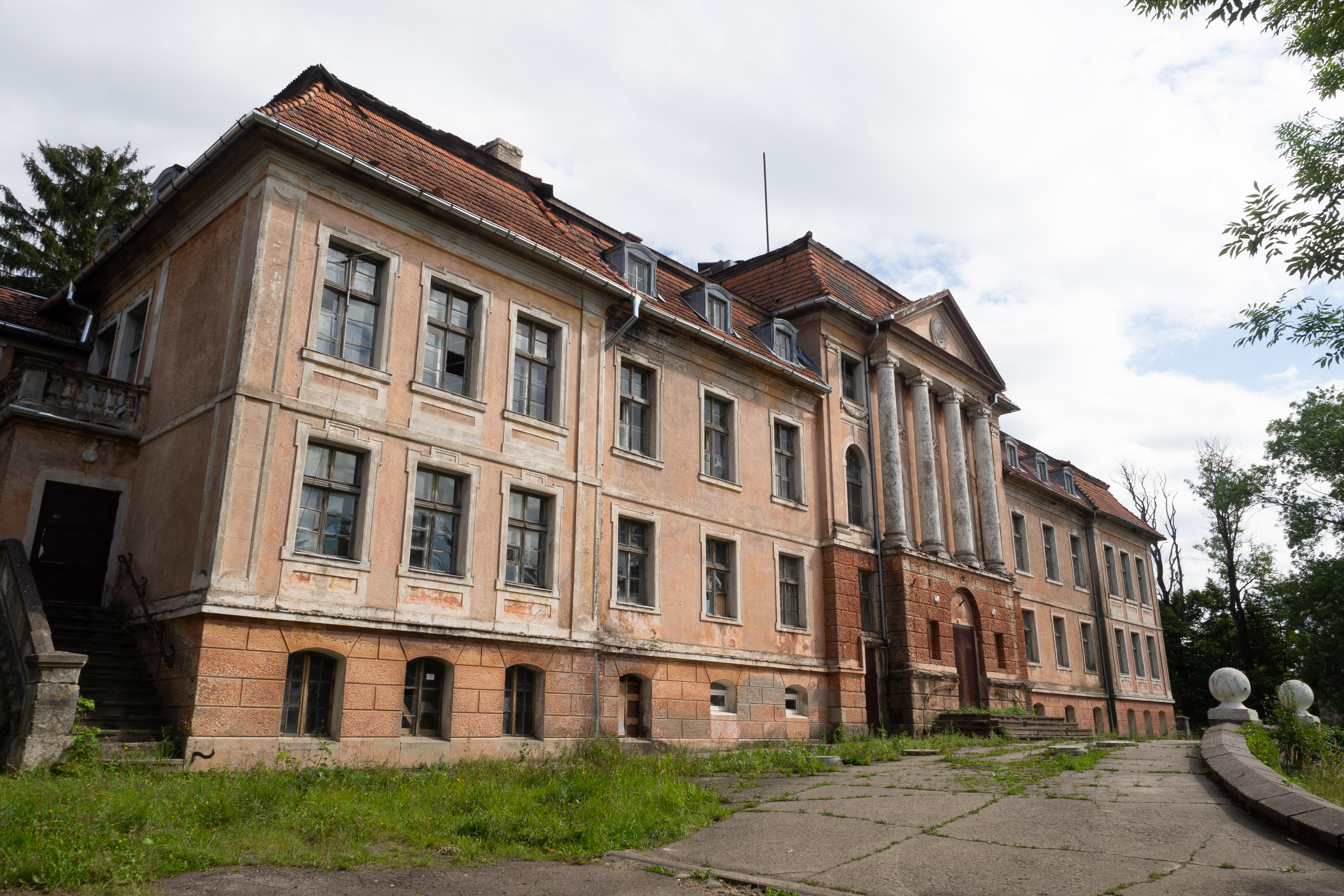
Former county office

Gerdauen was heavily damaged during fighting in World War I, but later rebuilt with monetary assistance from Wilmersdorf in Berlin, and the city of Budapest, Hungary. It prospered due to the malt processing industry and a large brewery, and in 1937 it had 5,152 inhabitants. During World War II, in 1944–1945, it was the location of Außenarbeitslager Gerdauen, a subcamp of the Stutthof concentration camp, in which the Germans imprisoned around 900 Jewish women and 100 Jewish men as forced labour. The town was damaged again during World War II.

Following Germany's defeat in the war, the town initially passed to Poland, within which it was a county seat. It was then known under its historic Polish name Gierdawy. A local Polish settlement inspectorate was established. However, the town was soon unilaterally annexed by the Soviet Union in violation of the Polish-Soviet border agreement, and included within the Kaliningrad Oblast. The German population was expelled in accordance with the Potsdam Agreement and replaced with mostly Russian settlers. In 1946 the name was changed to its current name Zheleznodorozhny. After the collapse of the Soviet Union in 1991, Zheleznodorozhny became a part of the Russian Federation.

In January 2024, one of two half timber framed warehouses, both of which are cultural heritage sites of the Kaliningrad region, was dismantled due to serious deterioration. The planned restoration of the warehouses is currently ongoing.

== Demographics ==
Historical population
| Year | Pop. | ±% |
|---|---|---|
| 1989 | 3,246 | — |
| 2002 | 2,945 | −9.3% |
| 2010 | 2,767 | −6.0% |

=== Ethnic composition ===
Russian - 83.3%, Belarusians - 6.3%, Ukrainians - 3.8%, Germans - 2.3%, Armenians - 2.1%, Poles - 0.6%, Others - 1.6%

== Notable people ==
- Theodor Gottlieb von Hippel the Elder (1741–1796), satirical writer
- Theodor Gottlieb von Hippel the Younger (1775–1837), jurist
- Wilhelm Steputat (1868–1941), author, jurist, politician
- Reinhold Rehs (1901 in Klinthenen – 1971) German politician and chairman of the Federation of Expellees in 1967–70
- Hans Jenisch (1913–1982), U-boat commander
- Wolfgang Bernhard Jurkat (1929–2017), mathematician
- Hinrich Kuessner (born 1943), SPD-politician in Mecklenburg-Vorpommern
