= Radegast train station =

Historic railway station in Łódź, Poland

Coordinates: 51°48′08″N 19°28′48″E

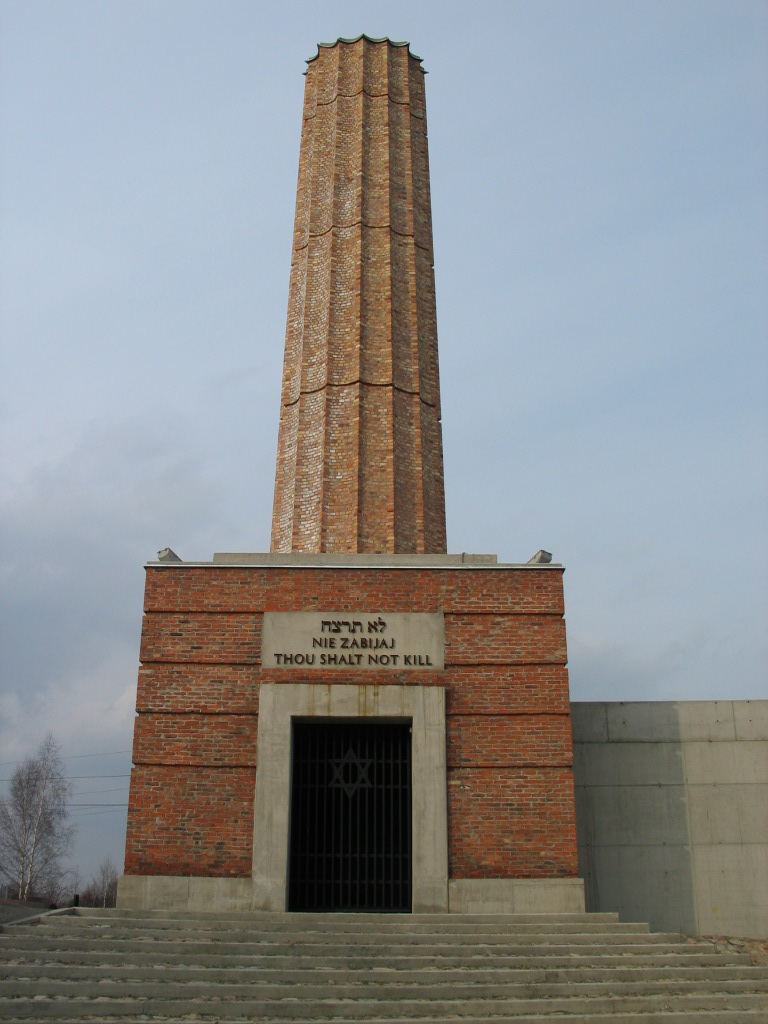
Holocaust monument at Radegast

Radogoszcz station (German: Bahnhof Radegast) is a historic railway station in Łódź, Poland. The station, which was originally built between 1926 and 1937, was used extensively during the Holocaust. It served as the Umschlagplatz for transporting Jews from the Łódź Ghetto to the extermination camps during Operation Reinhard. The "loading platform" is in Marysin, a neighbourhood in the city's Bałuty district.

== The Holocaust ==
During Second World War, the station was situated just outside the Łódź Ghetto – one of the biggest Jewish ghettos in German-occupied Europe. The Umschlagplatz at the Radegast station was the place where predominantly Jewish inhabitants of Łódź including thousands of persons expelled from across occupied Poland were gathered for deportation directly to Chełmno (Kulmhof) and Auschwitz German extermination camps. Approximately 200,000 Polish, Austrian, German, Luxemburg and Czech Jews, and many Roma, Sinti and Lalleri passed through the station on the way to their deaths in the period from January 16, 1942, to August 29, 1944. The collection point had the same significance for Łódź as the better known Umschlagplatz had for the Warsaw Ghetto.

== Memorial ==
In 2004, the commemoration ceremonies on the sixtieth anniversary of the destruction of the Łódź Ghetto in 1944 and the departure of the last transport from Radegast spurred efforts to transform the former station into a Holocaust memorial. On August 28, 2005, a monument commemorating the Jewish victims who passed through the station was unveiled, based on design by Czesław Bielecki, and featuring the 140-metre (460 ft) Tunnel of the Deported. The renovated station building serves as one of the divisions of the Łódź Museum of Independence.

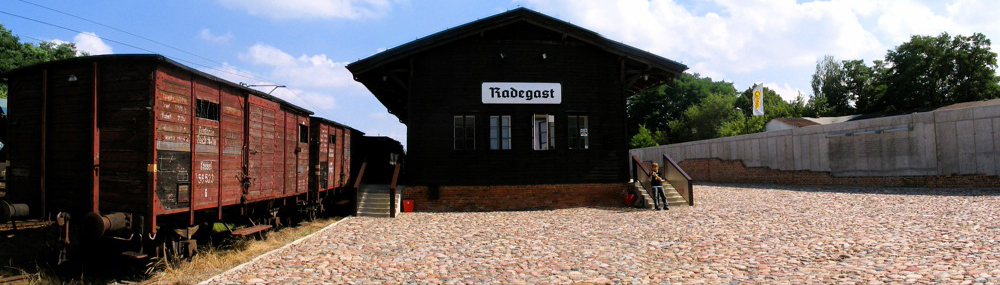
The Umschlagplatz (holding area) at Radegast station, with period cattle trucks similar to the ones used to transport people to the extermination camps during Operation Reinhard.
