= Poznań–Skandawa railway =

Railway line in Poland and Russia

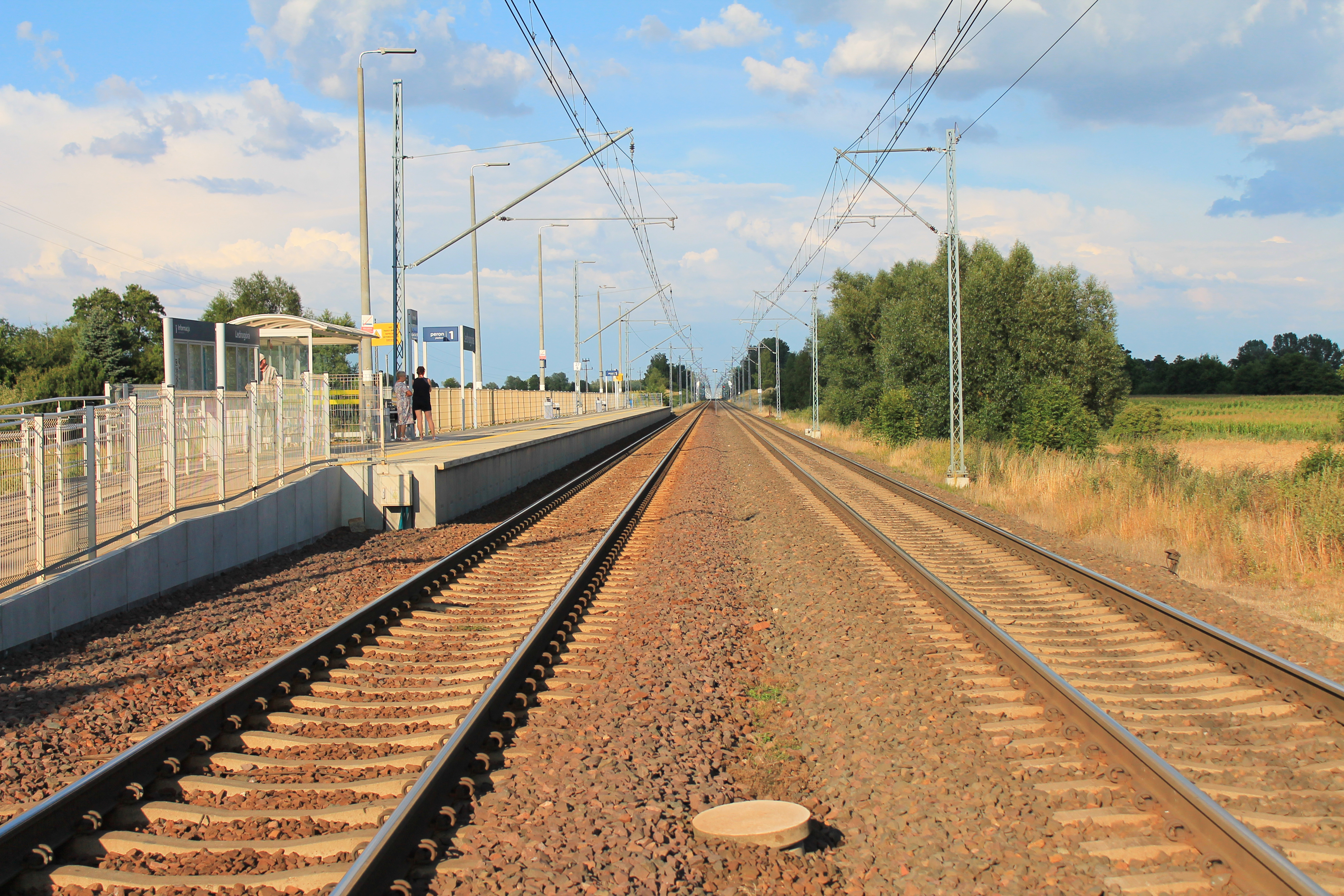
- Rail line 353 in Lednogóra

Overview
- Status: in use
- Locale: Poland; Kaliningrad Oblast
- Termini: Poznań; Skandawa and Zheleznodorozhny

Service
- Type: Heavy rail
- Route number: 353

History
- Opened: 1871

Technical
- Line length: 389.875 km (242.257 mi)
- Track gauge: 1,435 mm (4 ft 8 1/2 in) standard gauge
- Electrification: 3000 V DC on the section Poznań to Korsze
- Operating speed: 150 km/h (93 mph)

The Poznań–Skandawa railway is a 389-kilometre-long (242 mi) railway line in Poland. It connects Poznań with Inowrocław, Toruń, and Olsztyn, then continues to the Polish-Russian border at Skandawa, Kaliningrad Oblast.

== Opening ==
The line was opened in stages between 1871 and 1873.

Date	Section
20 November 1871	Toruń Wschodni - Jabłonowo Pomorskie - Double track
27 November 1871	Czerwonka - Żeleznodorożnyj - Double track
26 May 1872	Poznań Wschód - Inowrocław - Single track, doubled on 1 January 1886
1 December 1872	Jabłonowo Pomorskie – Ostróda - Double track
1 December 1872	Olsztyn Główny - Czerwonka - Double track
1 July 1873	Inowrocław - Toruń Główny - Double track
15 August 1873	Toruń Główny – Toruń Wschodni - Double track
15 August 1873	Ostróda – Olsztyn Główny - Double track

== Closure ==
The line between Korsze and Żeleznodorożnyj became single track from 1 January 1945.

On 12 March 2000 the line between Skandawa and Żeleznodorożnyj was closed to passenger traffic and on 3 April 2000 also between Korsze and Skandawa.

== Electrification ==
Electrification took place in six stages between 1976 and 1990:

- 23 December 1976 - electrification of section Poznań Wschód – Inowrocław
- 20 December 1983 - electrification of section Inowrocław – Toruń Główny
- 16 October 1986 - electrification of section of Toruń Wschodni – Iława Główna
- 13 December 1987 - electrification of section of the Toruń Główny – Toruń Wschodni
- 3 October 1988 - electrification of section Iława Główna – Olsztyn Główny
- 18 December 1990 - electrification of section Olsztyn Główny - Korsze

== Modernisation ==
On 3 October 2016 PKP PLK signed a contract with ZUE for the modernisation of part of Line 353 on the section Ostrowite - Biskupiec Pomorski and Biskupiec Pomorski - Jamielnik within the project "Work on Line 353 on the section Jabłonowo Pom. - Iława - Olsztyn - Korsze". Work will start in October 2017.

== Usage ==
The line sees trains of various categories (EuroCity, Express InterCity, Intercity, TLK and regional services).

- EuroCity services from Berlin to Gdynia between Poznań Wschód and Inowrocław
- Express Intercity, Intercity and TLK services along the route between Poznań Wschód, Inowrocław (for Bydgoszcz and Gdańsk), Toruń, Olsztyn and Korsze (for Elk)
- Regional services
  - Przewozy Regionalne along the whole route
  - Koleje Wielkopolskie between Poznań Wschód and Gniezno

== See also ==
- Railway lines of Poland
