= Kutno railway station =

Railway station in Kutno, Poland

Kutno
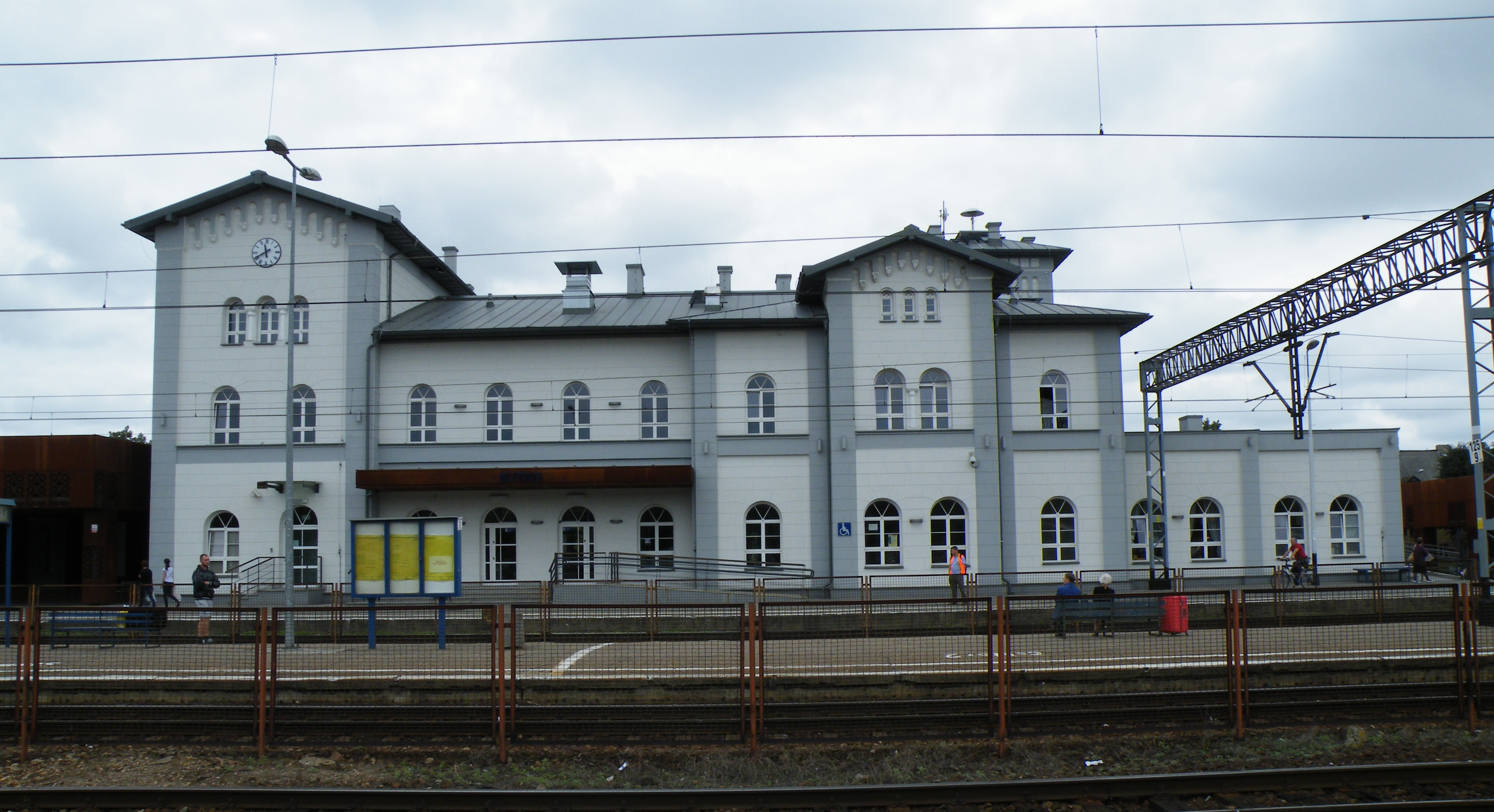
- Kutno railway station

General information
- Location: Kutno, Łódź Voivodeship; Poland
- Coordinates: 52°13′38″N 19°20′56″E
- System: Railway Station
- Operator: PKP; Masovian Railways; Greater Poland Railways; Łódź Agglomeration Railway; Polregio
- Lines: 3: Warsaw–Kunowice railway 16: Łódź–Kutno railway 18: Kutno–Piła railway 33: Kutno–Brodnica railway
- Platforms: 7

History
- Opened: 1861; 165 years ago
- Rebuilt: 2011-2012
Location
- Location within Poland

Kutno railway station is a railway station in Kutno, in the Łódź Voivodeship, Poland. The station opened in 1861 and is located on the Warsaw–Kunowice railway, Łódź–Kutno railway, Kutno–Piła railway and Kutno–Brodnica railway. The train services are operated by PKP, Masovian Railways, Greater Poland Railways, Łódź Agglomeration Railway and Polregio.

The station is one of the most important stations in the Łódź Voivodeship. Beyond the station, in the direction of Poznań there is a goods station called Kutno Azory.

== Modernisation ==
In 2011, a major renovation of the railway and station began. On 11 June 2012 the rebuilt station was opened for passengers, rebuilt at the cost of over 13 million zł.

== Train services ==
The station is served by the following service(s):

- EuroCity services (EC) (EC 95 by DB) (EIC by PKP) Berlin - Frankfurt (Oder) - Rzepin - Poznan - Kutno - Warsaw
- EuroNight services (EN) Cologne - Duisburg - Dortmund - Berlin - Frankfurt (Oder) - Poznan - Kutno - Warsaw
- Express Intercity services (EIC) Szczecin — Warsaw
- Intercity services Swinoujscie - Szczecin - Stargard - Krzyz - Poznan - Kutno - Warsaw
- Intercity services Szczecin - Stargard - Krzyz - Poznan - Kutno - Lowicz - Warsaw - Lublin - Rzeszow - Przemysl
- Intercity services Szczecin - Stargard - Krzyz - Poznan - Kutno - Lowicz - Warsaw - Bialystok
- Intercity services Zielona Gora - Zbaszynek - Poznan - Kutno - Warsaw
- Intercity services Wroclaw - Ostrow Wielkopolskie - Jarocin - Poznan - Kutno - Warsaw
- Intercity services Kolobrzeg - Pila - Bydgoszcz - Torun - Kutno - Lowicz - Warsaw
- Intercity services Szczecin - Pila - Bydgoszcz - Torun - Kutno - Lowicz - Warsaw - Lublin - Rzeszow - Przemysl
- Intercity services Gorzow Wielkopolskie - Krzyz - Pila - Bydgoszcz - Torun - Kutno - Lowicz - Warsaw
- Intercity services Gdynia - Gdansk - Bydgoszcz - Torun - Kutno - Lowicz - Warsaw - Lublin - Rzeszow - Zagorz/Przemysl
- Intercity services Gdynia - Gdansk - Bydgoszcz - Torun - Kutno - Lodz - Czestochowa - Krakow - Zakopane
- Intercity services Szczecin - Stargard - Krzyz - Poznan - Kutno - Lowicz - Lodz - Krakow
- Intercity services Bydgoszcz - Gniezno - Poznan - Kutno - Lowicz - Lodz - Krakow
- Intercity services (IC) Łódź Fabryczna — Bydgoszcz — Gdynia Główna
- Intercity services (IC) Gdynia - Gdańsk - Bydgoszcz - Toruń - Kutno - Łódź - Częstochowa - Katowice - Bielsko-Biała
- Intercity services (TLK) Gdynia Główna — Bydgoszcz — Łódź — Katowice
- Intercity services (TLK) Gdynia Główna — Grudziądz — Łódź — Katowice
- Regional services (PR) Bydgoszcz - Solec Kujawski - Torun - Wloclawek - Kutno
- Regional services (PR) Kutno - Lowicz - Skierniewice
- Regional services (PR) Torun - Wloclawek - Kutno - Leczyca - Zgierz - Lodz
- Regional services (KM) Kutno - Lowicz - Sochaczew - Blonie - Warsaw
- Regional services (KM) Sierpc - Plock - Kutno
- Regional services (KW) Poznan - Wrzesnia - Konin - Kutno
- Regional services (LKA) Kutno - Zgierz - Lodz
- Regional services (LKA) Skierniewice - Kutno

Preceding station	PKP Intercity	Following station
Konin towards Berlin Hbf	EuroCity EC 95; EIC	Warszawa Zachodnia towards Warszawa Wschodnia
Konin towards Köln Hbf	EuroNight	Warszawa Zachodnia towards Warszawa Wschodnia
Konin towards Szczecin Główny	EIC	Warszawa Zachodnia towards Warszawa Wschodnia
Łęczyca towards Katowice	TLK Via Bydgoszcz Główna	Włocławek towards Gdynia Główna
Łęczyca towards Katowice	TLK Via Grudziądz	Gostynin towards Gdynia Główna
Preceding station	Polregio	Following station
Ostrowy towards Bydgoszcz Główna	PR	Terminus
Terminus	PR	Sklęczki towards Skierniewice
Ostrowy towards Toruń Główny	PR	Witonia towards Łódź Kaliska
Preceding station	Masovian Railways	Following station
Terminus	R3	Łowicz Główny towards Warszawa Wschodnia or Warszawa Główna
Kutno Azory towards Sierpc	R31	Terminus
Preceding station	KW	Following station
Nowe Kutnowskie towards Poznań Główny	Poznań - Kutno	Terminus
Preceding station	ŁKA	Following station
Terminus	Łódź - Kutno	Witonia towards Łódź Kaliska
Sklęczko towards Skierniewice	Skierniewice - Kutno	Terminus
