= Łódź–Kutno railway =

Railway line in Poland

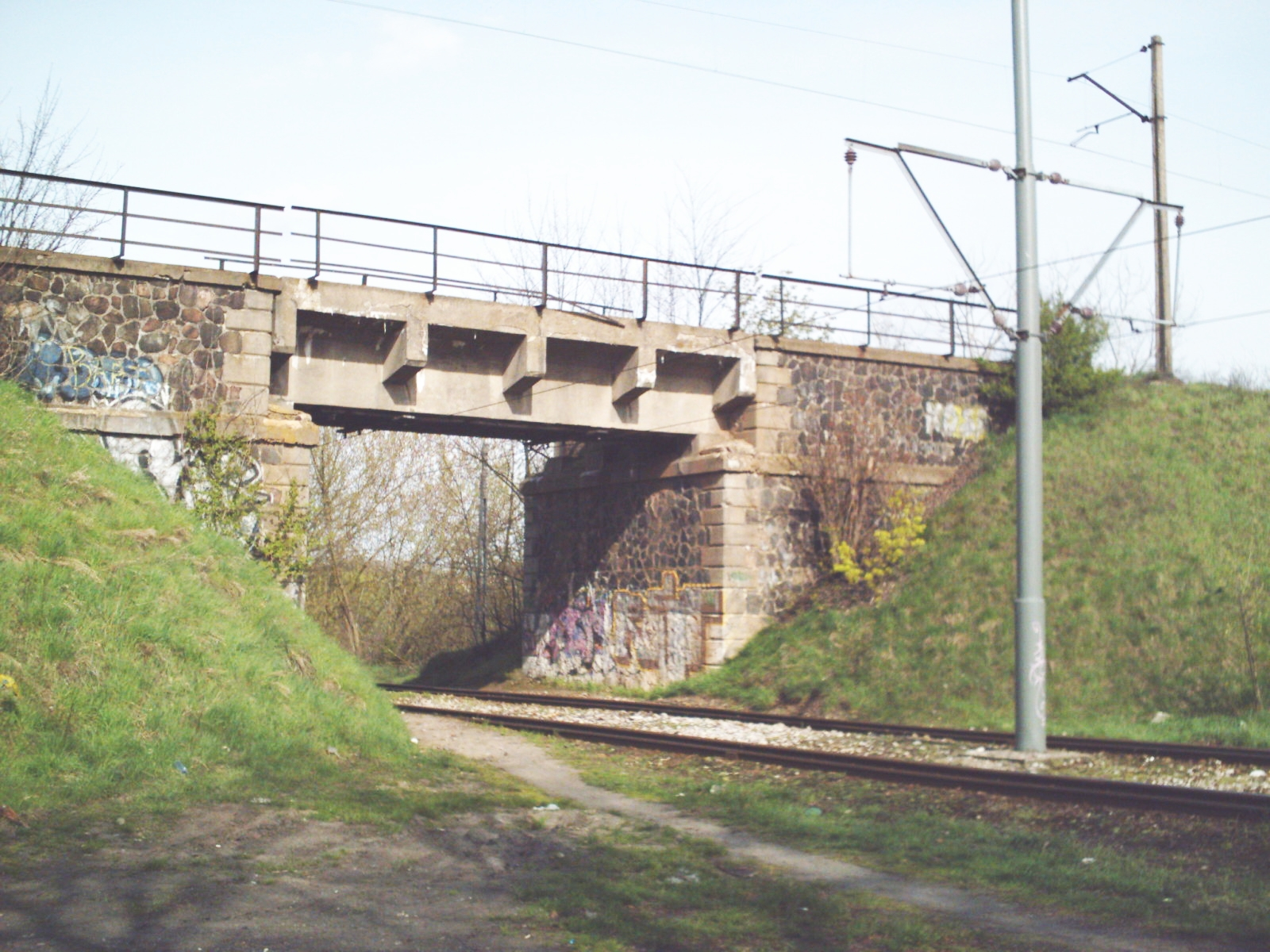
- A railway viaduct in Stoki (Widzew district) over the tram line between Pomorska and Telefoniczna streets in 2007

Overview
- Native name: Linia kolejowa Łódź Widzew - Kutno
- Status: In use
- Owner: PKP PLK
- Line number: 16
- Locale: Łódź Voivodeship, Poland
- Termini: Łódź Widzew; Kutno
- Continues from: 17 Łódź-Koluszki railway
- Continues as: 3 Warsaw-Kunowice railway (toward Konin)
- Connecting lines: Łódź Widzew; 17 Łódź-Koluszki railway; 540 to Chojny; 541 to Olechów; Zgierz; 15 Łódź-Bednary railway; Kutno; 3 Warsaw-Kunowice railway; 18 to Piła; 33 to Brodnica

Service
- Type: Heavy rail

History
- Opened: 1923 (Zgierz - Kutno), 1931 (Łódź - Zgierz)

Technical
- Line length: 71.027 km (44.134 mi)
- Number of tracks: 1
- Track gauge: 1,435 mm (4 ft 8 1/2 in)
- Electrification: Overhead wire, 3000 V DC
- Operating speed: 100 km/h (62 mph)

The Łódź—Kutno railway is a railway line located in central Poland, in Łódź Voivodeship, connecting the city of Łódź with a railway station in Kutno via Zgierz, Ozorków and Łęczyca. The section between Łódź Widzew and Zgierz stations is a part of a railway ring around the city of Łódź.

== History ==
Construction of the railway was commenced by Polish State Railways in 1920. In 1923 the partially finished section between Zgierz and Łęczyca was opened, three years later a link to Kutno was finished. The section between Zgierz and Widzew stations was finished in 1931.

The railway was electrified within two stages: in 1969 (Łódź Widzew-Zgierz) and 1981 (Zgierz-Kutno).

== Current condition ==
The railway line is currently used for both freight and passenger services. The section between Zgierz and Kutno is listed as the railway of national importance. However, due to being single-track, the capacity of the railway is vastly limited, especially with regional passenger services from Łódź to Kutno.

The railway line is mainly served by ŁKA regional trains from Łódź Kaliska station to Kutno and commuter trains from Łódź Fabryczna station to Zgierz. Also, PolRegio trains from Łódź to Toruń, as well as PKP Intercity trains between Gdynia and Katowice, use this railway.

== Future ==
The railway is due to be refurbished, in order to allow a 20 kilometres per hour (12 mph) increase in operational speed. There are plans to either build up a second track on Zgierz-Kutno section, or create new railway connecting these two stations, which will run mostly intercity passenger services.
