= Łódź Agglomeration Railway =

Polish commuter and regional rail service

- Native name: Łódzka Kolej Aglomeracyjna
- Type: Ltd.
- Industry: Rail transport
- Founded: 2010
- Headquarters: Łódź, Poland
- Area served: Łódź Voivodeship
- Key people: Maciej Sobieraj, CEO; Andrzej Dzierbicki, Chairperson of the Board
- Owner: Łódź Voivodeship
- Website: www.lka.lodzkie.pl

The Łódź Agglomeration Railway (Polish: Łódzka Kolej Aglomeracyjna; ŁKA) is a commuter and regional rail service operating between the Polish city of Łódź and surrounding towns in the Łódź Voivodeship.

The company was founded in 2010 and is fully owned by the Łódź Voivodeship.

== Services ==
The railway operates services to destinations between Łódź and the following towns and cities: Koluszki, Kutno, Łowicz, Sieradz, Skierniewice, Zgierz.

On weekends, services operate between Łódź and the Warszawa Wschodnia railway station in Warsaw.

The main termini stations of the network are Łódź Kaliska, Zgierz and Łódź Widzew. Services are operated on railway tracks owned by PKP Polskie Linie Kolejowe, which are shared with other rail operators. The central sections of ŁKA form a circular line encircling the city of Łódź, running between Łódź Kaliska railway station and the Widzew railway station in the Łódź suburb of Widzew, the town of Zgierz, and concluding at Łódź Kaliska railway station. Although the system maps and timetables depict a circular line, in reality, there is no service that runs continually around the city. Instead, commuters must catch trains travelling to an outlying destination, and change at one of the three main stations to continue travelling around the circular line.

== History ==
The company was established in May 2010 by the Łódź Voivodeship.

The Voivodeship undertook a major rail upgrade program worth €72m, 50% of which was funded by the European Union. The program involved upgrading rail tracks and existing railway stations, constructing new railway stations at a number of regional locations, and undertaking a major reconstruction of the existing station in Widzew. A new train maintenance depot was also constructed in Widzew. The program also involved improving bus connections, building park and ride facilities, ticket facilities, and purchasing a fleet of 20 new trains.

The railway commenced operation on 15 June 2014.

The Voivodeship Government has indicated that it intends to purchase 14 more trains and extend services to Radom, Piotrków Trybunalski, Skierniewice, Bełchatów and Złoczew.

On 11 December 2018, the company launched a new route between Skierniewice and Łowicz (extended to Kutno on 15 December 2019), and on 10 March 2019 it launched new routes from Łódź Fabryczna station to Piotrków Trybunalski, Radomsko and Tomaszów Mazowiecki.

== Rolling stock ==
ŁKA began operations with an order of 20 Stadler FLIRT two-car EMUs, which entered service starting in 2014 and were delivered through early 2015. In September 2016, Stadler was named the preliminary winner of a contract to supply 14 three-car EMUs, but after a legal challenge from Newag, the latter was in February 2017 awarded the contract for its Impuls II EMU, the first of which entered service in December 2018. Also, 10 of 20 FLIRT EMUs are scheduled to be lengthened to three cars.

In February 2023, Pesa Bydgoszcz was named the winner of a contract to supply 4 three-car Regio160 EMUs, with an option for 20 more.

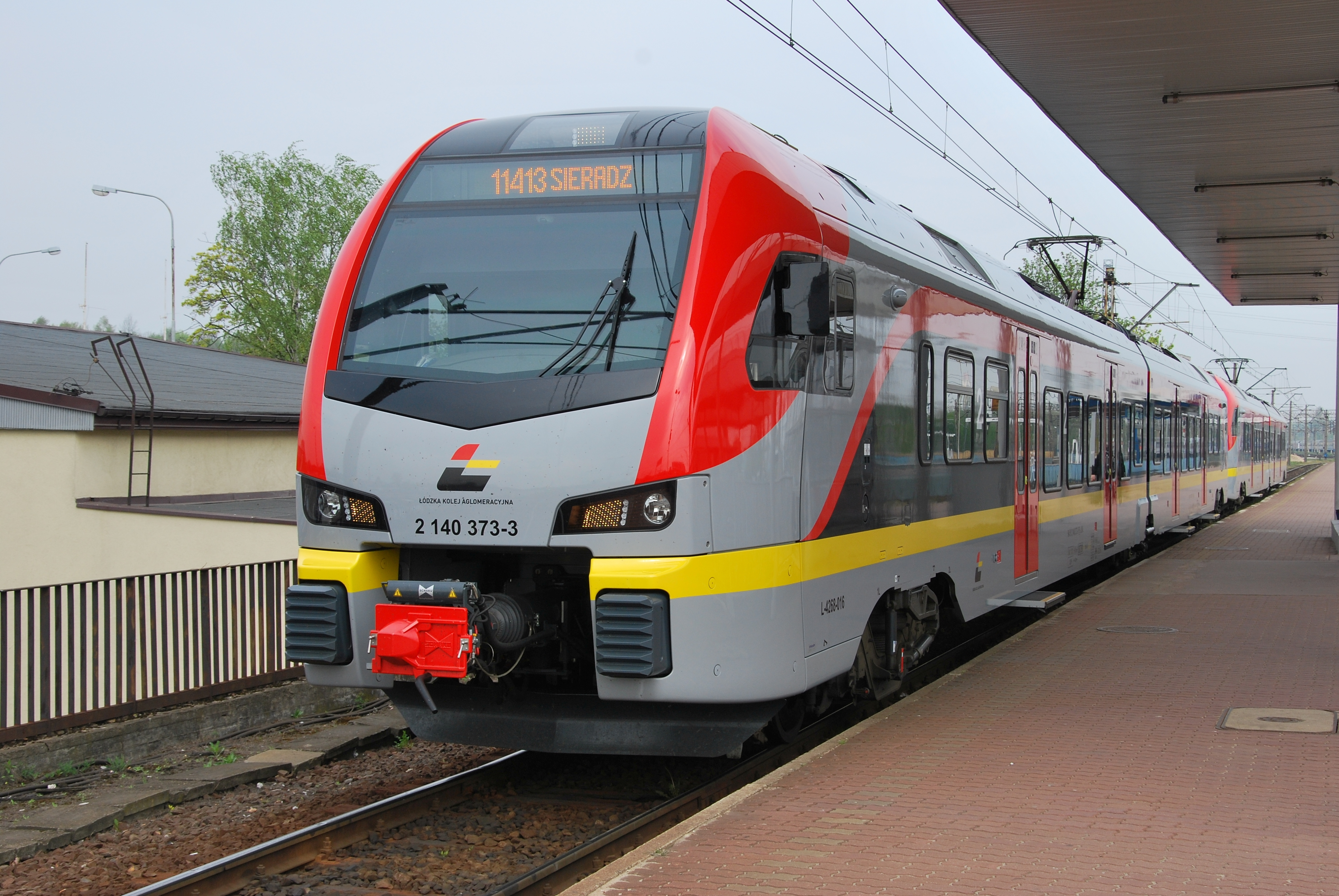
ŁKA Stadler FLIRT at Łódź Kaliska station

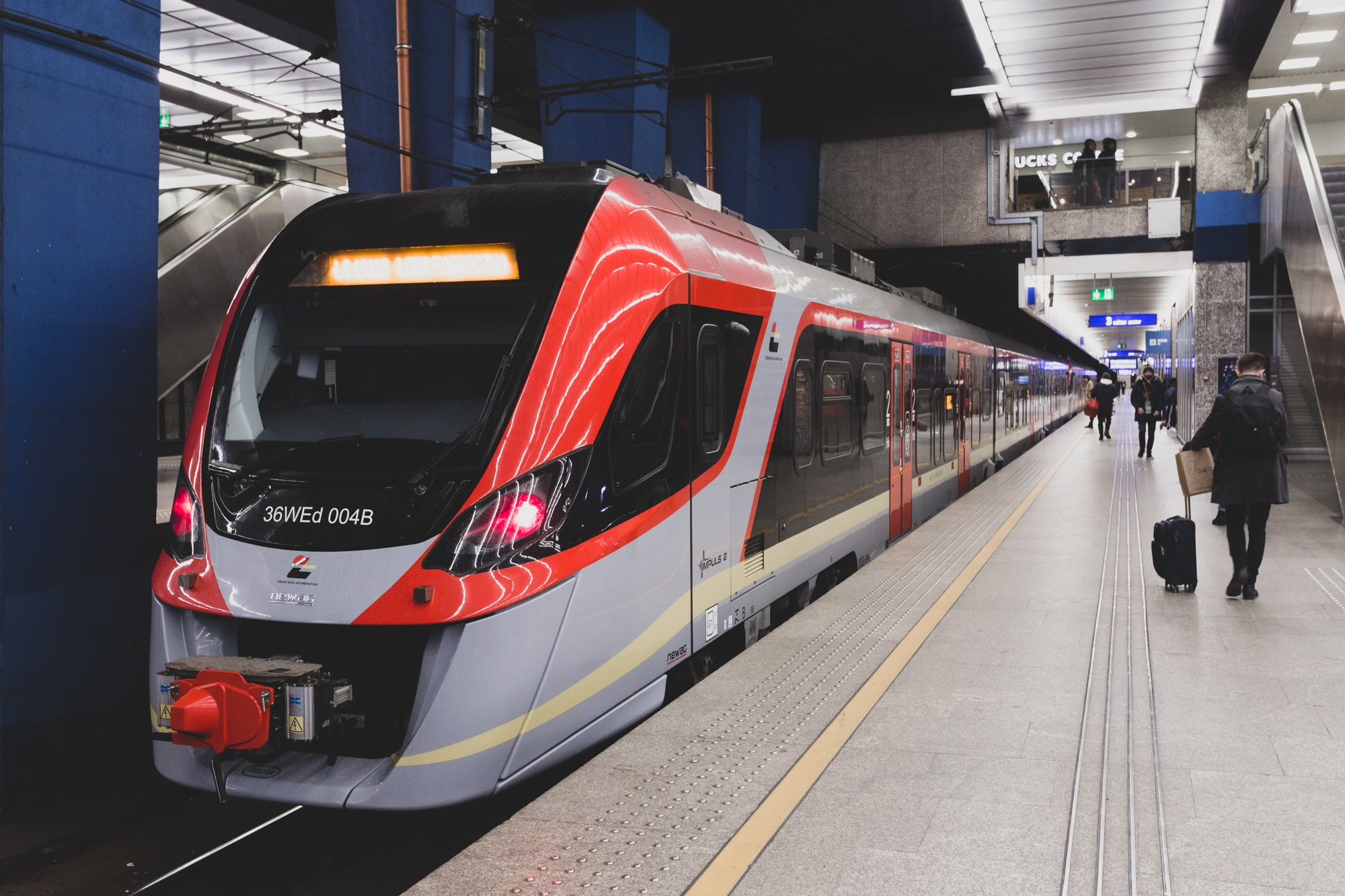
ŁKA Newag Impuls II at Warszawa Centralna station

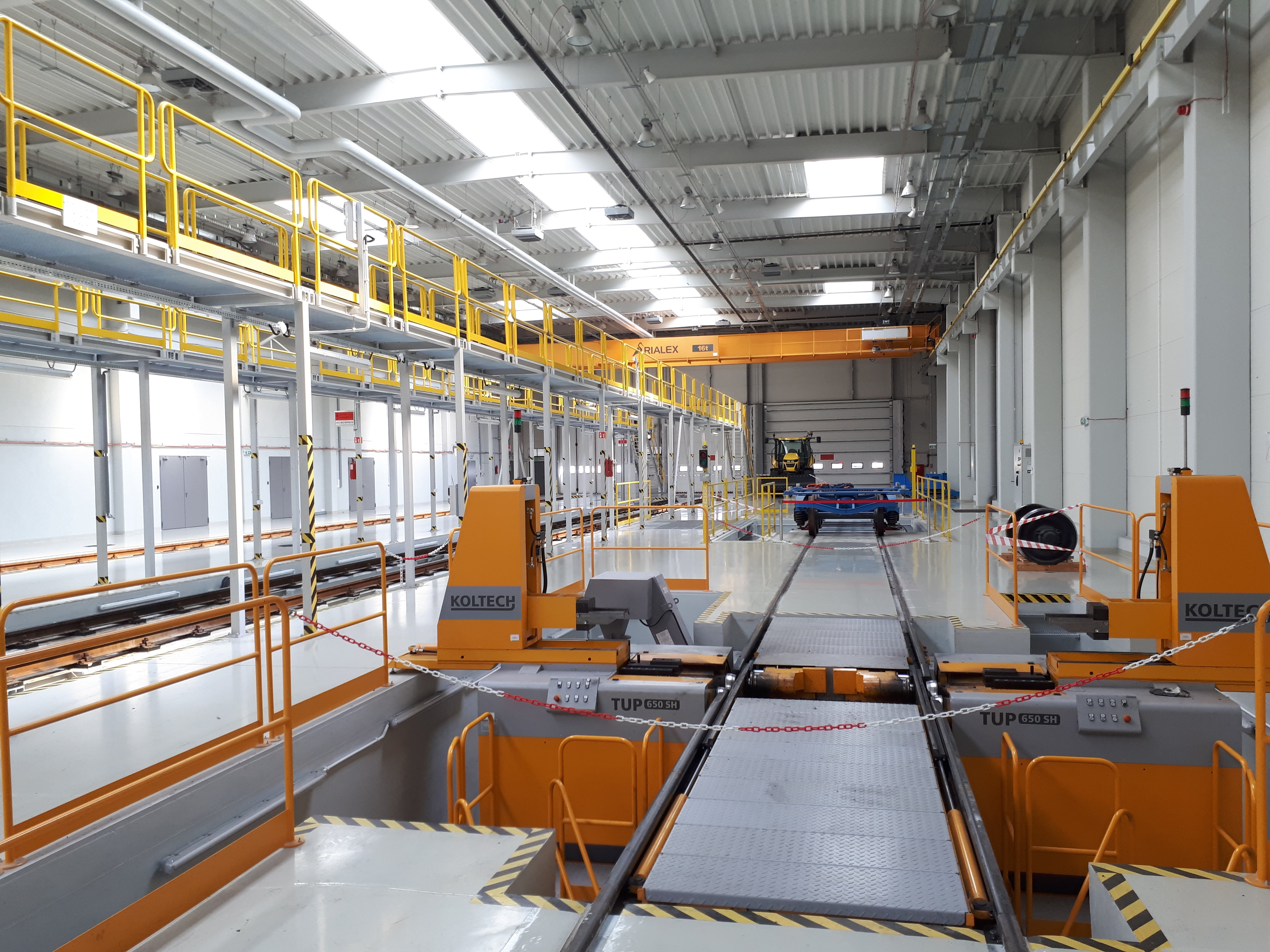
Inside the ŁKA Widzew workshops

== Routes ==
Source: Rozkłady jazdy (in Polish)

=== ŁÓDŹ CIRCULAR LINE (Purple) ===
ŁÓDŹ CIRCULAR LINE
ŁÓDŹ WIDZEW • Łódź Stoki • Łódź Marysin • Łódź Warszawska • Łódź Arturówek • Łódź Radgoszcz Wschód • ZGIERZ • Łódź Radgoszcz Zachód • Łódź Żabieniec • ŁÓDŹ KALISKA • Łodź Pabianicka • Łódź Chojny • Łódź Olechów Wiadukt • Łódź olechów Zachód • Łódź Olechów Wschód • Łódź Andrzejów Szosa • ŁÓDŹ WIDZEW

=== ŁÓDŹ - KUTNO (Red) ===
ŁÓDŹ - ZGIERZ - KUTNO

ŁÓDŹ WIDZEW • Łódź Zarzew • Łódź Dąbrowa • Łódź Chojny • Łódź Pabianicka • ŁÓDŹ KALISKA • Łódź Żabieniec • Łódź Radogoszcz Zachód • ZGIERZ • Zgierz Jaracza • Zgierz Północ • Zgierz Kontrewers • Jedlicze koło Zgierza • Grotniki • Chociszew • Ozorków Nowe Miasto • OZORKÓW • Sierpów • ŁĘCZYCA • Gawrony • Witonia • KUTNO

=== ŁÓDŹ - SIERADZ - POZNAŃ (Orange) ===
ŁÓDŹ - PABIANICE - ŁASK - ZDUŃSKA WOLA - SIERADZ - OSTRÓW WIELKOPOLSKI - POZNAŃ

ŁÓDŹ FABRYCZNA • Łódź Niciarniana •ŁÓDŹ WIDZEW • Łódź Zarzew • Łódź Dąbrowa • Łódź Chojny • Łódź Pabianicka • ŁÓDŹ KALISKA • Łódź Retkinia • Łódź Lublinek •Pabianice Północne • PABIANICE • Chechło • Dobroń • Kolumna • ŁASK • Borszewice • ZDUŃSKA WOLA • Izabelów • Męcka Wola • Sieradz Męka • Sieradz Warta • SIERADZ • Błaszki • Opatówek • Kalisz • Nowe Sklamierzyce • OSTRÓW WIELKOPOLSKI • Pleszew • Jarocin • Środa wielkopolska • Poznań Krzesiny • Poznań Starołęka • Poznań Dębina • POZNAŃ GŁÓWNY

=== ŁÓDŹ - ŁOWICZ (Blue) ===
ŁÓDŹ - STRYKÓW - GŁOWNO - ŁOWICZ

ŁÓDŹ WIDZEW • Łódź Zarzew • Łódź Dąbrowa • Łódź Chojny • Łódź Pabianicka • ŁÓDŹ KALISKA • Łódź Żabieniec • Łódź Radogoszcz Zachód • ZGIERZ • Smardzew • Glinnik Wieś • Glinnik • Swędów • STRYKÓW • Bratoszewice • GŁOWNO • Kamień Łowicki • Domaniewice Centrum • Domaniewice • Grudze • Łowicz Przedmieście • ŁOWICZ GŁÓWNY

=== ŁÓDŹ – KOLUSZKI - SKIERNIEWICE - WARSZAWA (Green) ===
ŁÓDŹ – KOLUSZKI - SKIERNIEWICE - WARSZAWA

ŁÓDŹ FABRYCZNA • Łódź Niciarniana • ŁÓDŹ WIDZEW • Łódź Andrzejów • Bedoń • Justynów • Gałkówek • Żakowice • KOLUSZKI • Wągry • Rogów • Przyłęk Duży • Krosnowa • Lipce Reymontowskie • Płyćwia • Maków • Dąbrowice Skierniewickie • SKIERNIEWICE • WARSZAWA ZACHODNIA • WARSZAWA CENTRALNA • WARSZAWA WSCHODNIA

=== SKIERNIEWICE - KUTNO LINE (Dark Blue) ===
SKIERNIEWICE - KUTNO

SKIERNIEWICE • Mokra • Sierakowice Skierniewickie • Bełchów • Bobrowniki • ŁOWICZ GŁÓWNY • Niedźwiada Łowicka • Jackowice • Zosinów • Żychlin • Złotniki Kutnowskie • Sklęczki • KUTNO

=== ŁÓDŹ – KOLUSZKI - PIOTRKÓW TRYBUNALSKI - RADOMSKO - CZĘSTOCHOWA (Yellow) ===
ŁÓDŹ – KOLUSZKI - PIOTRKÓW TRYBUNALSKI - RADOMSKO - CZĘSTOCHOWA

ŁÓDŹ FABRYCZNA • Łódź Niciarniana • ŁÓDŹ WIDZEW • Łódź Andrzejów • Bedoń • Justynów • Gałkówek • Żakowice • KOLUSZKI • Chrusty Nowe • Rokiciny • Łaznów • Wolbórka • Baby • Moszczenica • Jarosty • PIOTRKÓW TRYBUNALSKI • Milejów • Rozprza • Luciążanka • Wilkoszewice • Gorzkowice • Gorzędów • Kamieńsk • Gomunice • Dobryszyce k/Radomska • RADOMSKO• Bobry • Widzów Teklinów • Jacków • Kłomnice • Rzerzęczyce • Rudniki k. Częstochowy • Częstochowa Aniołów • CZĘSTOCHOWA

=== ŁÓDŹ – TOMASZÓW MAZOWIECKI - SPAŁA/RADOM (Pink) ===
ŁÓDŹ – TOMASZÓW MAZOWIECKI - SPAŁA/RADOM

ŁÓDŹ FABRYCZNA • Łódź Niciarniana • ŁÓDŹ WIDZEW • Łódź Andrzejów • Bedoń • Justynów • Gałkówek • Żakowice Południowe • Słotwiny • Mikołajów • Wykno • Zaosie • Skrzynki • TOMASZÓW MAZOWIECKI • Spała/Tomaszów Mazowiecki Białobrzegi • Brzustów • Antoniów • Dęba Opoczyńska • Radzice • DRZEWICA • Bieleny Opoczyńskie • Zygmuntów • Smogorzów Przysuski • Przysucha • Skrzynno • Wieniawa • Podbór • Chronów • Wolanów • Kończyce Radomskie • Kosów • Radom Potkanów • RADOM GŁÓWNY

=== ŁÓDŹ - ZDUŃSKA WOLA - CZĘSTOCHOWA (Brown) ===
ŁÓDŹ - PABIANICE - ŁASK - ZDUŃSKA WOLA - CZĘSTOCHOWA

ŁÓDŹ FABRYCZNA • Łódź Niciarniana •ŁÓDŹ WIDZEW • Łódź Zarzew • Łódź Dąbrowa • Łódź Chojny • Łódź Pabianicka • ŁÓDŹ KALISKA • Łódź Retkinia • Łódź Lublinek •Pabianice Północne • PABIANICE • Chechło • Dobroń • Kolumna • ŁASK • Borszewice • ZDUŃSKA WOLA • Zduńska Wola Karsznice • Zduńska Wola Południowa • Kozuby • Siedlce Łaskie • Chociw Łaski • Rusiec Łódzki • Huta • Chorzew Siemkowice • Biała Szlachecka • Wistka • Dubidze Kolonia • Dubidze • Nowa Brzeźnica • Ważne Młyny • Stary Broniszew • Cykarzew Północny • Stary Cykarzew • Mykanów • Rząsawa • Częstochowa Aniołów • CZĘSTOCHOWA

=== ŁÓDŹ – TOMASZÓW MAZOWIECKI - SKARŻYSKO KAMIENNA - KIELCE (Grey) ===
ŁÓDŹ – TOMASZÓW MAZOWIECKI - SKARŻYSKO KAMIENNA - KIELCE

ŁÓDŹ FABRYCZNA • Łódź Niciarniana • ŁÓDŹ WIDZEW • Łódź Andrzejów • Bedoń • Justynów • Gałkówek • Żakowice Południowe • Słotwiny • Mikołajów • Wykno • Zaosie • Skrzynki • TOMASZÓW MAZOWIECKI • Jeleń • Bratków • Tomaszówek • Szadkowice • Słomianka • OPOCZNO • Sitowa • Petrykozy • Ruda Białaczowska • Kornica • KOŃSKIE • Wąsosz Konecki • Czarniecka Góra • Stąporków • Wólka Plebańska • Sołtyków • Gilów • Bliżyn • Brzask • Skarżysko Milica • SKARŻYSKO KAMIENNA • Skarżysko Zachodnie • Suchedniów Północny • Suchedniów • Berezów • Łączna • Zagnańsk • Tumlin • Kostomłoty • Kielce Piaski • KIELCE GŁÓWNE
