= Szadkowski =

Szadkowski (feminine: Szadkowska) is a Polish locational surname and means a person from a place in Poland called Szadek, Szadki or Szadkowice. A variant: Szatkowski.

The surname may refer to:

- Mieczysław Szadkowski (1920–1990), Polish artist, sculptor, and educator
- Zuzanna Szadkowski (born 1978), American actress
- Zygmunt Szadkowski (1912–1995), Polish emigre politician, officer of the Polish Armed Forces in the West, social and scout activist
