= Szatkowski =

Szatkowski (feminine: Szatkowska) is a Polish locational surname, which is a variant of Szadkowski and means a person from a place in Poland called Szadek, Szadki or Szadkowice. Alternative spellings include Szatkowsky, Schatkowski and Schatkowsky. The surname may refer to:

- Anna Szatkowska (1928–2015), Polish writer
- Henryk Szatkowski, German politician
- Rob Szatkowski (born 1970), American wrestler
- Tomasz Szatkowski (born 1978), Polish politician and political scientist
- Zuzanna Szadkowski (born 1978), American actress
