= Gawronki =

Gawronki may refer to the following places in Poland:

- Gawronki, Lower Silesian Voivodeship (south-west Poland)
- Gawronki, Łódź Voivodeship (central Poland)
