= Gmina Sławno =

Gmina Sławno may refer to either of the following rural administrative districts in Poland:

- Gmina Sławno, Łódź Voivodeship
- Gmina Sławno, West Pomeranian Voivodeship
