= Miłaków, Świętokrzyskie Voivodeship =

Miłaków
- Village
- Location within Poland
- Coordinates: 51°16′51″N 20°27′25″E
- Country: Poland
- Voivodeship: Świętokrzyskie
- County: Końskie
- Gmina: Gowarczów
- Population: 160

Miłaków [miˈwakuf] is a village in the administrative district of Gmina Gowarczów, within Końskie County, Świętokrzyskie Voivodeship, in south-central Poland. It lies approximately 2 km (1 mi) east of Gowarczów, 10 km (6 mi) north of Końskie, and 46 km (29 mi) north of the regional capital Kielce.
