= Komaszyce, Świętokrzyskie Voivodeship =

Komaszyce
- Village
- Location within Poland
- Coordinates: 51°14′59″N 20°27′26″E
- Country: Poland
- Voivodeship: Świętokrzyskie
- County: Końskie
- Gmina: Gowarczów
- Population: 180

Komaszyce [kɔmaˈʂɨt͡sɛ] is a village in the administrative district of Gmina Gowarczów, within Końskie County, Świętokrzyskie Voivodeship, in south-central Poland. It lies approximately 4 km (2 mi) south-east of Gowarczów, 7 km (4 mi) north-east of Końskie, and 43 km (27 mi) north of the regional capital Kielce.
