= Borowiec, Końskie County =

Borowiec
- Village
- Location within Poland
- Coordinates: 51°17′4″N 20°24′7″E
- Country: Poland
- Voivodeship: Świętokrzyskie
- County: Końskie
- Gmina: Gowarczów
- Population: 210

Borowiec [bɔˈrɔvjɛt͡s] is a village in the administrative district of Gmina Gowarczów, within Końskie County, Świętokrzyskie Voivodeship, in south-central Poland. It lies approximately 3 km (2 mi) west of Gowarczów, 10 km (6 mi) north of Końskie, and 47 km (29 mi) north of the regional capital Kielce.
