= Kamienna Wola =

Kamienna Wola may refer to the following places:

- Kamienna Wola, Masovian Voivodeship (east-central Poland)
- Kamienna Wola, Gmina Gowarczów in Świętokrzyskie Voivodeship (south-central Poland)
- Kamienna Wola, Gmina Stąporków in Świętokrzyskie Voivodeship (south-central Poland)
