= Karasica =

Karasica may refer to:

- Karasica, Poland, a village in Poland
- Karašica, two rivers in Croatia and Hungary
