= Albinów =

Albinów may refer to the following places in Poland:

- Albinów, Lower Silesian Voivodeship (south-west Poland)
- Albinów, Łódź Voivodeship (central Poland)
- Albinów, Siedlce County in Masovian Voivodeship (east-central Poland)
- Albinów, Sokołów County in Masovian Voivodeship (east-central Poland)
