= Różany =

Różany may refer to the following places:

- Różany, Łódź Voivodeship (central Poland)
- Różany, Warmian-Masurian Voivodeship (north Poland)
- Różany, West Pomeranian Voivodeship (north-west Poland)
