= Morzywół =

- Village
- Location within Poland
- Coordinates: 51°15′4″N 20°26′8″E
- Country: Poland
- Voivodeship: Świętokrzyskie
- County: Końskie
- Gmina: Gowarczów
- Population: 130

Morzywół [mɔˈʐɨvuu̯] is a village in the administrative district of Gmina Gowarczów, within Końskie County, Świętokrzyskie Voivodeship, in south-central Poland. It lies approximately 4 km (2 mi) south of Gowarczów, 6 km (4 mi) north of Końskie, and 43 km (27 mi) north of the regional capital Kielce.
