= Bernów =

- Village
- Location within Poland
- Coordinates: 51°18′48″N 20°25′42″E
- Country: Poland
- Voivodeship: Świętokrzyskie
- County: Końskie
- Gmina: Gowarczów
- Population: 160

Bernów [ˈbɛrnuf] is a village in the administrative district of Gmina Gowarczów, within Końskie County, Świętokrzyskie Voivodeship, in south-central Poland. It lies approximately 4 km (2 mi) north of Gowarczów, 13 km (8 mi) north of Końskie, and 50 km (31 mi) north of the regional capital Kielce.
