= Bębnów, Świętokrzyskie Voivodeship =

Bębnów
- Village
- Location within Poland
- Coordinates: 51°14′51″N 20°24′17″E
- Country: Poland
- Voivodeship: Świętokrzyskie
- County: Końskie
- Gmina: Gowarczów
- Population: 712

Bębnów [ˈbɛmbnuf] is a village in the administrative district of Gmina Gowarczów, within Końskie County, Świętokrzyskie Voivodeship, in south-central Poland. It lies approximately 5 km (3 mi) south-west of Gowarczów, 6 km (4 mi) north of Końskie, and 44 km (27 mi) north of the regional capital Kielce.
