= Kurzacze, Końskie County =

Kurzacze
- Village
- Location within Poland
- Coordinates: 51°19′27″N 20°28′47″E
- Country: Poland
- Voivodeship: Świętokrzyskie
- County: Końskie
- Gmina: Gowarczów

Kurzacze [kuˈʐat͡ʂɛ] is a village in the administrative district of Gmina Gowarczów, within Końskie County, Świętokrzyskie Voivodeship, in south-central Poland. It lies approximately 6 km (4 mi) north-east of Gowarczów, 15 km (9 mi) north of Końskie, and 50 km (31 mi) north of the regional capital Kielce.
