= Rogówek, Świętokrzyskie Voivodeship =

Rogówek
- Village
- Location within Poland
- Coordinates: 51°16′13″N 20°27′49″E
- Country: Poland
- Voivodeship: Świętokrzyskie
- County: Końskie
- Gmina: Gowarczów
- Population: 90

Rogówek [rɔˈɡuvɛk] is a village in the administrative district of Gmina Gowarczów, within Końskie County, Świętokrzyskie Voivodeship, in south-central Poland. It lies approximately 2 km (1 mi) south-east of Gowarczów, 9 km (6 mi) north-east of Końskie, and 45 km (28 mi) north of the regional capital Kielce.
