= Olszewice =

Olszewice may refer to the following places:

- Olszewice, Kuyavian-Pomeranian Voivodeship (north-central Poland)
- Olszewice, Łódź Voivodeship (central Poland)
- Olszewice, Masovian Voivodeship (east-central Poland)
