= Giełzów, Świętokrzyskie Voivodeship =

Giełzów
- Village
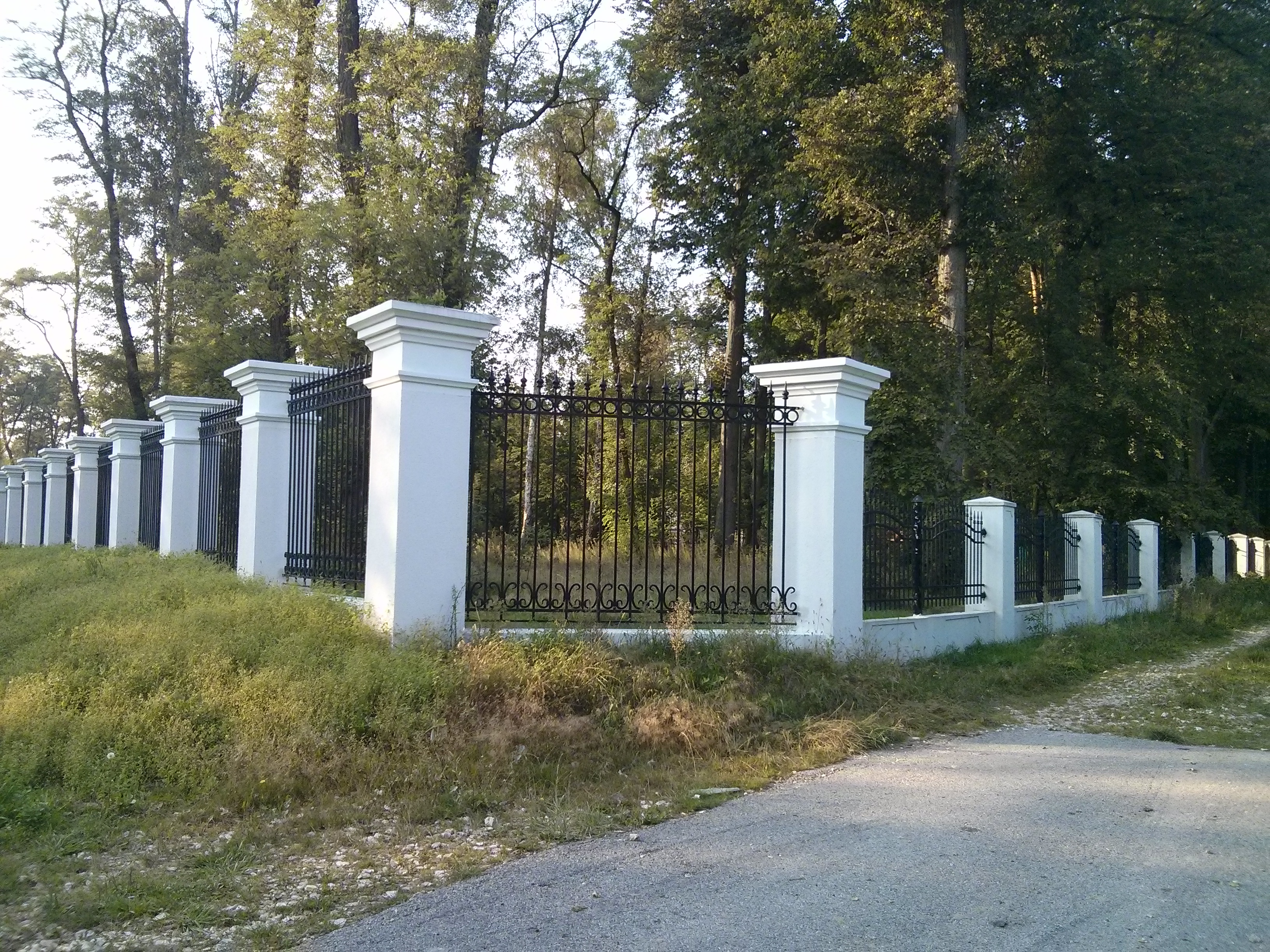
- Park

- Location within Poland
- Coordinates: 51°18′31″N 20°23′17″E
- Country: Poland
- Voivodeship: Świętokrzyskie
- County: Końskie
- Gmina: Gowarczów
- Population: 400

Giełzów [ˈɡʲɛu̯zuf] is a village in the administrative district of Gmina Gowarczów, within Końskie County, Świętokrzyskie Voivodeship, in south-central Poland. It lies approximately 5 km (3 mi) north-west of Gowarczów, 13 km (8 mi) north of Końskie, and 50 km (31 mi) north of the regional capital Kielce.
