= Skrzyszów =

Skrzyszów may refer to the following places in Poland:

- Skrzyszów, Lesser Poland Voivodeship (south Poland)
- Skrzyszów, Silesian Voivodeship (south Poland)
- Skrzyszów, Subcarpathian Voivodeship (south-east Poland)
- Skrzyszów, Świętokrzyskie Voivodeship (south-central Poland)
