= Brzeźnica, Świętokrzyskie Voivodeship =

Brzeźnica
- Village
- Location within Poland
- Coordinates: 51°16′12″N 20°28′57″E
- Country: Poland
- Voivodeship: Świętokrzyskie
- County: Końskie
- Gmina: Gowarczów
- Population: 120

Brzeźnica [bʐɛʑˈnit͡sa] is a village in the administrative district of Gmina Gowarczów, within Końskie County, Świętokrzyskie Voivodeship, in south-central Poland. It lies approximately 4 km (2 mi) east of Gowarczów, 10 km (6 mi) north-east of Końskie, and 44 km (27 mi) north of the regional capital Kielce.
