= Trojanów =

Trojanów may refer to the following places:

- Trojanów, Łódź Voivodeship (central Poland)
- Trojanów, Lublin Voivodeship (east Poland)
- Trojanów, Garwolin County in Masovian Voivodeship (east-central Poland)
- Trojanów, Mińsk County in Masovian Voivodeship (east-central Poland)
- Trojanów, Greater Poland Voivodeship (west-central Poland)
