= Popławy =

Popławy may refer to the following places:

- Popławy, Łódź Voivodeship (central Poland)
- Popławy, Chełm County in Lublin Voivodeship (east Poland)
- Popławy, Podlaskie Voivodeship (north-east Poland)
- Popławy, Łęczna County in Lublin Voivodeship (east Poland)
- Popławy, Masovian Voivodeship (east-central Poland)
