= Karašica =

Karašica may refer to:

- Karašica (Drava), a river in eastern Croatia
- Karašica (Danube), a river in southern Hungary and eastern Croatia

== See also ==
- Karasica
