= Korytków, Świętokrzyskie Voivodeship =

Korytków
- Village
- Location within Poland
- Coordinates: 51°17′51″N 20°26′20″E
- Country: Poland
- Voivodeship: Świętokrzyskie
- County: Końskie
- Gmina: Gowarczów
- Population: 330

Korytków [kɔˈrɨtkuf] is a village in the administrative district of Gmina Gowarczów, within Końskie County, Świętokrzyskie Voivodeship, in south-central Poland. It lies approximately 3 km (2 mi) north of Gowarczów, 11 km (7 mi) north of Końskie, and 48 km (30 mi) north of the regional capital Kielce.
