= Mąkolice, Zgierz County =

Mąkolice
- Village
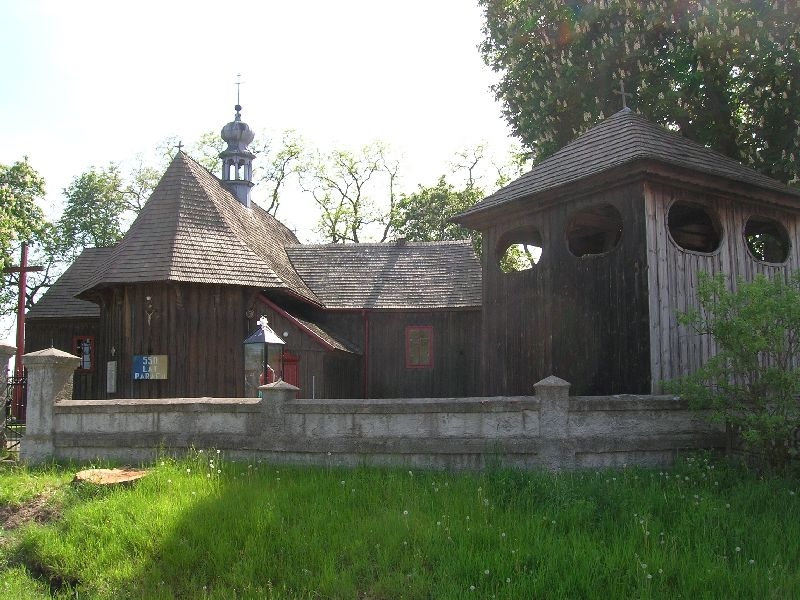
- Catholic church

- Location within Poland
- Coordinates: 52°0′42″N 19°34′6″E
- Country: Poland
- Voivodeship: Łódź
- County: Zgierz
- Gmina: Głowno
- Population: 1,250

Mąkolice [mɔŋkɔˈlit͡sɛ] is a village in the administrative district of Gmina Głowno, within Zgierz County, Łódź Voivodeship, in central Poland.
