= Sepno-Radonia =

- Village
- Location within Poland
- Coordinates: 51°23′36″N 20°04′48″E
- Country: Poland
- Voivodeship: Łódź
- County: Opoczno
- Gmina: Sławno

Sepno-Radonia [ˈsɛpnɔ raˈdɔɲa] is a village in the administrative district of Gmina Sławno, within Opoczno County, Łódź Voivodeship, in central Poland.
