= Kunice, Łódź Voivodeship =

Kunice
- Village
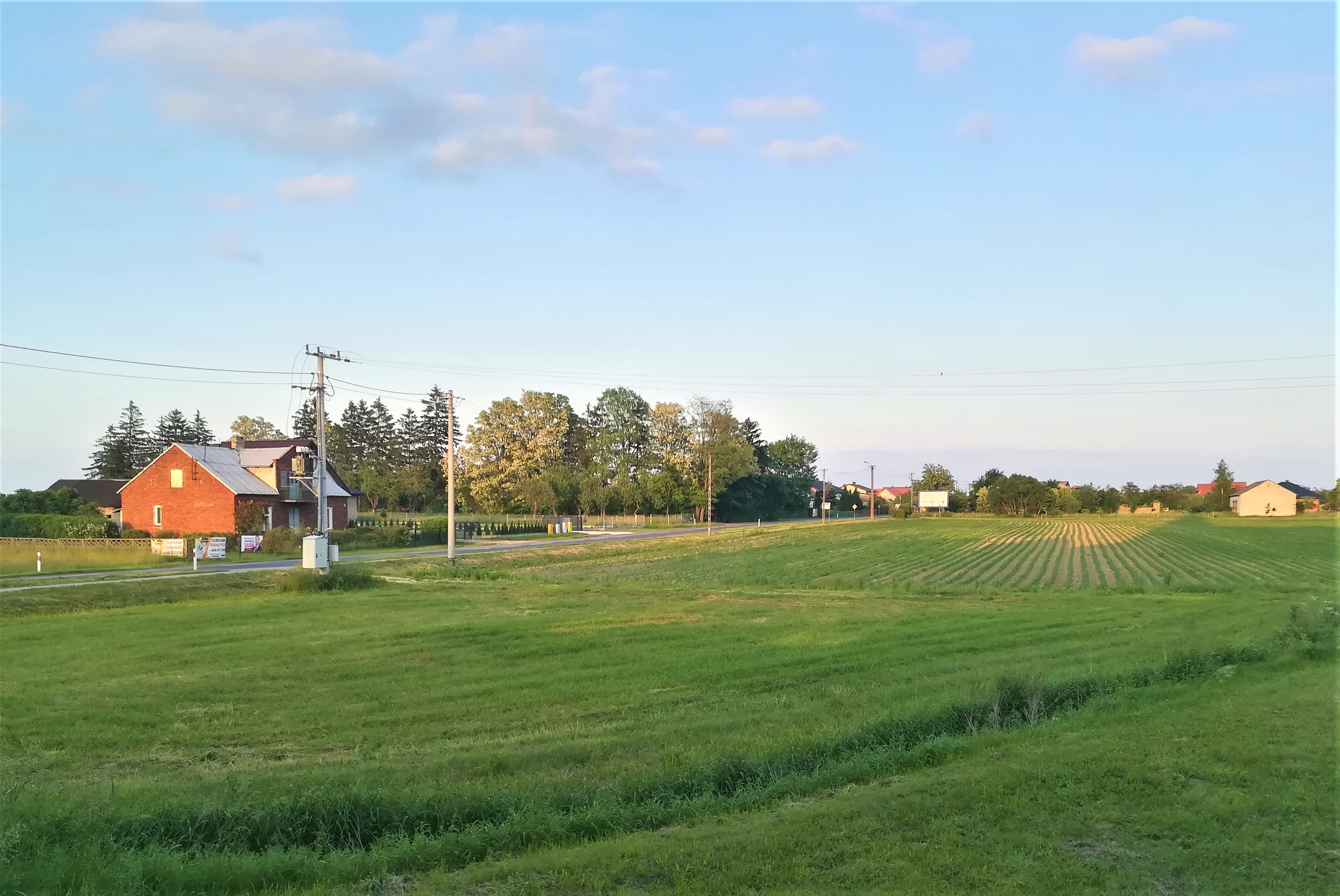

- Location within Poland
- Coordinates: 51°23′57″N 20°11′26″E
- Country: Poland
- Voivodeship: Łódź
- County: Opoczno
- Gmina: Sławno

Kunice [kuˈnit͡sɛ] is a village in the administrative district of Gmina Sławno, within Opoczno County, Łódź Voivodeship, in central Poland.
