= Antoniew, Gmina Głowno =

Antoniew
- Village
- Location within Poland
- Coordinates: 51°58′52″N 19°40′51″E
- Country: Poland
- Voivodeship: Łódź
- County: Zgierz
- Gmina: Głowno

Antoniew [anˈtɔɲɛf] is a village in the administrative district of Gmina Głowno, within Zgierz County, Łódź Voivodeship, in central Poland.
