= Kamilówka =

- Village
- Location within Poland
- Coordinates: 51°21′48″N 20°06′23″E
- Country: Poland
- Voivodeship: Łódź
- County: Opoczno
- Gmina: Sławno

Kamilówka [kamiˈlufka] is a village in the administrative district of Gmina Sławno, within Opoczno County, Łódź Voivodeship, in central Poland.
