= Wola Zbrożkowa =

- Village
- Location within Poland
- Coordinates: 52°0′N 19°43′E
- Country: Poland
- Voivodeship: Łódź
- County: Zgierz
- Gmina: Głowno
- Population: 270

Wola Zbrożkowa [ˈvɔla zbrɔʂˈkɔva] is a village in the administrative district of Gmina Głowno, within Zgierz County, Łódź Voivodeship, in central Poland.
