= Dąbrowa, Opoczno County =

Dąbrowa
- Village
- Location within Poland
- Coordinates: 51°20′22″N 20°08′57″E
- Country: Poland
- Voivodeship: Łódź
- County: Opoczno
- Gmina: Sławno

Dąbrowa [dɔmˈbrɔva] is a village in the administrative district of Gmina Sławno, within Opoczno County, Łódź Voivodeship, in central Poland.
