= Józefów, Opoczno County =

Józefów
- Village
- Location within Poland
- Coordinates: 51°21′04″N 20°12′17″E
- Country: Poland
- Voivodeship: Łódź
- County: Opoczno
- Gmina: Sławno

Józefów (Polish pronunciation: [juˈzɛfuf]) is a village in the administrative district of Gmina Sławno, within Opoczno County, Łódź Voivodeship, in central Poland.
