= Zygmunt Andrychiewicz =

Polish painter (1861–1943)

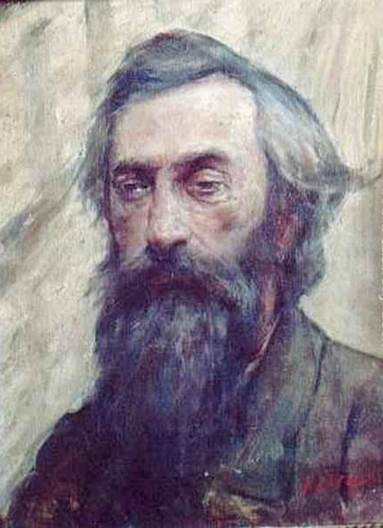
Self-portrait (date unknown)

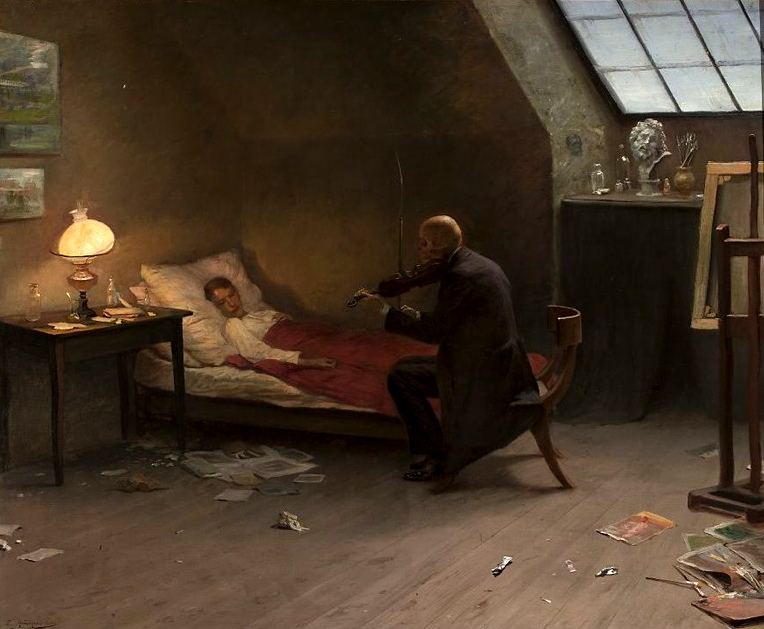
The Dying Artist

Zygmunt Andrychiewicz (27 May 1861 – 1943) was a Polish painter of portraits, landscapes, and genre scenes.

== Biography ==
He was born in Justynów. He began his studies at the Warsaw School of Drawing while working as a decorative painter. From 1884 to 1886, thanks to a scholarship from the "Towarzystwo Zachęty Sztuk Pięknych" (Society for Encouragement of the Fine Arts), he was able to continue his studies at the Kraków Academy of Fine Arts with Władysław Łuszczkiewicz and Izydor Jabłoński.

From 1887 to 1892, another scholarship enabled him to go to Paris, where he attended the Académie Colarossi and the Académie Julian, under the direction of William-Adolphe Bouguereau and Tony Robert-Fleury and shared a studio with Władysław Ślewiński. He had major showings at the Exposition Universelle (1889) and the Exposition Universelle (1900), as well as in Poland at the Zachęta National Gallery of Art in 1886.

From 1899 to 1918, he divided his time between Poland and France and made several visits to Italy. After 1918, he settled in Warsaw, where he became a drawing teacher at a girls' school and gave private lessons in his studio.

After his retirement, he bought a house in the village of Małków, near his birthplace, and continued to paint landscapes. In 1929, he had a major showing at the "General National Exhibition" in Poznań; celebrating ten years of Polish independence. He died in 1943, in Warta or Małków.
