= Karnków, Zgierz County =

Karnków
- Village
- Location within Poland
- Coordinates: 51°59′35″N 19°37′26″E
- Country: Poland
- Voivodeship: Łódź
- County: Zgierz
- Gmina: Głowno

Karnków [ˈkarnkuf] is a village in the administrative district of Gmina Głowno, within Zgierz County, Łódź Voivodeship, in central Poland.
