= Jasionna, Zgierz County =

Jasionna
- Village
- Location within Poland
- Coordinates: 52°01′40″N 19°33′53″E
- Country: Poland
- Voivodeship: Łódź
- County: Zgierz
- Gmina: Głowno

Jasionna [jaˈɕɔnna] is a village in the administrative district of Gmina Głowno, within Zgierz County, Łódź Voivodeship, in central Poland.
