= Psary, Opoczno County =

Psary
- Village
- Location within Poland
- Coordinates: 51°21′N 20°9′E
- Country: Poland
- Voivodeship: Łódź
- County: Opoczno
- Gmina: Sławno

Psary [ˈpsarɨ] is a village in the administrative district of Gmina Sławno, within Opoczno County, Łódź Voivodeship, in central Poland.
