= Konarzew, Zgierz County =

Konarzew
- Village
- Location within Poland
- Coordinates: 51°59′35″N 19°43′59″E
- Country: Poland
- Voivodeship: Łódź
- County: Zgierz
- Gmina: Głowno

Konarzew [kɔˈnaʐɛf] is a village in the administrative district of Gmina Głowno, within Zgierz County, Łódź Voivodeship, in central Poland.
