= Władysławów Bielawski =

- Village
- Location within Poland
- Coordinates: 52°0′58″N 19°43′3″E
- Country: Poland
- Voivodeship: Łódź
- County: Zgierz
- Gmina: Głowno

Władysławów Bielawski [vwadɨˈswavuf bjɛˈlafski] is a village in the administrative district of Gmina Głowno, within Zgierz County, Łódź Voivodeship, in central Poland.
