= Piaski Rudnickie =

- Village
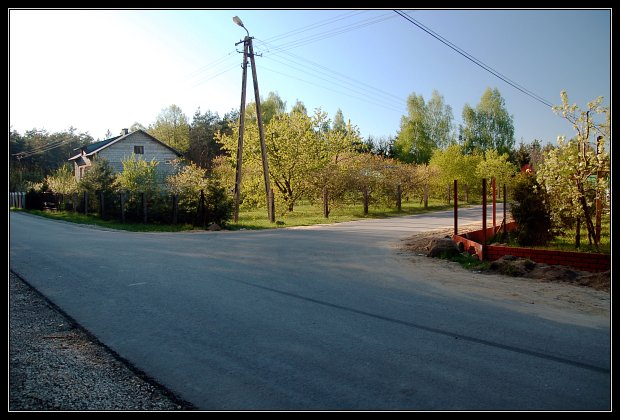

- Location within Poland
- Coordinates: 51°59′54″N 19°45′4″E
- Country: Poland
- Voivodeship: Łódź
- County: Zgierz
- Gmina: Głowno

Piaski Rudnickie (Polish pronunciation: [ˈpjaskʲi rudˈɲitskʲɛ]) is a village in the administrative district of Gmina Głowno, within Zgierz County, Łódź Voivodeship, in central Poland.
