= Owadów–Brzezinki site =

Jurassic fossil-bearing deposit in central Poland

The Owadów–Brzezinki site is a Jurassic fossil-bearing deposit cropping out in a quarry near the village of Owadów in central Poland.

== Description ==
The Owadów–Brzezinki palaeontological site is located in the Tomaszów Syncline in the northwestern margin of the Holy Cross Mountains, near the village of Owadów, approximately 90 km south-west from Warsaw. It is dated to the Late Jurassic or, more precisely, to the late Tithonian or middle Volgian. The discovery of this fossil-bearing deposit was announced by Adrian Kin and Błażej Błażejowski in 2012. The former palaeontologist died prematurely in 2013 and the fossil dragonfly Eumorbaeschna adriankini found at Owadów was named in his honour.

The biota discovered in the quarry at Owadów includes calpionelloids, foraminifers, bivalves, ammonites, ostracods, decapod crustaceans, horseshoe crabs, brachiopods, fish, turtle, ichthyosaurs, and representatives of other groups, many of them previously unknown. Remains of terrestrial animals were found too, including insects belonging to odonates and beetles.

== Importance ==
=== Scientific ===
Jurassic marine invertebrates are not cosmopolitan, but Boreal and Tethyan palaeobiogeographic Realms possess separate faunas. The differences can be so great that different stratigraphic schemes have long been in use (Tithonian vs. Volgian stages). The scientific importance of the Owadów–Brzezinki site is first of all in its location between the Boreal and Tethyan areas, which allows stratigraphic correlations.

A particularly important find is that of a Jurassic species of Limulus, which considerably extends the stratigraphic range of this genus.

=== Educational ===
An educational site, called "Owadów–Brzezinki Geopark" has been organised near the quarry. It includes a small museum, exhibiting fossils found at the site and reconstructions of extinct animals, as well as trails allowing panoramic views of the quarry.

== Bibliography ==
Błażejowski, B. et al. (2023) Summary of a decade of research at the Owadów–Brzezinki Lagerstätte
