= Ostrołęka, Zgierz County =

Ostrołęka
- Village
- Location within Poland
- Coordinates: 51°58′N 19°46′E
- Country: Poland
- Voivodeship: Łódź
- County: Zgierz
- Gmina: Głowno

Ostrołęka [ɔstrɔˈwɛŋka] is a village in the administrative district of Gmina Głowno, within Zgierz County, Łódź Voivodeship, in central Poland.
