= Grudzeń-Kolonia =

Village in Gmina Sławno, Poland

- Village
- Location within Poland
- Coordinates: 51°25′25″N 20°05′42″E
- Country: Poland
- Voivodeship: Łódź
- County: Opoczno
- Gmina: Sławno

Grudzeń-Kolonia [ˈɡrud͡zɛɲ kɔˈlɔɲa] is a village in the administrative district of Gmina Sławno, within Opoczno County, Łódź Voivodeship, in central Poland.
