= Kadzielin =

- Village
- Location within Poland
- Coordinates: 51°58′40″N 19°45′52″E
- Country: Poland
- Voivodeship: Łódź
- County: Zgierz
- Gmina: Głowno

Kadzielin [kaˈd͡ʑɛlin] is a village in the administrative district of Gmina Głowno, within Zgierz County, Łódź Voivodeship, in central Poland.
