= Sławno-Kolonia =

- Village
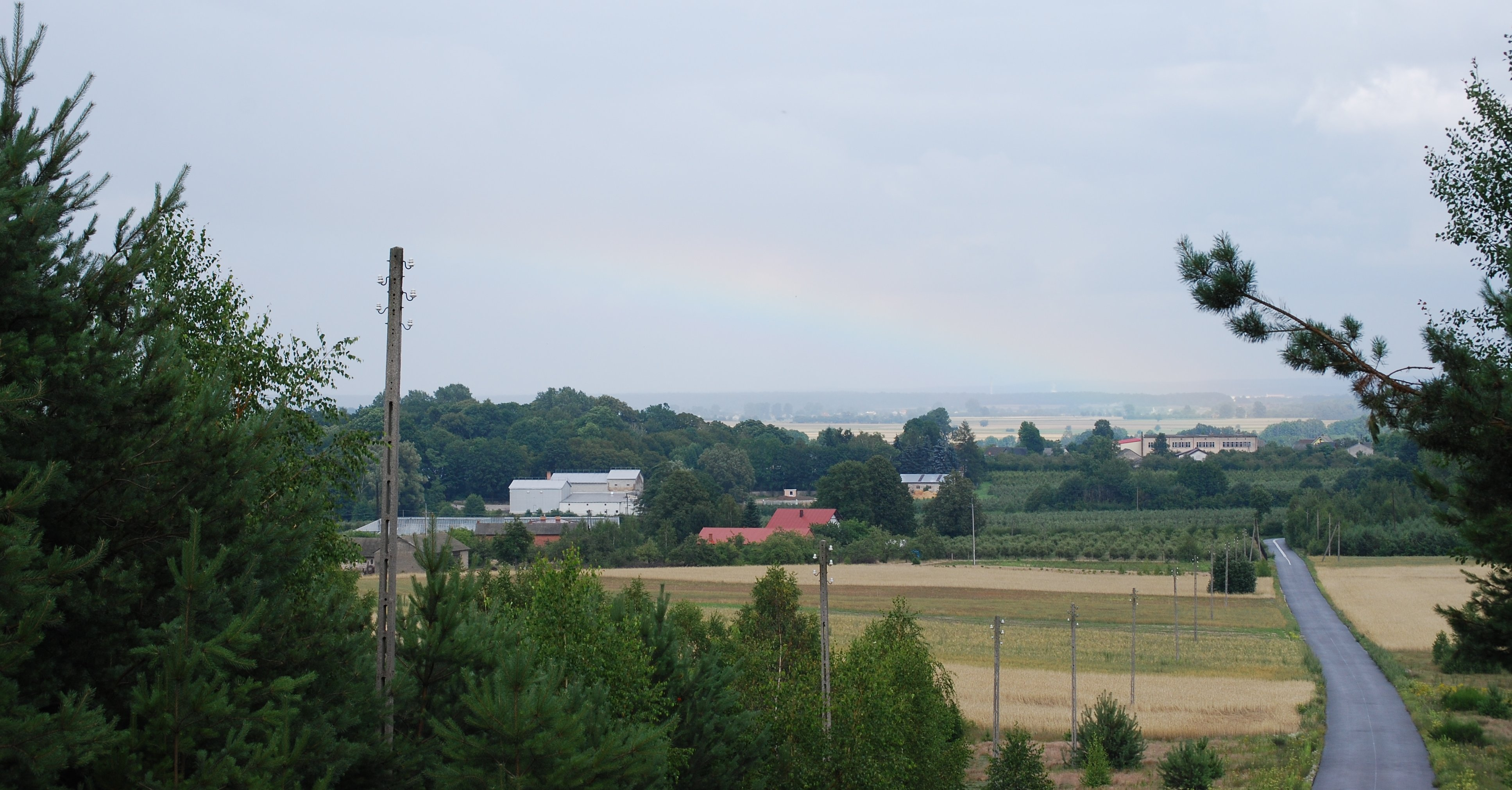

- Location within Poland
- Coordinates: 51°23′48″N 20°09′27″E
- Country: Poland
- Voivodeship: Łódź
- County: Opoczno
- Gmina: Sławno

Sławno-Kolonia [ˈswavnɔ kɔˈlɔɲa] is a village in the administrative district of Gmina Sławno, within Opoczno County, Łódź Voivodeship, in central Poland.
