= Sławno, Łódź Voivodeship =

Sławno
- Village
- Location within Poland
- Coordinates: 51°23′32″N 20°8′24″E
- Country: Poland
- Voivodeship: Łódź
- County: Opoczno
- Gmina: Sławno
- Population: 384

Sławno [ˈswavnɔ] is a village in Opoczno County, Łódź Voivodeship, in central Poland. It is the seat of the gmina (administrative district) called Gmina Sławno.
