= Antoniówka, Opoczno County =

Antoniówka
- Village
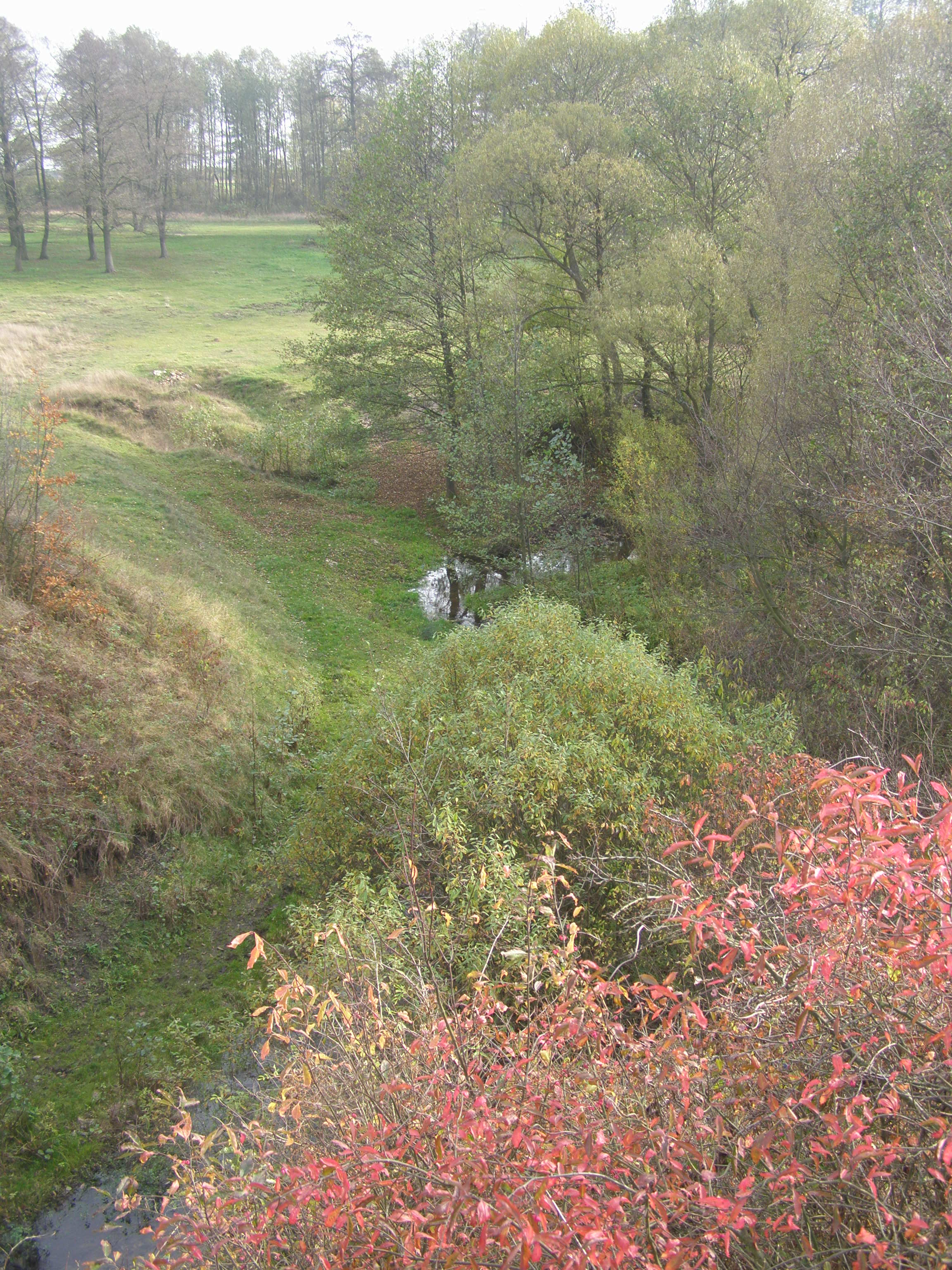

- Location within Poland
- Coordinates: 51°24′41″N 20°9′43″E
- Country: Poland
- Voivodeship: Łódź
- County: Opoczno
- Gmina: Sławno

Antoniówka [antɔˈɲufka] is a village in the administrative district of Gmina Sławno, within Opoczno County, Łódź Voivodeship, in central Poland.
