= Ostrożna =

- Village
- Location within Poland
- Coordinates: 51°24′37″N 20°08′36″E
- Country: Poland
- Voivodeship: Łódź
- County: Opoczno
- Gmina: Sławno

Ostrożna [ɔsˈtrɔʐna] is a village in the administrative district of Gmina Sławno, within Opoczno County, Łódź Voivodeship, in central Poland.
