= Ziewanice =

- Village
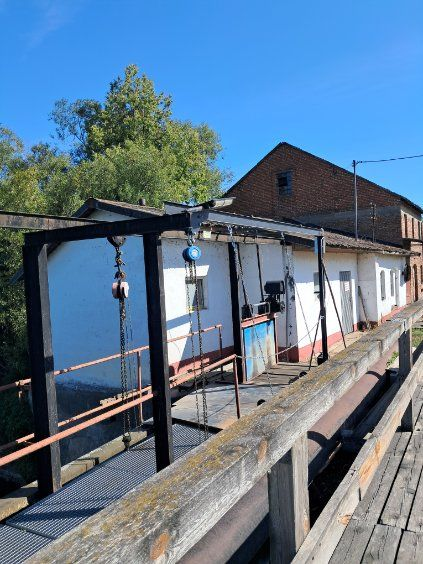

- Location within Poland
- Coordinates: 52°0′N 19°42′E
- Country: Poland
- Voivodeship: Łódź
- County: Zgierz
- Gmina: Głowno

Ziewanice [ʑɛvaˈnit͡sɛ] is a village in the administrative district of Gmina Głowno, within Zgierz County, Łódź Voivodeship, in central Poland.
