= Dąbrówka, Gmina Sławno =

Village in Gmina Sławno, Poland

Dąbrówka
- Village
- Location within Poland
- Coordinates: 51°25′43″N 20°11′48″E
- Country: Poland
- Voivodeship: Łódź
- County: Opoczno
- Gmina: Sławno

Dąbrówka [dɔmˈbrufka] is a village in the administrative district of Gmina Sławno, within Opoczno County, Łódź Voivodeship, in central Poland.
