= Grążowice =

Village in Gmina Sławno, Poland

- Village
- Location within Poland
- Coordinates: 51°22′08″N 20°11′46″E
- Country: Poland
- Voivodeship: Łódź
- County: Opoczno
- Gmina: Sławno

Grążowice [ɡrɔ̃ʐɔˈvit͡sɛ] is a village In the administrative district of Gmina Sławno, within Opoczno County, Łódź Voivodeship, in central Poland.
