= Gmina Gowarczów =

Gmina Gowarczów Gowarczów Commune
- Gmina
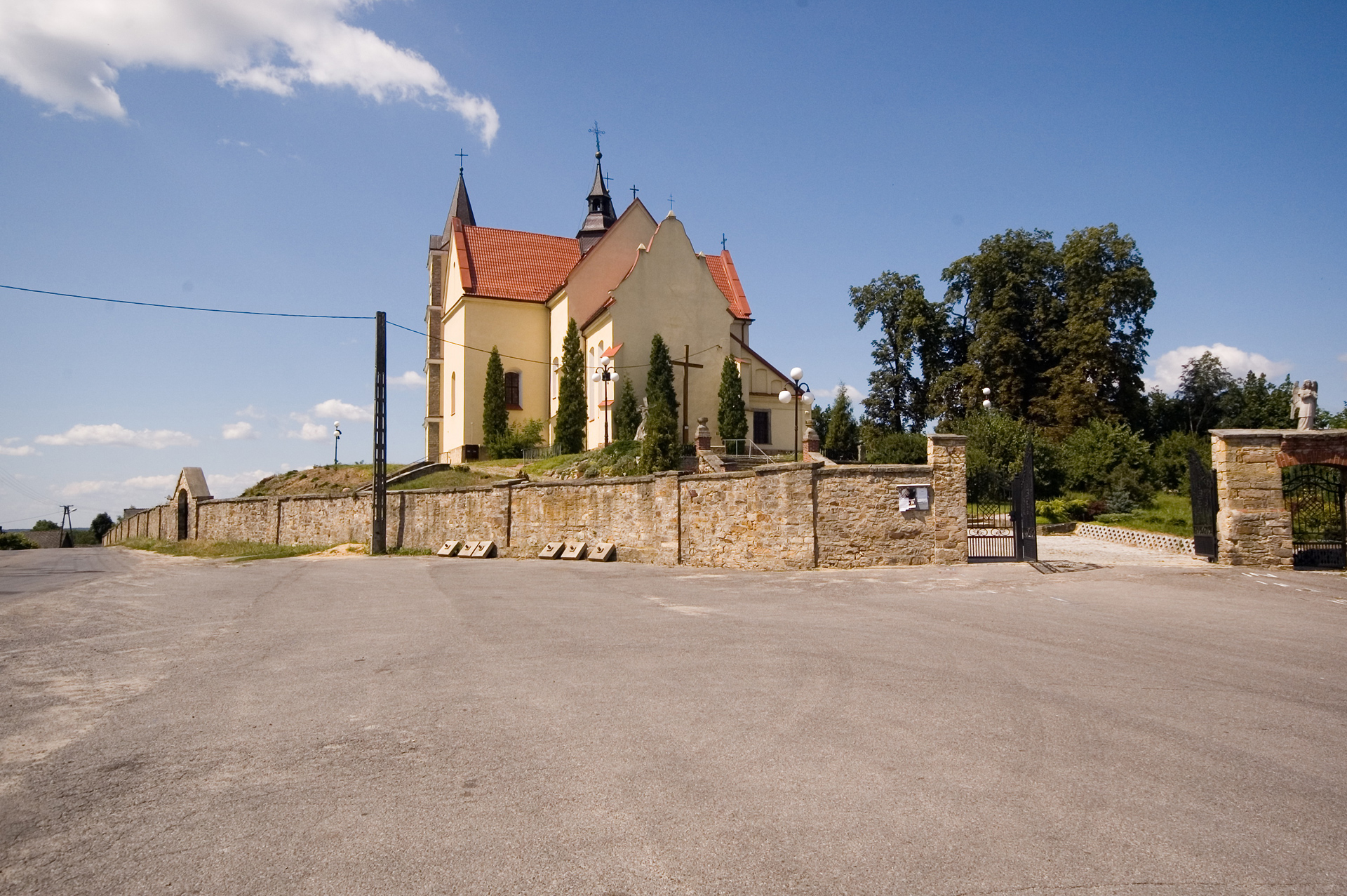
- Church of St. Peter and Paula in Gowarczów

- Coat of arms
- Interactive map of Gmina Gowarczów
- Coordinates (Gowarczów): 51°16′42″N 20°26′17″E
- Country: Poland
- Voivodeship: Świętokrzyskie
- County: Końskie
- Seat: Gowarczów

Area
  - Total: 101.98 km^{2} (39.37 sq mi)

Population (2006)
  - Total: 4,992
  - Density: 48.95/km^{2} (126.8/sq mi)
- Website: gowarczow.pl

Gmina Gowarczów is a rural gmina (administrative district) in Końskie County, Świętokrzyskie Voivodeship, in south-central Poland. Its seat is the village of Gowarczów, which lies approximately 9 kilometres (6 mi) north of Końskie and 46 km (29 mi) north of the regional capital Kielce.

The gmina covers an area of 101.98 square kilometres (39.4 sq mi), and as of 2006 its total population is 4,992.

== Villages ==
Gmina Gowarczów contains the villages and settlements of Bębnów, Bernów, Borowiec, Brzeźnica, Giełzów, Gowarczów, Kamienna Wola, Komaszyce, Korytków, Kupimierz, Kurzacze, Miłaków, Morzywół, Rogówek, Ruda Białaczowska and Skrzyszów.

== Neighbouring gminas ==
Gmina Gowarczów is bordered by the gminas of Białaczów, Gielniów, Końskie, Opoczno and Przysucha.
