= Władysławów Popowski =

- Village
- Location within Poland
- Coordinates: 52°0′34″N 19°36′46″E
- Country: Poland
- Voivodeship: Łódź
- County: Zgierz
- Gmina: Głowno

Władysławów Popowski [vwadɨˈswavuf pɔˈpɔfski] is a village in the administrative district of Gmina Głowno, within Zgierz County, Łódź Voivodeship, in central Poland.
