= Dąbrowa, Zgierz County =

Dąbrowa
- Village
- Location within Poland
- Coordinates: 52°1′32″N 19°36′28″E
- Country: Poland
- Voivodeship: Łódź
- County: Zgierz
- Gmina: Głowno

Dąbrowa [dɔmˈbrɔva] is a village in the administrative district of Gmina Głowno, within Zgierz County, Łódź Voivodeship, in central Poland.
