= Wygnanów, Gmina Sławno =

Wygnanów
- Village
- Location within Poland
- Coordinates: 51°24′01″N 20°07′53″E
- Country: Poland
- Voivodeship: Łódź
- County: Opoczno
- Gmina: Sławno

Wygnanów [vɨɡˈnanuf] is a village in the administrative district of Gmina Sławno, within Opoczno County, Łódź Voivodeship, in central Poland.
