= Ruda Białaczowska =

- Village
- Location within Poland
- Coordinates: 51°15′49″N 20°23′29″E
- Country: Poland
- Voivodeship: Świętokrzyskie
- County: Końskie
- Gmina: Gowarczów
- Population: 500

Ruda Białaczowska [ˈruda bjawaˈt͡ʂɔfska] is a village in the administrative district of Gmina Gowarczów, within Końskie County, Świętokrzyskie Voivodeship, in south-central Poland. It lies approximately 4 km (2 mi) south-west of Gowarczów, 8 km (5 mi) north of Końskie, and 46 km (29 mi) north of the regional capital Kielce.
