= Bronisławów, Zgierz County =

Bronisławów
- Village
- Location within Poland
- Coordinates: 51°58′30″N 19°40′21″E
- Country: Poland
- Voivodeship: Łódź
- County: Zgierz
- Gmina: Głowno

Bronisławów [brɔniˈswavuf] is a village in the administrative district of Gmina Głowno, within Zgierz County, Łódź Voivodeship, in central Poland.
