= Gmina Głowno =

Gmina Głowno Głowno Commune
- Gmina

- Flag Coat of arms
- Interactive map of Gmina Głowno
- Coordinates (Głowno): 51°57′51″N 19°42′42″E
- Country: Poland
- Voivodeship: Łódź
- County: Zgierz
- Seat: Głowno

Area
  - Total: 104.45 km^{2} (40.33 sq mi)

Population (2006)
  - Total: 4,956
  - Density: 47.45/km^{2} (122.9/sq mi)
- Time zone: UTC+1 (CET)
  - Summer (DST): UTC+2 (CEST)
- Website: www.glowno.bipst.pl

Gmina Głowno is a rural gmina (administrative district) in Zgierz County, Łódź Voivodeship, in central Poland. Its seat is the town of Głowno, although the town is not part of the territory of the gmina.

The gmina covers an area of 104.45 square kilometres (40.3 sq mi), and as of 2006 its total population is 4,956. In 2012, with 1815,58 PLN per person it was the second poorest "rural gmina" in Poland, according to:"Ranking Zamożności Samorządów 2012"

== Villages ==
Gmina Głowno contains the villages and settlements of:

- Albinów
- Antoniew
- Boczki Domaradzkie
- Boczki Zarzeczne
- Bronisławów
- Chlebowice
- Dąbrowa
- Domaradzyn
- Feliksów
- Gawronki
- Glinnik
- Helenów
- Jasionna
- Kadzielin
- Kamień
- Karasica
- Karnków
- Konarzew
- Lubianków
- Mąkolice
- Mięsośnia
- Ostrołęka
- Piaski Rudnickie
- Popów Głowieński
- Popówek Włościański
- Różany
- Rudniczek
- Władysławów Bielawski
- Władysławów Popowski
- Wola Lubiankowska
- Wola Mąkolska
- Wola Zbrożkowa
- Ziewanice

== Neighbouring gminas ==
Gmina Głowno is bordered by the town of Głowno and by the gminas of Bielawy, Dmosin, Domaniewice, Łyszkowice, Piątek, Stryków and Zgierz.
