= Owadów, Łódź Voivodeship =

Owadów
- Village
- Location within Poland
- Coordinates: 51°23′N 20°8′E
- Country: Poland
- Voivodeship: Łódź
- County: Opoczno
- Gmina: Sławno

Owadów [ɔˈvaduf] is a village in the administrative district of Gmina Sławno, within Opoczno County, Łódź Voivodeship, in central Poland.

An important palaeontological locality, the Owadów-Brzezinki fossil-bearing deposit, is situated nearby.
