= Olszowiec, Opoczno County =

Olszowiec
- Village
- Location within Poland
- Coordinates: 51°24′N 20°6′E
- Country: Poland
- Voivodeship: Łódź
- County: Opoczno
- Gmina: Sławno

Olszowiec [ɔlˈʂɔvjɛt͡s] is a village in the administrative district of Gmina Sławno, within Opoczno County, Łódź Voivodeship, in central Poland.
