= Lubianków =

- Village
- Location within Poland
- Coordinates: 51°57′N 19°47′E
- Country: Poland
- Voivodeship: Łódź
- County: Zgierz
- Gmina: Głowno
- Population (approx.): 304
- Postal code: 95-015

Lubianków [luˈbjaŋkuf] is a village in the administrative district of Gmina Głowno, within Zgierz County, Łódź Voivodeship, in central Poland.

In the village there is a primary school, named after Maria Konopnicka. The first school was established in the village in year 1918.

In 2011 the village had an approximate population of 304.
