= Ludwinów, Opoczno County =

Ludwinów
- Village
- Location within Poland
- Coordinates: 51°24′59″N 20°07′18″E
- Country: Poland
- Voivodeship: Łódź
- County: Opoczno
- Gmina: Sławno

Ludwinów [ludˈvinuf] is a village in the administrative district of Gmina Sławno, within Opoczno County, Łódź Voivodeship, in central Poland.
