= Popówek Włościański =

- Village
- Location within Poland
- Coordinates: 51°59′57″N 19°38′27″E
- Country: Poland
- Voivodeship: Łódź
- County: Zgierz
- Gmina: Głowno

Popówek Włościański (Polish pronunciation: [pɔˈpuvɛk fwɔɕˈtɕaj̃skʲi]) is a village in the administrative district of Gmina Głowno, within Zgierz County, Łódź Voivodeship, in central Poland.
