= Kamienna Wola, Gmina Gowarczów =

Kamienna Wola
- Village
- Location within Poland
- Coordinates: 51°19′47″N 20°26′32″E
- Country: Poland
- Voivodeship: Świętokrzyskie
- County: Końskie
- Gmina: Gowarczów
- Population: 330

Kamienna Wola [kaˈmjɛnna ˈvɔla] is a village in the administrative district of Gmina Gowarczów, within Końskie County, Świętokrzyskie Voivodeship, in south-central Poland. It lies approximately 6 km (4 mi) north of Gowarczów, 15 km (9 mi) north of Końskie, and 52 km (32 mi) north of the regional capital Kielce.
