= Popów Głowieński =

- Village
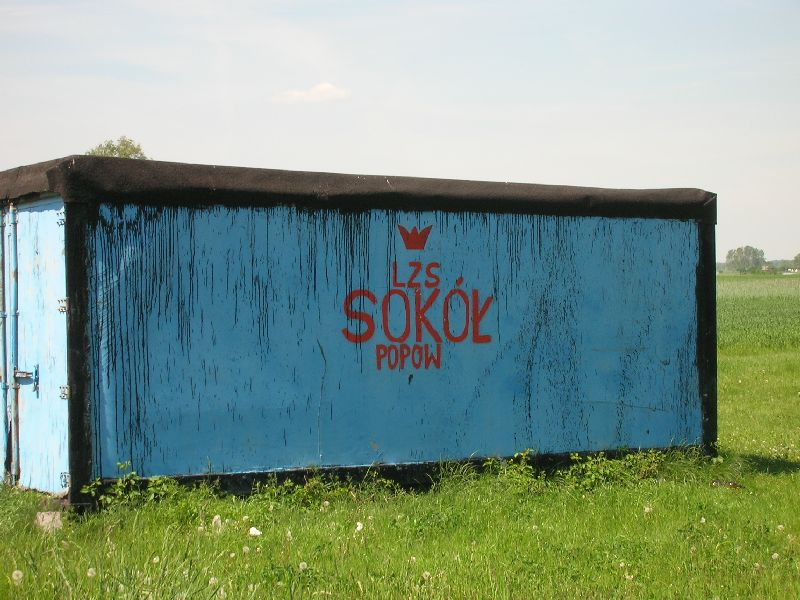

- Location within Poland
- Coordinates: 52°0′8″N 19°37′27″E
- Country: Poland
- Voivodeship: Łódź
- County: Zgierz
- Gmina: Głowno

Popów Głowieński [ˈpɔpuf ɡwɔˈvjɛɲski] is a village in the administrative district of Gmina Głowno, within Zgierz County, Łódź Voivodeship, in central Poland.
