= Zachorzów-Kolonia =

- Village
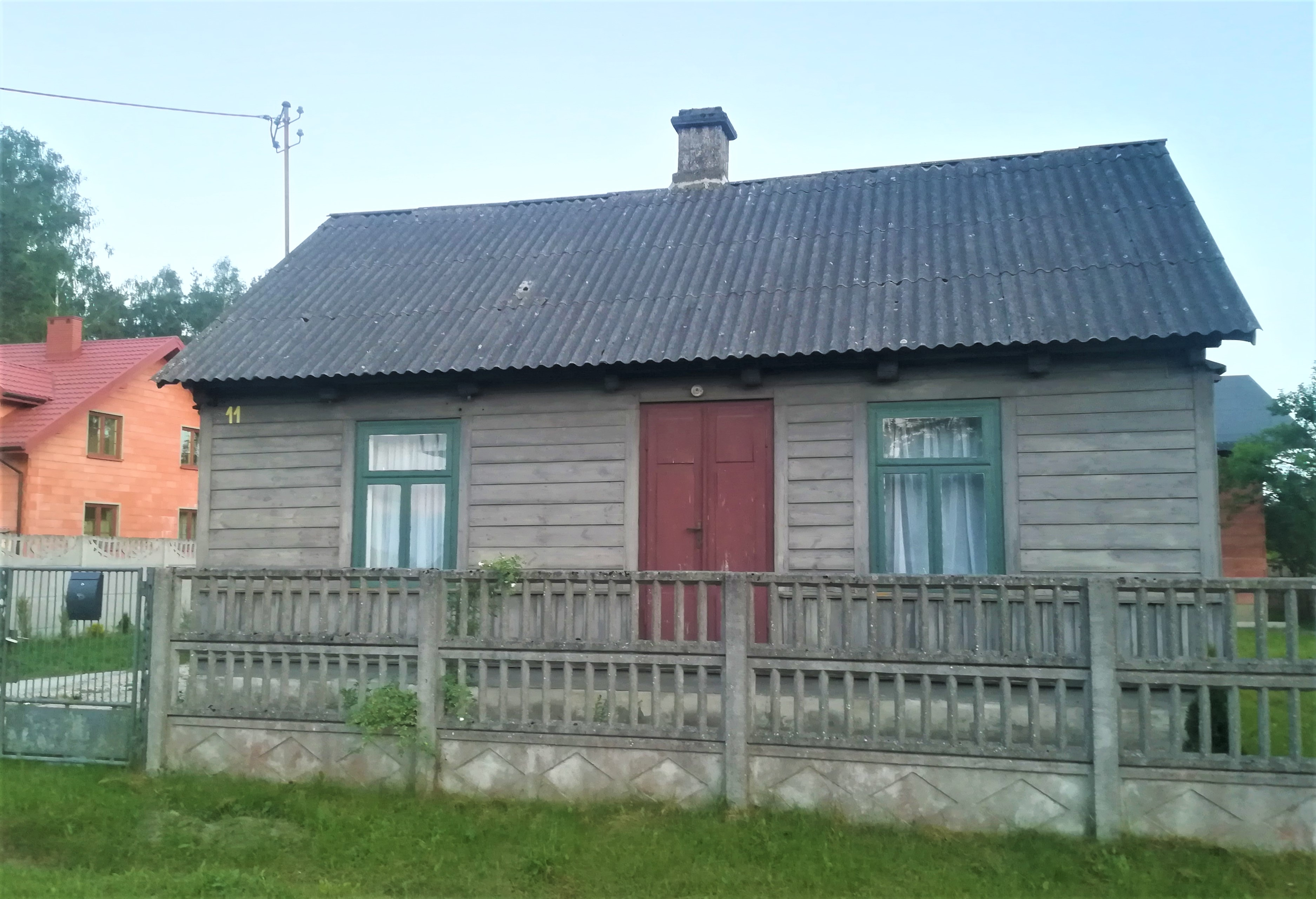

- Location within Poland
- Coordinates: 51°20′29″N 20°11′53″E
- Country: Poland
- Voivodeship: Łódź
- County: Opoczno
- Gmina: Sławno

Zachorzów-Kolonia [zaˈxɔʐuf kɔˈlɔɲa] is a village in the administrative district of Gmina Sławno, within Opoczno County, Łódź Voivodeship, in central Poland.
