= Helenów, Gmina Głowno =

Helenów
- Village
- Location within Poland
- Coordinates: 52°1′48″N 19°35′14″E
- Country: Poland
- Voivodeship: Łódź
- County: Zgierz
- Gmina: Głowno

Helenów [xɛˈlɛnuf] is a village in the administrative district of Gmina Głowno, within Zgierz County, Łódź Voivodeship, in central Poland.
