= Grudzeń-Las =

Village in Gmina Sławno, Poland

- Village
- Location within Poland
- Coordinates: 51°26′08″N 20°06′29″E
- Country: Poland
- Voivodeship: Łódź
- County: Opoczno
- Gmina: Sławno

Grudzeń-Las [ˈɡrud͡zɛɲ ˈlas] is a village in the administrative district of Gmina Sławno, within Opoczno County, Łódź Voivodeship, in central Poland.
