= Boczki Zarzeczne =

- Village
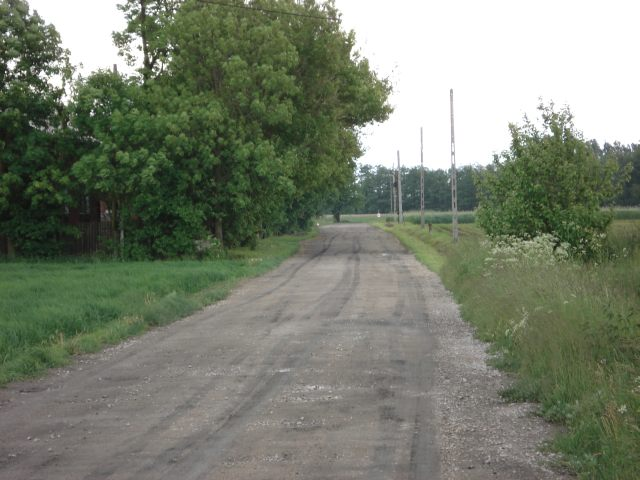

- Location within Poland
- Coordinates: 52°1′N 19°40′E
- Country: Poland
- Voivodeship: Łódź
- County: Zgierz
- Gmina: Głowno

Boczki Zarzeczne [ˈbɔt͡ʂki zaˈʐɛt͡ʂnɛ] is a village in the administrative district of Gmina Głowno, within Zgierz County, Łódź Voivodeship, in central Poland.
