= Wincentynów =

- Village
- Location within Poland
- Coordinates: 51°28′N 20°11′E
- Country: Poland
- Voivodeship: Łódź
- County: Opoczno
- Gmina: Sławno

Wincentynów [vint͡sɛnˈtɨnuf] is a village in the administrative district of Gmina Sławno, within Opoczno County, Łódź Voivodeship, in central Poland.
