= Kamień, Opoczno County =

Kamień
- Village
- Location within Poland
- Coordinates: 51°27′N 20°9′E
- Country: Poland
- Voivodeship: Łódź
- County: Opoczno
- Gmina: Sławno

Kamień (Polish pronunciation: [ˈkamjɛj̃]) is a village in the administrative district of Gmina Sławno, within Opoczno County, Łódź Voivodeship, in central Poland.
