= Skrzyszów, Świętokrzyskie Voivodeship =

Skrzyszów
- Village
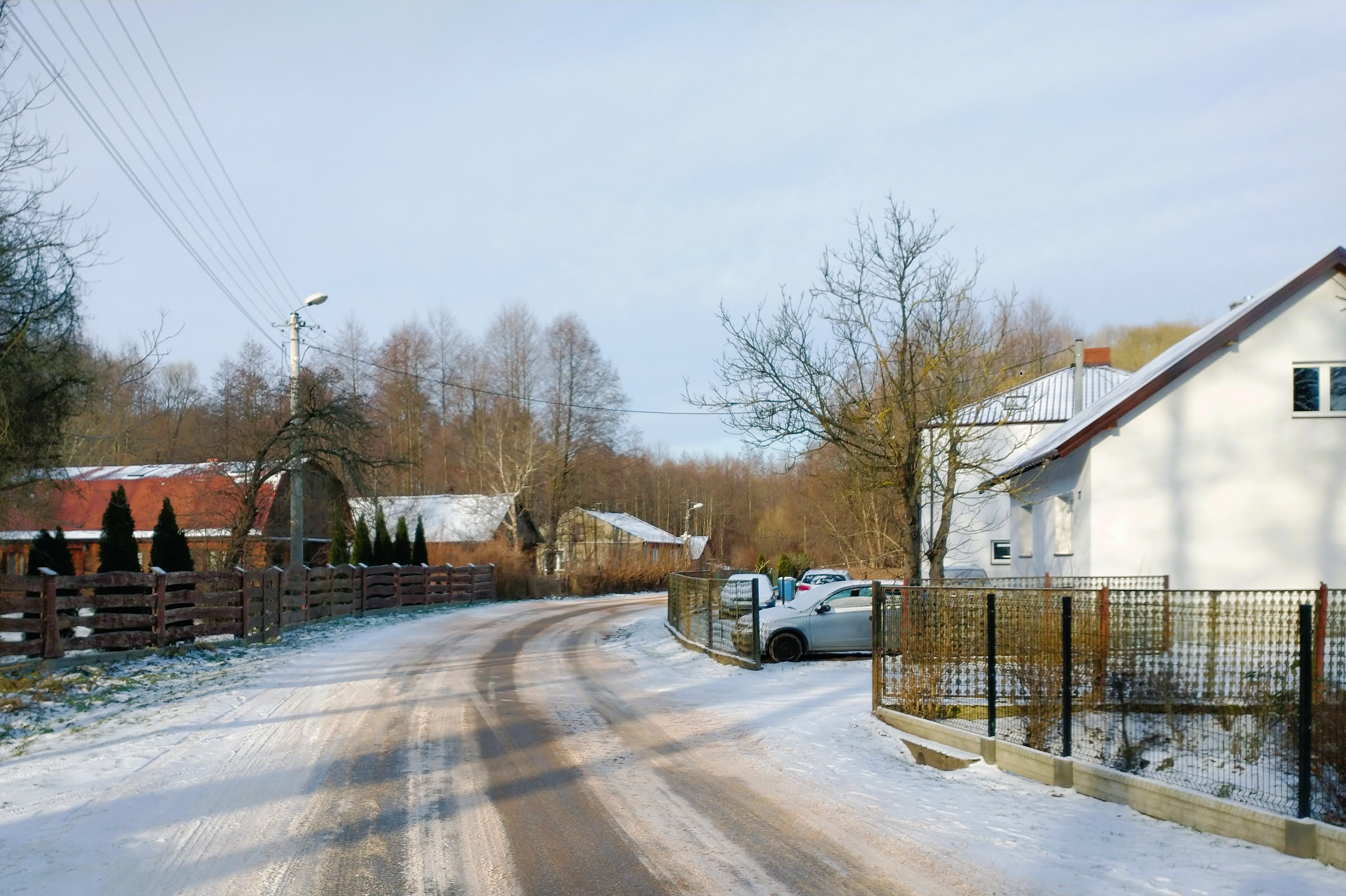

- Location within Poland
- Coordinates: 51°17′57″N 20°24′23″E
- Country: Poland
- Voivodeship: Świętokrzyskie
- County: Końskie
- Gmina: Gowarczów
- Population: 200

Skrzyszów [ˈskʂɨʂuf] is a village in the administrative district of Gmina Gowarczów, within Końskie County, Świętokrzyskie Voivodeship, in south-central Poland. It lies approximately 4 km (2 mi) north-west of Gowarczów, 12 km (7 mi) north of Końskie, and 49 km (30 mi) north of the regional capital Kielce.
