= Feliksów, Zgierz County =

Feliksów
- Village
- Location within Poland
- Coordinates: 51°58′45″N 19°32′3″E
- Country: Poland
- Voivodeship: Łódź
- County: Zgierz
- Gmina: Głowno

Feliksów (Polish pronunciation: [fɛˈliksuf]) is a village in the administrative district of Gmina Głowno, within Zgierz County, Łódź Voivodeship, in central Poland.
