= Albinów, Łódź Voivodeship =

Albinów
- Village
- Location within Poland
- Coordinates: 51°58′3″N 19°49′32″E
- Country: Poland
- Voivodeship: Łódź
- County: Zgierz
- Gmina: Głowno

Albinów [alˈbinuf] is a village in the administrative district of Gmina Głowno, within Zgierz County, Łódź Voivodeship, in central Poland.
