= Karasica, Poland =

Karasica
- Village
- Location within Poland
- Coordinates: 51°58′2″N 19°40′23″E
- Country: Poland
- Voivodeship: Łódź
- County: Zgierz
- Gmina: Głowno
- Website: www.glowno.pl

Karasica [karaˈɕit͡sa] is a village in the administrative district of Gmina Głowno, within Zgierz County, Łódź Voivodeship, in central Poland.
