= Justynów, Łódź East County =

Justynów
- Village
- Location within Poland
- Coordinates: 51°43′14″N 19°40′34″E
- Country: Poland
- Voivodeship: Łódź
- County: Łódź East
- Gmina: Andrespol

Population
  - Total: 2,349
- Postal code: 95-020
- Car plates: ELW

Justynów [jusˈtɨnuf] is a village in the administrative district of Gmina Andrespol, within Łódź East County, Łódź Voivodeship, in central Poland.

== Notable people ==
- Zygmunt Andrychiewicz, painter
