= Gawronki, Łódź Voivodeship =

Gawronki
- Village
- Location within Poland
- Coordinates: 52°0′37″N 19°40′35″E
- Country: Poland
- Voivodeship: Łódź
- County: Zgierz
- Gmina: Głowno

Gawronki [ɡaˈvrɔnki] is a village in the administrative district of Gmina Głowno, within Zgierz County, Łódź Voivodeship, in central Poland.
