= Nowy Bedoń =

- Village
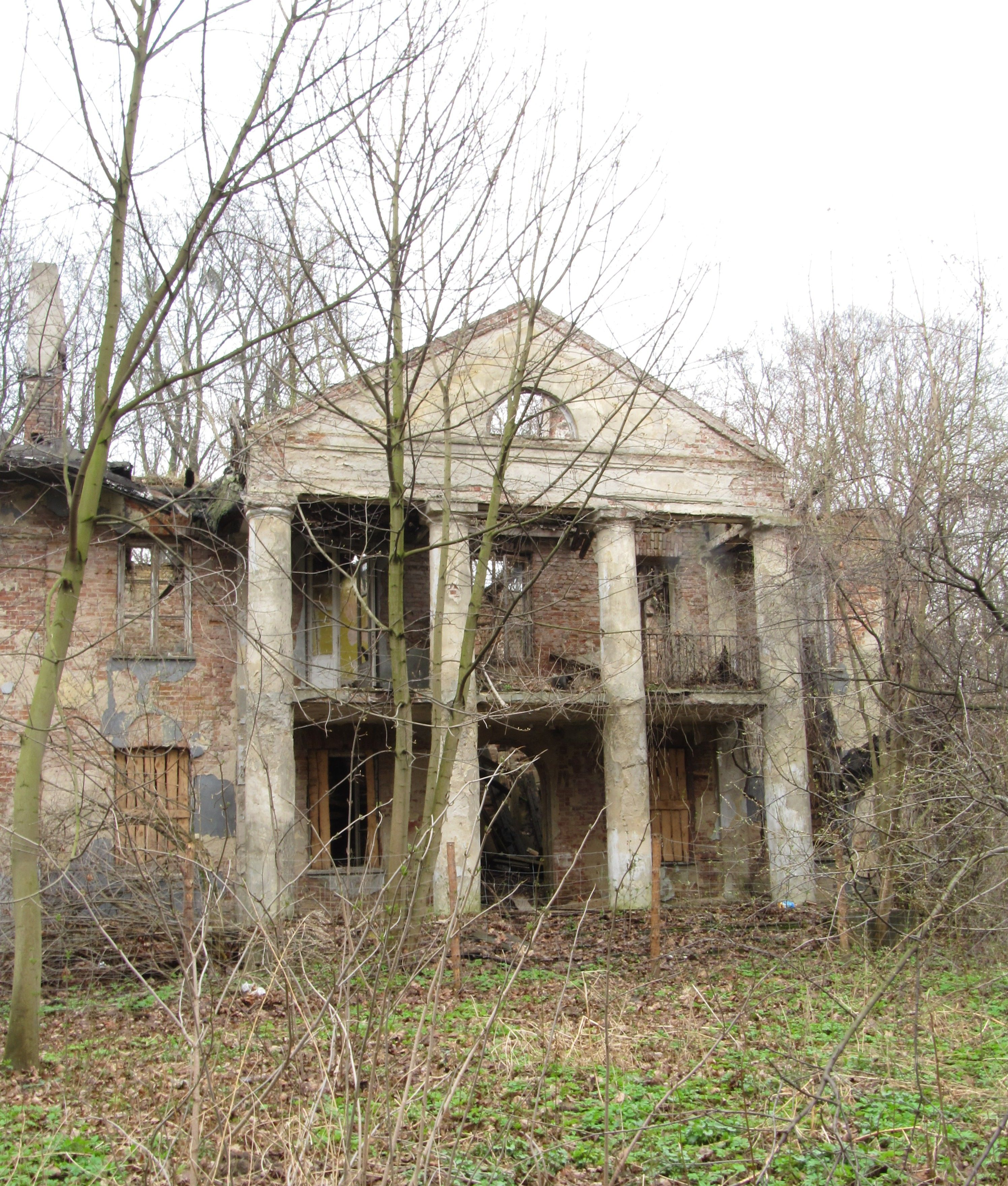
- Palace

- Location within Poland
- Coordinates: 51°44′7″N 19°39′11″E
- Country: Poland
- Voivodeship: Łódź
- County: Łódź East
- Gmina: Andrespol
- Population: 439

Nowy Bedoń [ˈnɔvɨ ˈbɛdɔɲ] is a village in the administrative district of Gmina Andrespol, within Łódź East County, Łódź Voivodeship, in central Poland.
