= Gałków Duży =

- Village
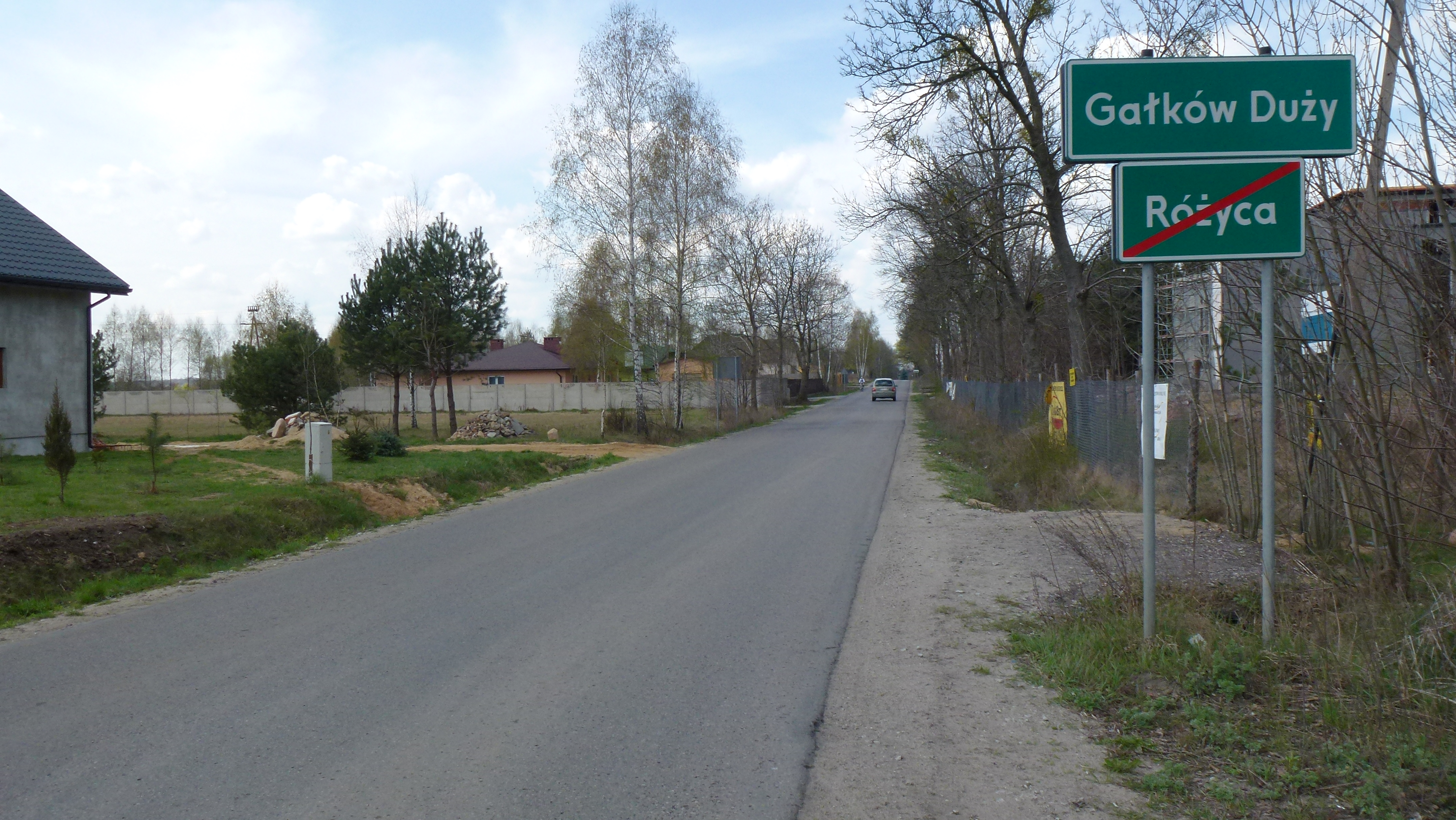

- Location within Poland
- Coordinates: 51°44′N 19°43′E
- Country: Poland
- Voivodeship: Łódź
- County: Łódź East
- Gmina: Koluszki

Gałków Duży [ˈɡau̯kuf ˈduʐɨ] (1943–1945German Galkau) is a village in the administrative district of Gmina Koluszki, within Łódź East County, Łódź Voivodeship, in central Poland.

== Development ==
In 2007, the Gałkówek train station and the ticket office building, which are based in Gałków Duży, were modernised, after being built around 100 years ago. The refurbishment was much needed and now the train station looks remarkably better than it did in the past.

During the past 15–20 years, not a huge amount has changed in Gałków Duży. As well as the modernisation of the train station, several new homes have been built and a few businesses have been set up in the area.

== Sports ==
At the very end of Ul. Glówna (where the forest begins), lies is a small football pitch which is used by the Galkowek football club. The club is based in the lower leagues of Polish football.
