= Karašica (Danube) =

River in Hungary

Karašica Karasica
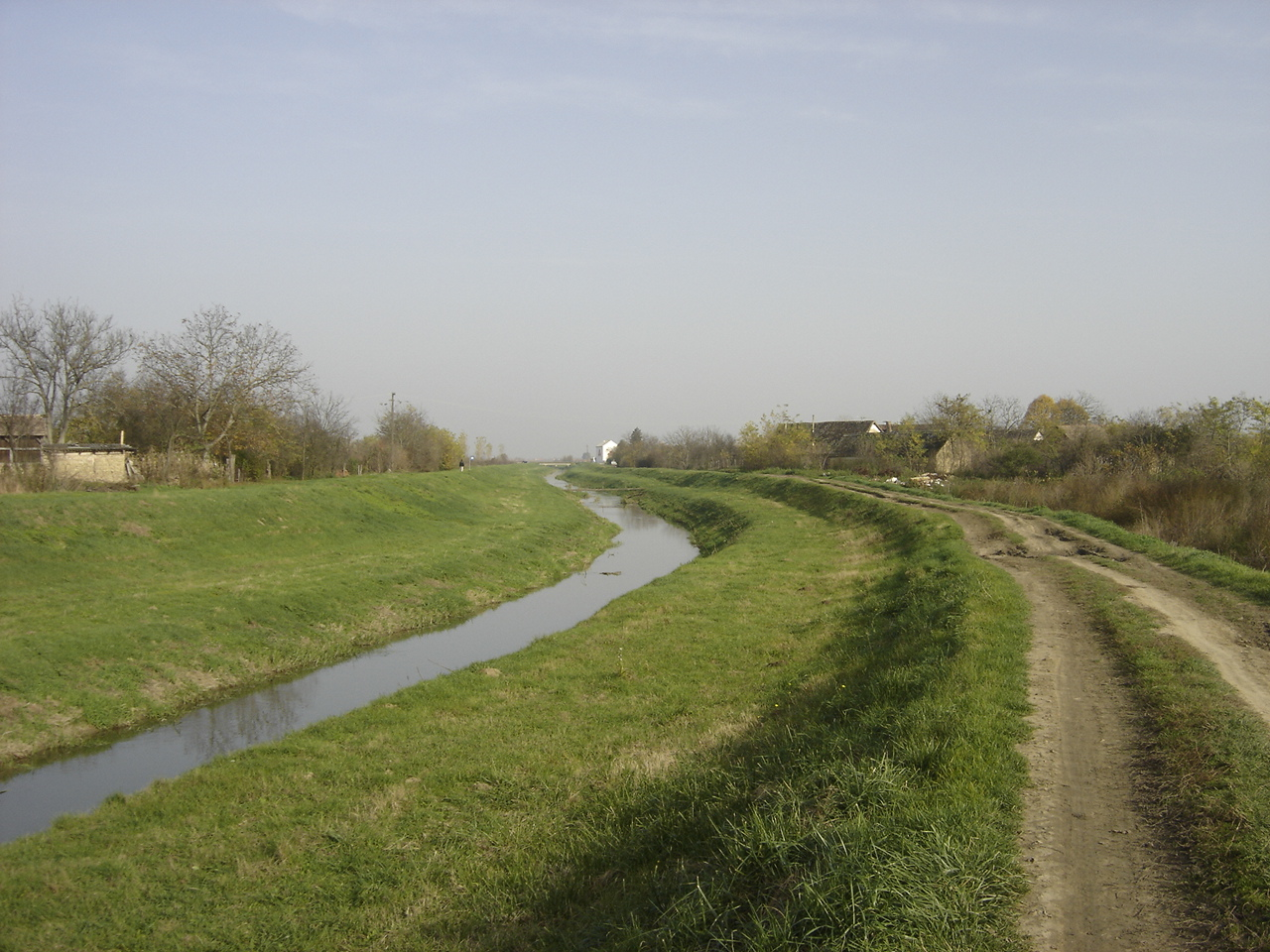
- Karašica near Branjin Vrh

Location
- Countries: Croatia; Hungary

Physical characteristics
- Mouth
  - location: Danube
  - coordinates: 45.8564°N 18.8494°E
- Length: 81 km (50 mi)

Basin features
- Progression: Danube→ Black Sea

Karašica (Croatian: Karašica, Hungarian: Karasica) or Baranjska Karašica or Karassó is a river in southern Hungary and eastern Croatia. It is 81 kilometres (50 mi) long, of which 30.46 km (18.93 mi) in Croatia. Its basin covers a total of 910 km^{2} (350 sq mi).

Karašica rises in the southern slopes of the Mecsek mountain in southern Hungary, near the village of Erdősmecske. It flows towards the south into a plain, through Szederkény, and its flow is regulated by man. It continues on through Villány, turns southeast and enters Croatia near the village of Luč and meanders in Baranja in an eastward direction. It passes near Popovac and Draž and flows into the Danube north of Batina.
