= Popławy, Łódź Voivodeship =

Popławy
- Village
- Location within Poland
- Coordinates: 51°22′N 20°7′E
- Country: Poland
- Voivodeship: Łódź
- County: Opoczno
- Gmina: Sławno

Popławy [pɔˈpwavɨ] is a village in the administrative district of Gmina Sławno, within Opoczno County, Łódź Voivodeship, in central Poland.
