= Mikołajów, Gmina Rokiciny =

Mikołajów
- Village
- Location within Poland
- Coordinates: 51°41′43″N 19°48′49″E
- Country: Poland
- Voivodeship: Łódź
- County: Tomaszów
- Gmina: Rokiciny

Mikołajów [mikɔˈwajuf] is a village in the administrative district of Gmina Rokiciny, within Tomaszów County, Łódź Voivodeship, in central Poland.
