= Różany, Łódź Voivodeship =

Różany
- Village
- Location within Poland
- Coordinates: 51°57′30″N 19°48′37″E
- Country: Poland
- Voivodeship: Łódź
- County: Zgierz
- Gmina: Głowno

Różany [ruˈʐanɨ] is a village in the administrative district of Gmina Głowno, within Zgierz County, Łódź Voivodeship, in central Poland.
