= Wykno, Gmina Ujazd =

Wykno
- Village
- Location within Poland
- Coordinates: 51°37′55″N 19°55′0″E
- Country: Poland
- Voivodeship: Łódź
- County: Tomaszów
- Gmina: Ujazd

Wykno [ˈvɨknɔ] is a village in the administrative district of Gmina Ujazd, within Tomaszów County, Łódź Voivodeship, in central Poland.
