= Kamień, Zgierz County =

Kamień
- Village
- Location within Poland
- Coordinates: 51°58′47″N 19°44′21″E
- Country: Poland
- Voivodeship: Łódź
- County: Zgierz
- Gmina: Głowno

Kamień (Polish pronunciation: [ˈkamjɛj̃]; also Kamień Łowicki) is a village in the administrative district of Gmina Głowno, within Zgierz County, Łódź Voivodeship, in central Poland.
