= Gmina Sławno, Łódź Voivodeship =

Gmina Sławno Sławno Commune
- Gmina
- Flag Coat of arms
- Interactive map of Gmina Sławno
- Coordinates (Sławno): 51°23′32″N 20°8′24″E
- Country: Poland
- Voivodeship: Łódź
- County: Opoczno
- Seat: Sławno

Area
  - Total: 128.45 km^{2} (49.59 sq mi)

Population (2006)
  - Total: 7,421
  - Density: 57.77/km^{2} (149.6/sq mi)
- Website: www.gminy.pl/slawno.lod

Gmina Sławno is a rural gmina (administrative district) in Opoczno County, Łódź Voivodeship, in central Poland. Its seat is the village of Sławno, which lies approximately 11 kilometres (7 mi) west of Opoczno and 64 km (40 mi) south-east of the regional capital Łódź.

The gmina covers an area of 128.45 square kilometres (49.6 sq mi), and as of 2006 its total population is 7,421.

The gmina contains part of the protected area called Spała Landscape Park.

== Villages ==
Gmina Sławno contains the villages and settlements of Antoninów, Antoniówka, Bratków, Celestynów, Dąbrowa, Dąbrówka, Gawrony, Grążowice, Grudzeń-Kolonia, Grudzeń-Las, Józefów, Kamień, Kamilówka, Kozenin, Kunice, Ludwinów, Olszewice, Olszowiec, Ostrożna, Owadów, Popławy, Prymusowa Wola, Psary, Sepno-Radonia, Sławno, Sławno-Kolonia, Szadkowice, Tomaszówek, Trojanów, Unewel, Wincentynów, Wygnanów, Zachorzów and Zachorzów-Kolonia.

== Neighbouring gminas ==
Gmina Sławno is bordered by the gminas of Białaczów, Inowłódz, Mniszków, Opoczno, Paradyż and Tomaszów Mazowiecki.
