= Żakowice, Łódź East County =

Żakowice
- Village
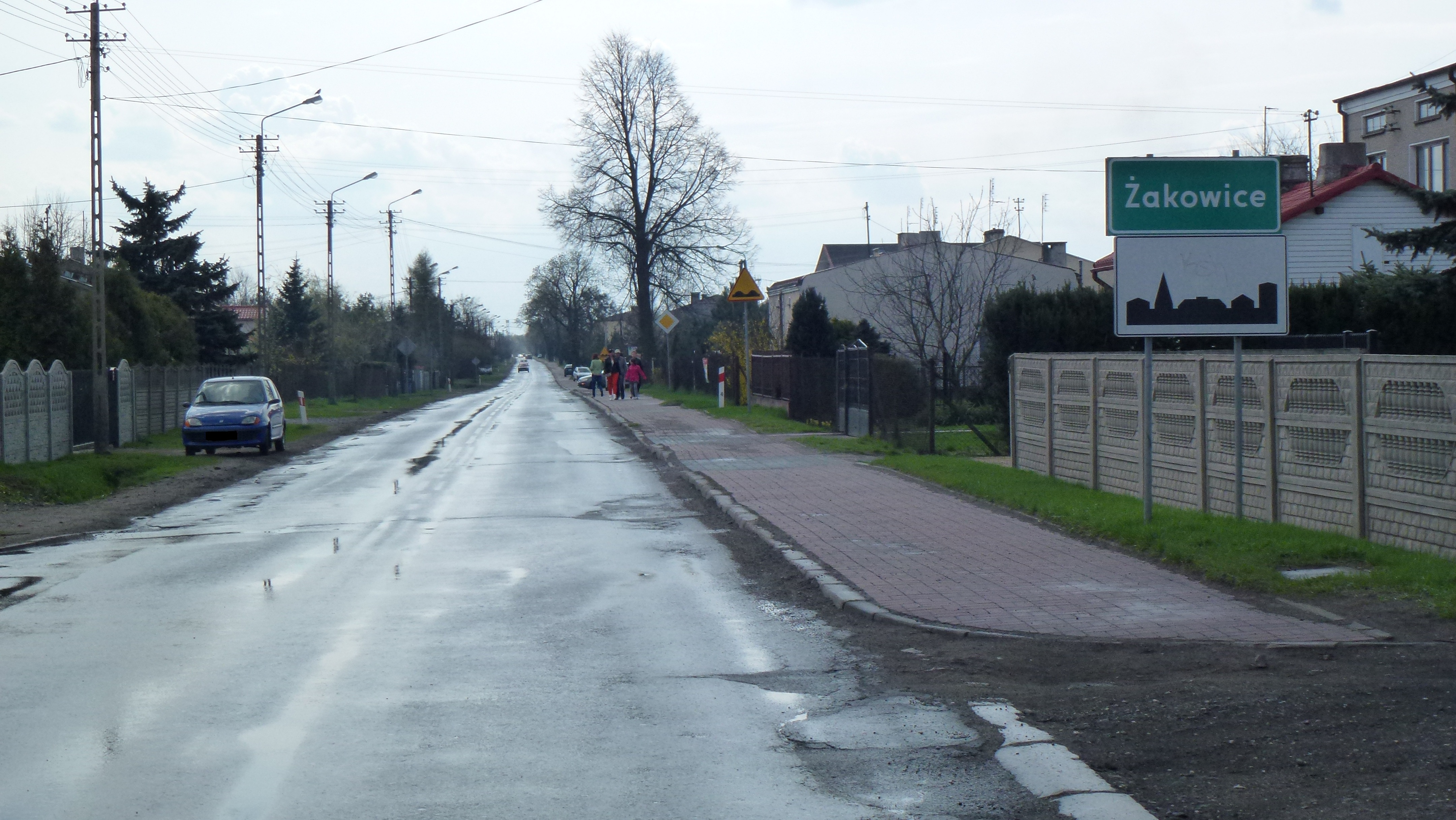

- Location within Poland
- Coordinates: 51°44′N 19°49′E
- Country: Poland
- Voivodeship: Łódź
- County: Łódź East
- Gmina: Koluszki

Żakowice [ʐakɔˈvit͡sɛ] is a village in the administrative district of Gmina Koluszki, within Łódź East County, Łódź Voivodeship, in central Poland.
