= Olszewice, Łódź Voivodeship =

Olszewice
- Village
- Location within Poland
- Coordinates: 51°26′56″N 20°05′49″E
- Country: Poland
- Voivodeship: Łódź
- County: Opoczno
- Gmina: Sławno

Olszewice [ɔlʂɛˈvit͡sɛ] is a village in the administrative district of Gmina Sławno, within Opoczno County, Łódź Voivodeship, in central Poland.
