= Bratków, Łódź Voivodeship =

Bratków
- Village
- Location within Poland
- Coordinates: 51°27′N 20°8′E
- Country: Poland
- Voivodeship: Łódź
- County: Opoczno
- Gmina: Sławno

Bratków [ˈbratkuf] is a village in the administrative district of Gmina Sławno, within Opoczno County, Łódź Voivodeship, in central Poland.
