= Słotwiny, Łódź Voivodeship =

Słotwiny
- Village
- Location within Poland
- Coordinates: 51°44′N 19°51′E
- Country: Poland
- Voivodeship: Łódź
- County: Łódź East
- Gmina: Koluszki

Słotwiny [swɔtˈfinɨ] is a village in the administrative district of Gmina Koluszki, within Łódź East County, Łódź Voivodeship, in central Poland.
