= Skrzynki, Tomaszów County =

Skrzynki
- Village
- Location within Poland
- Coordinates: 51°36′10″N 19°57′57″E
- Country: Poland
- Voivodeship: Łódź
- County: Tomaszów
- Gmina: Ujazd
- Population: 510

Skrzynki [ˈskʂɨŋki] is a village in the administrative district of Gmina Ujazd, Tomaszów County, Łódź Voivodeship, Poland.
