= Glinnik, Gmina Głowno =

Glinnik
- Village
- Location within Poland
- Coordinates: 51°59′37″N 19°39′43″E
- Country: Poland
- Voivodeship: Łódź
- Powiat: Zgierz
- Gmina: Głowno

Glinnik [ˈɡlinnik] is a village in the administrative district of Gmina Głowno, within Zgierz County, Łódź Voivodeship, in central Poland.
