= Szadek (disambiguation) =

Szadek may refer to the following places:

- Szadek, Gmina Blizanów in Greater Poland Voivodeship (west-central Poland)
- Szadek, Gmina Ceków-Kolonia in Greater Poland Voivodeship (west-central Poland)
- Szadek in Łódź Voivodeship (central Poland)
