= Szadki =

- Village
- Location within Poland
- Coordinates: 52°30′18″N 20°59′35″E
- Country: Poland
- Voivodeship: Masovian
- County: Legionowo
- Gmina: Serock
- Population: 130

Szadki [ˈʂatki] is a village in the administrative district of Gmina Serock, within Legionowo County, Masovian Voivodeship, in east-central Poland.
