= Szadkowice, Opoczno County =

Szadkowice
- Village
- Location within Poland
- Coordinates: 51°25′22″N 20°10′6″E
- Country: Poland
- Voivodeship: Łódź
- County: Opoczno
- Gmina: Sławno
- Population (approx.): 280

Szadkowice [ʂatkɔˈvit͡sɛ] is a village in the administrative district of Gmina Sławno, within Opoczno County, Łódź Voivodeship, in central Poland.

The village has an approximate population of 280.
