= Gowarczów =

- Town
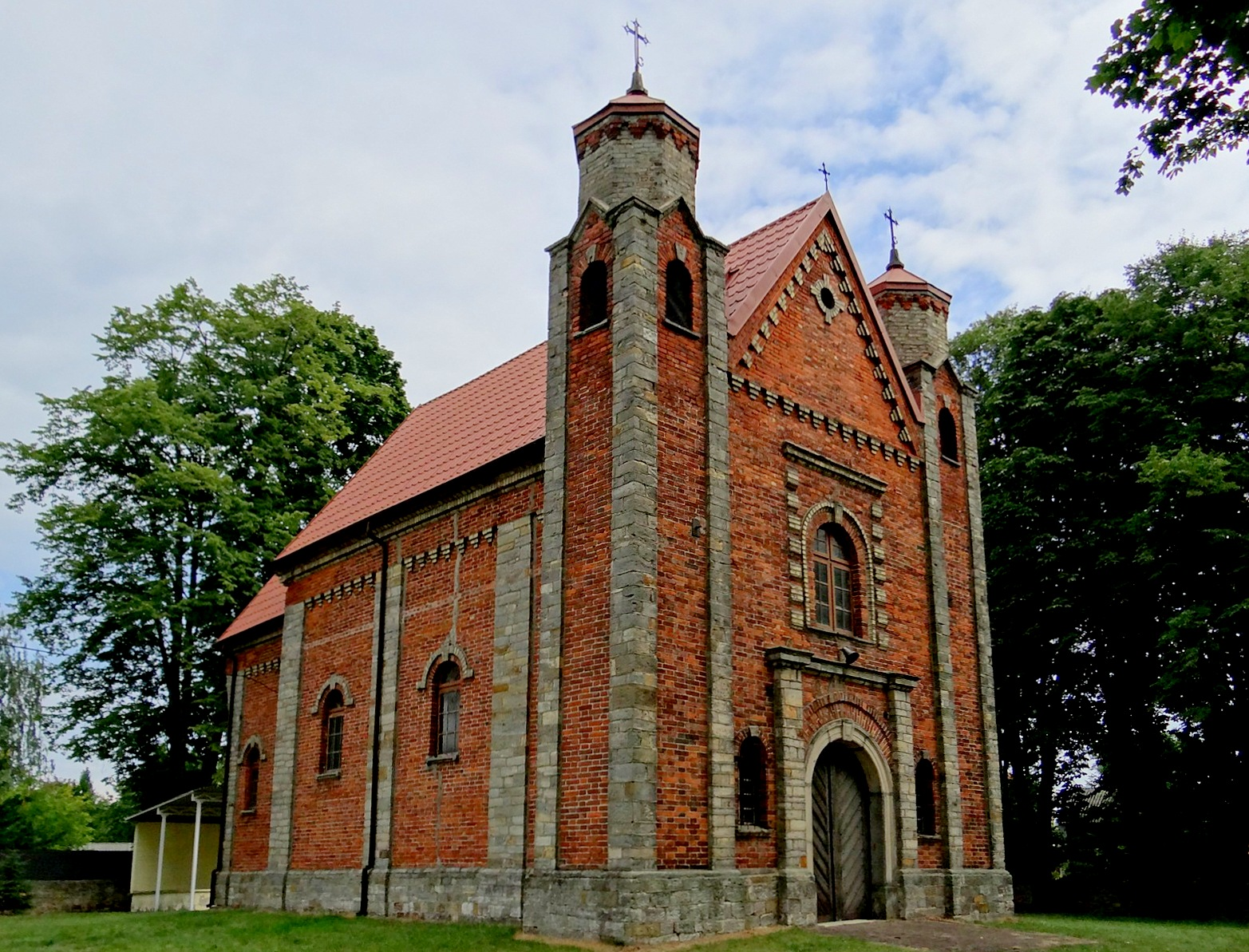
- Saint Roch church in Gowarczów

- Flag Coat of arms

- Location within Poland
- Coordinates: 51°16′42″N 20°26′17″E
- Country: Poland
- Voivodeship: Świętokrzyskie
- County: Końskie
- Gmina: Gowarczów
- Town rights: 1430-1829 od 2024

Population
  - Total: 10,297
- Time zone: UTC+1 (CET)
  - Summer (DST): UTC+2 (CEST)
- Vehicle registration: TKN

Gowarczów [ɡɔˈvart͡ʂuf] is a town in Końskie County, Świętokrzyskie Voivodeship, in south-central Poland. It is the seat of the gmina (administrative district) called Gmina Gowarczów. It lies in historic Lesser Poland, approximately 9 km (6 mi) north of Końskie and 46 km (29 mi) north of the regional capital Kielce.

== History ==
The history of Gowarczów dates back to the late Middle Ages, when a defensive gord was established here in the 12th century. In the 14th century, Gowarczów became the seat of a Roman Catholic parish church, and in 1430, the village received Magdeburg rights from King Władysław II Jagiełło, upon request of its owner Krystyna Magara. Soon afterwards, Gowarczow became property of the Bninski family. It remained a small town, whose residents were mostly farmers. Until the Partitions of Poland, it belonged to the Opoczno County of the Sandomierz Voivodeship of the Lesser Poland Province, and in 1662 its population was 374.

In the second half of the 18th century, the Jabłonowski family built here a bloomery, later a blast furnace. Soon afterwards, Gowarczów became part of Russian-controlled Congress Poland, and in 1869, following the January Uprising, it was stripped of its town charter. The town has a St. Peter and Paul parish church from the 14th century. It was remodelled in ca. 1640, and partly burned in a 1767 fire. The church was rebuilt and expanded in 1902–1904.

Following the joint German-Soviet invasion of Poland, which started World War II in September 1939, Gowarczów was occupied by Germany until 1945.

== Transport ==
Gowarczów lies on voivodeship road 728.

The nearest railway station is in Końskie.
