= Łaszew =

Łaszew may refer to:

- Łaszew, Greater Poland Voivodeship
- Łaszew, Łódź Voivodeship
