= Strugi =

Strugi may refer to the following villages in Poland:

- Strugi, Łódź Voivodeship (central Poland)
- Strugi, Masovian Voivodeship (east-central Poland)
- Strugi, Otwock County in Masovian Voivodeship (east-central Poland)
- Strugi, Greater Poland Voivodeship (west-central Poland)
