= Krzeczów =

Krzeczów may refer to the following places:

- Krzeczów, Bochnia County in Lesser Poland Voivodeship (south Poland)
- Krzeczów, Myślenice County in Lesser Poland Voivodeship (south Poland)
- Krzeczów, Łódź Voivodeship (central Poland)
