= Andrzej Gajewski =

Andrzej Gajewski may refer to:

- Andrzej Gajewski (politician), Polish politician
- Andrzej Gajewski (canoeist), Polish canoeist
