= Łódź Lublinek railway station =

Railway station in Łódź, Poland

Coordinates: 51°43′15″N 19°21′34″E

Łódź Lublinek
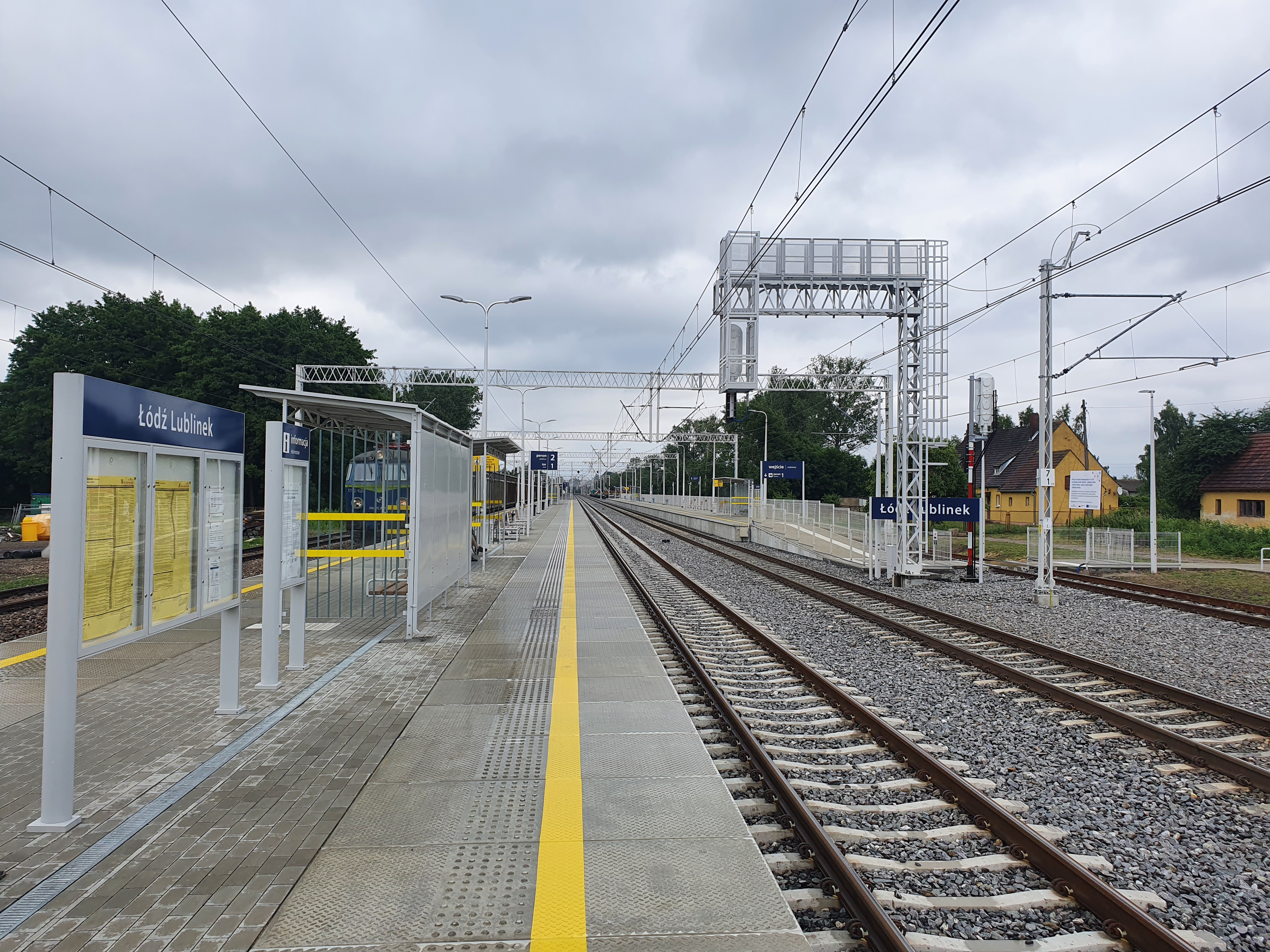

General information
- Location: Łódź, Poland
- Owner: Polish State Railways
- Line: 14 Łódź-Tuplice railway
- Platforms: 2
- Tracks: 6

History
- Opened: 1941
- Electrified: 1965
- Former names: Nertal (1942-1945); Lublinek (1951-2020)

Services
Preceding station	Polregio	Following station
Pabianice towards Ostrów Wielkopolski or Poznań Główny	IR	Łódź Retkinia towards Warszawa Główna
Pabianice towards Ostrów Wielkopolski or Poznań Główny	PR	Łódź Retkinia towards Łódź Kaliska
Preceding station	ŁKA	Following station
Łódź Retkinia towards Łódź Widzew	Łódź - Sieradz	Pabianice towards Sieradz
Location

Łódź Lublinek (formerly Lublinek) is a railway station located on the outskirts of Łódź, Poland, in Polesie district, approx. 9 km from the city center, and in the direct vicinity of Łódź Władysław Reymont Airport.

The station was created in the early 1940s by Germans as part of the wartime Program Otto, rebuilding the existing site of the railway crossing site into a pre-interchange stopping point. On the sides of mainline tracks, two additional tracks were created, along with signalling control buildings and living quarters for personnel. During the war the station received the name Nertal (meaning The Valley of Ner). In 1951, the station received the name Lublinek, along with two narrow side platforms set between the tracks of the station, beginning its passenger service. Two additional tracks were built in the late 1970s.

The station serves ŁKA regional trains travelling from Łódź Kaliska station to Sieradz, and is a stopping point for freight trains, having 4 tracks for their needs. The only functioning branch line coming out of station serves an aggregate dump ramp located in Smulsko. An inactive branch track leads to a traction substation. Before the 1980s, a branch line to a pottery plant was served by the station; currently, the line is dismantled, and the only existing remains of it are rails crossing Maratońska street, located in parallel to the railway line, and a pavement following the earlier line of the tracks. The station is served by MPK Łódź bus line 68, running from Retkinia to Port Łódź shopping centre in Chocianowice (68A) or an intersection of Pabianicka and Dubois streets in Górna (68B).

Despite being incorporated into the city of Łódź in 1988, the station did not have the prefix "Łódź" in its name until 14. June 2020, when the current name was introduced after publishing the new timetable. From 2020 to 2021, the station went through capital reconstruction.

== Train services ==
The station is served by the following services:

- InterRegio services (IR) Ostrów Wielkopolski — Łódź — Warszawa Główna
- InterRegio services (IR) Poznań Główny — Ostrów Wielkopolski — Łódź — Warszawa Główna
- Regiona services (PR) Łódź Kaliska — Ostrów Wielkopolski
- Regional services (PR) Łódź Kaliska — Ostrów Wielkopolski — Poznań Główny
