= Marian Gała =

Voivode of Białystok Voivodeship
- In office 1986–1990
- Preceded by: Kazimierz Dunaj
- Succeeded by: Stanisław Prutis

Personal details
- Born: May 3, 1935 Kraszkowice, Second Polish Republic
- Died: 14 November 1992 (aged 57)
- Resting place: Skierniewice, Poland
- Party: Polish United Workers' Party
- Awards: Order of Polonia Restituta; Cross of Merit

Marian Gała (born May 3, 1935 in Kraszkowice - November 14, 1992) was a Polish politician, vice-voivode of Skierniewice Voivodeship (1975–1981), vice minister of education from 1982 to 1986 and voivode of Białystok Voivodeship from 1986 to 1990.

== Biography ==
Since the 1950s, he worked as a teacher and principal of primary schools in the Łódź Voivodeship. In the period 1973–1975, he served as chairman of the Presidium of the National Council in Wieluń and head of the city and commune. In 1975 to 1981, he was appointed vice-voivode of Skierniewice Voivodeship. In the years 1982–1986, he served as undersecretary of state in the Ministry of Education. From 1986 to 1990 he was the Voivode of Białystok Voivodeship. He died in 1992 and was buried in Skierniewice.

He was awarded the Officer's and Knight's Cross of the Order of Polonia Restituta and the silver Cross of Merit.
