= Łódź Retkinia railway station =

Railway station in Łódź, Poland

Coordinates: 51°44′25.1″N 19°24′23″E

Łódź Retkinia
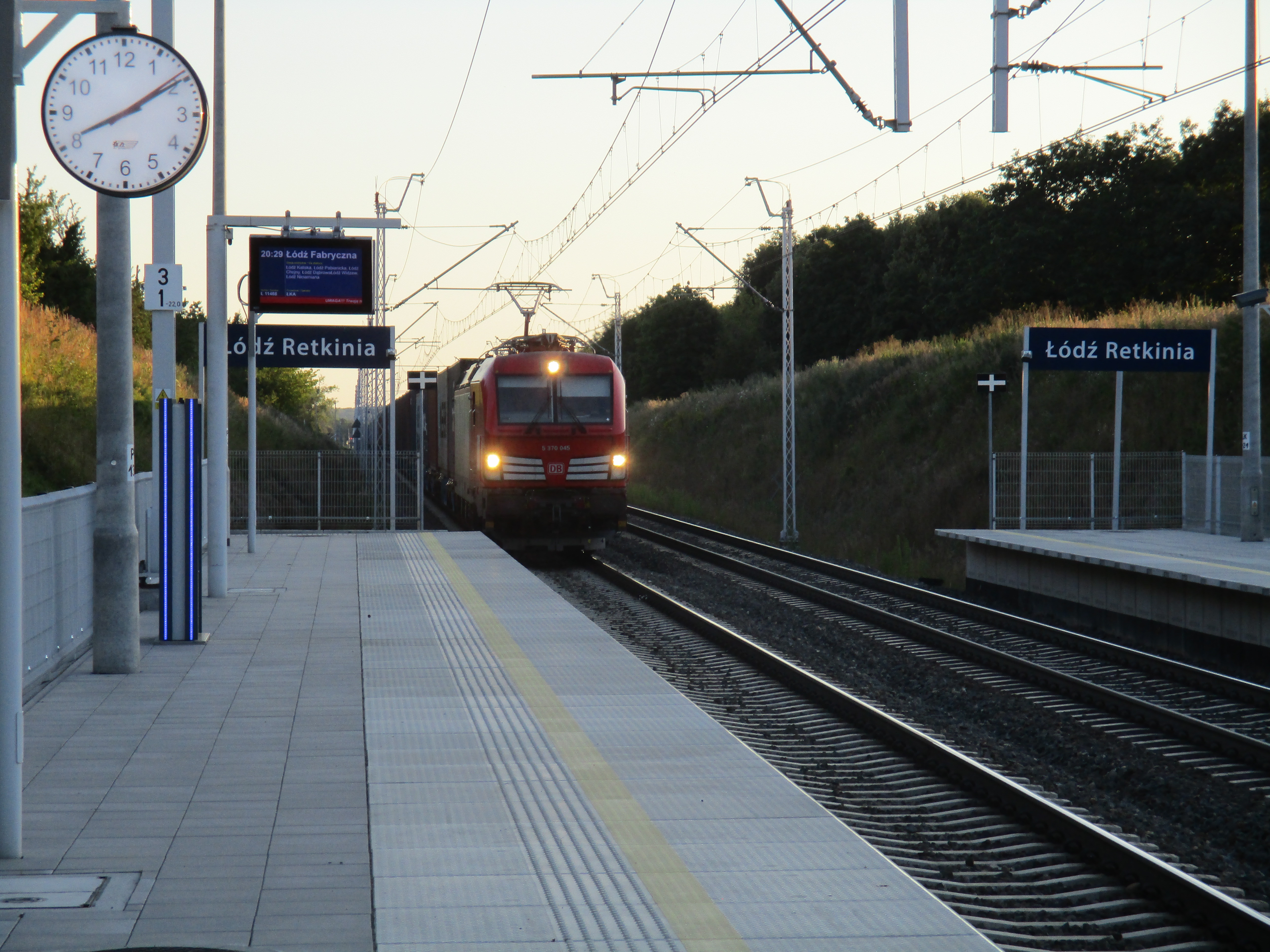
- Freight train passing through Łódź Retkinia station

General information
- Location: Łódź, Polesie district Poland
- System: Commuter station
- Line: 14 Łódź–Tuplice railway
- Distance: 2.87 kilometres (1.78 mi) from Łódź Kaliska station.
- Platforms: 2

History
- Opened: 13 June 2021

Services
Preceding station	PKP Intercity	Following station
Łódź Chojny towards Warszawa Wschodnia	IC	Pabianice towards Zgorzelec
Preceding station	Polregio	Following station
Łódź Lublinek towards Ostrów Wielkopolski or Poznań Główny	IR	Łódź Kaliska towards Warszawa Główna
Łódź Lublinek towards Ostrów Wielkopolski or Poznań Główny	PR	Łódź Kaliska Terminus
Preceding station	ŁKA	Following station
Łódź Kaliska towards Łódź Widzew	Łódź - Sieradz	Łódź Lublinek towards Sieradz
Łódź Kaliska towards Łódź Fabryczna	Łódź - Poznań (jointly operated with Greater Poland Railways)	Pabianice towards Poznań Główny
Preceding station	KW	Following station
Pabianice towards Poznań Główny	Poznań - Łódź (Co-operated with Łódzka Kolej Aglomeracyjna)	Łódź Kaliska Terminus
Location

Łódź Retkinia is a commuter railway station in the Polish city of Łódź, in Polesie district, on the outskirts of the Retkinia housing neighbourhood. The station is located on the Łódź-Tuplice railway between Łódź Kaliska and Łódź Lublinek stations.

The station was planned as a part of Phase Two of Łódź Metropolitan Railway project, along with Warszawska and Radogoszcz Wschód stations on the circle line. An agreement to conduct the design of the station was signed on 27 December 2018. Construction works began in June 2020, and were completed in March 2021. The station was put into service on 13 June 2021.

== Train services ==
The station is served by the following services:

- Intercity services (IC) Zgorzelec - Legnica - Wrocław - Ostrów Wielkopolski - Łódź - Warszawa
- InterRegio services (IR) Ostrów Wielkopolski — Łódź — Warszawa Główna
- InterRegio services (IR) Poznań Główny — Ostrów Wielkopolski — Łódź — Warszawa Główna
- Regiona services (PR) Łódź Kaliska — Ostrów Wielkopolski
- Regional services (PR) Łódź Kaliska — Ostrów Wielkopolski — Poznań Główny

== Gallery ==
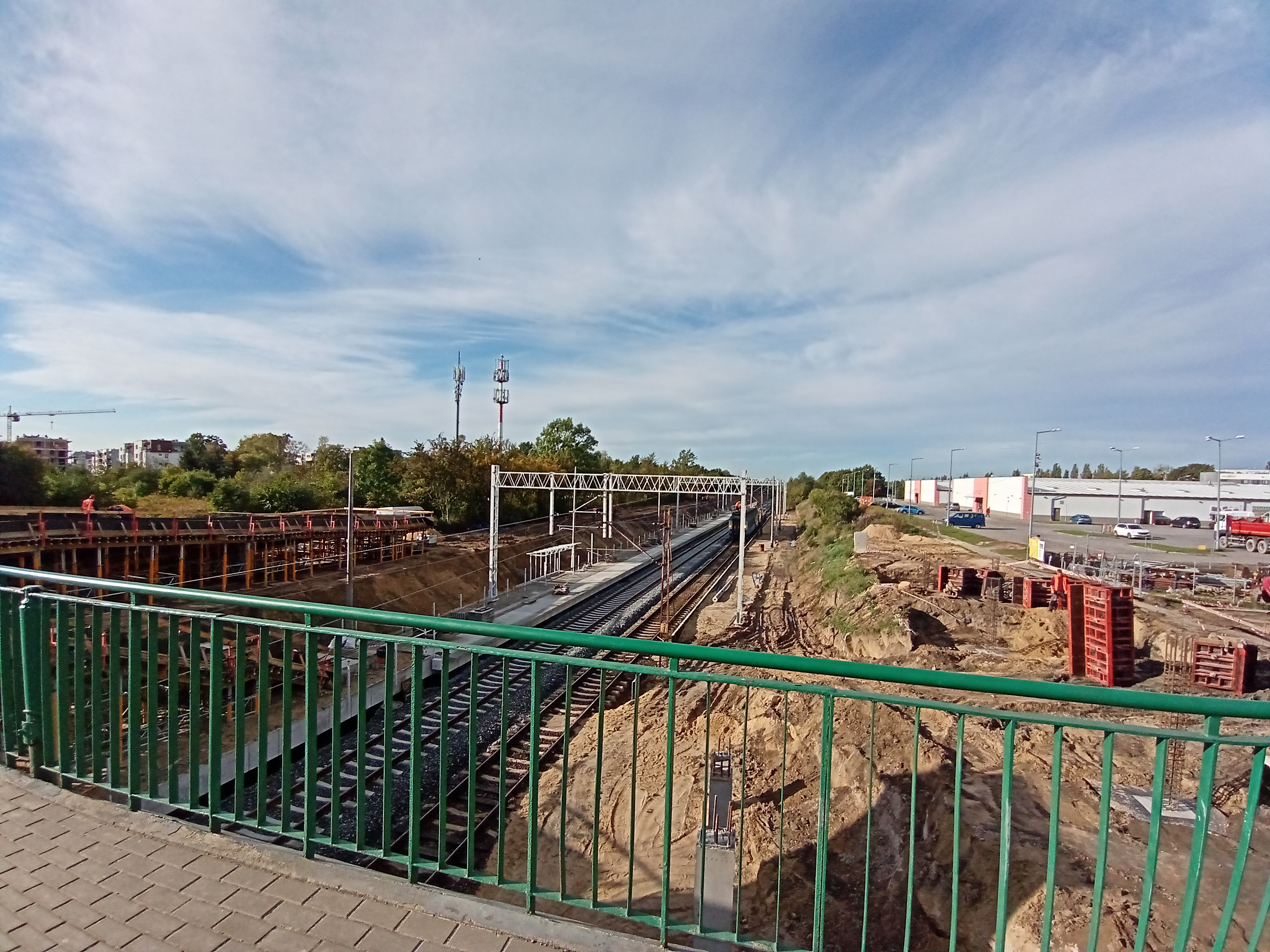
Construction site in October 2020 - westward

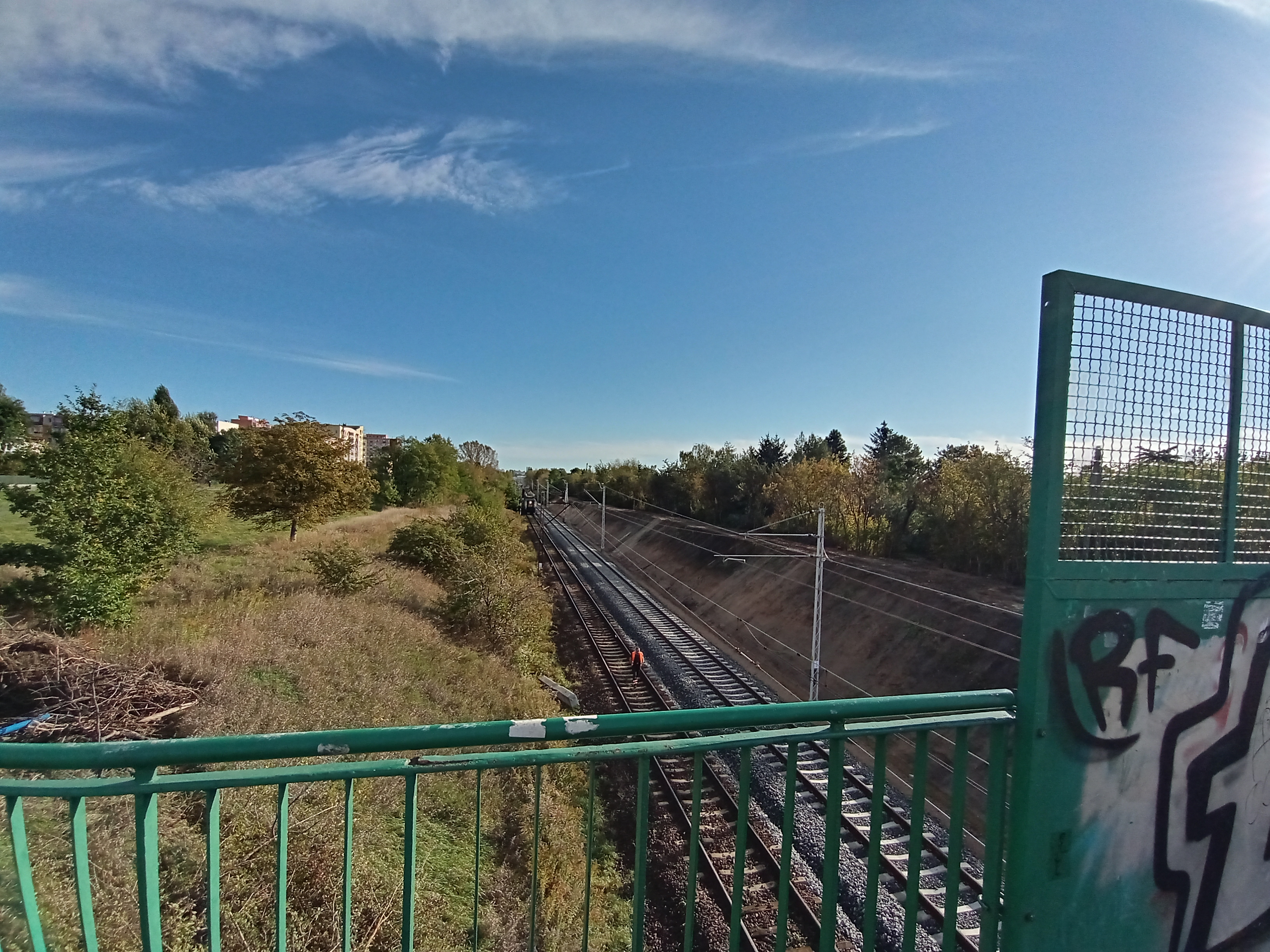
Construction site in October 2020 - eastward
