= Gmina Wierzchlas =

Gmina Wierzchlas Wierzchlas Commune
- Gmina
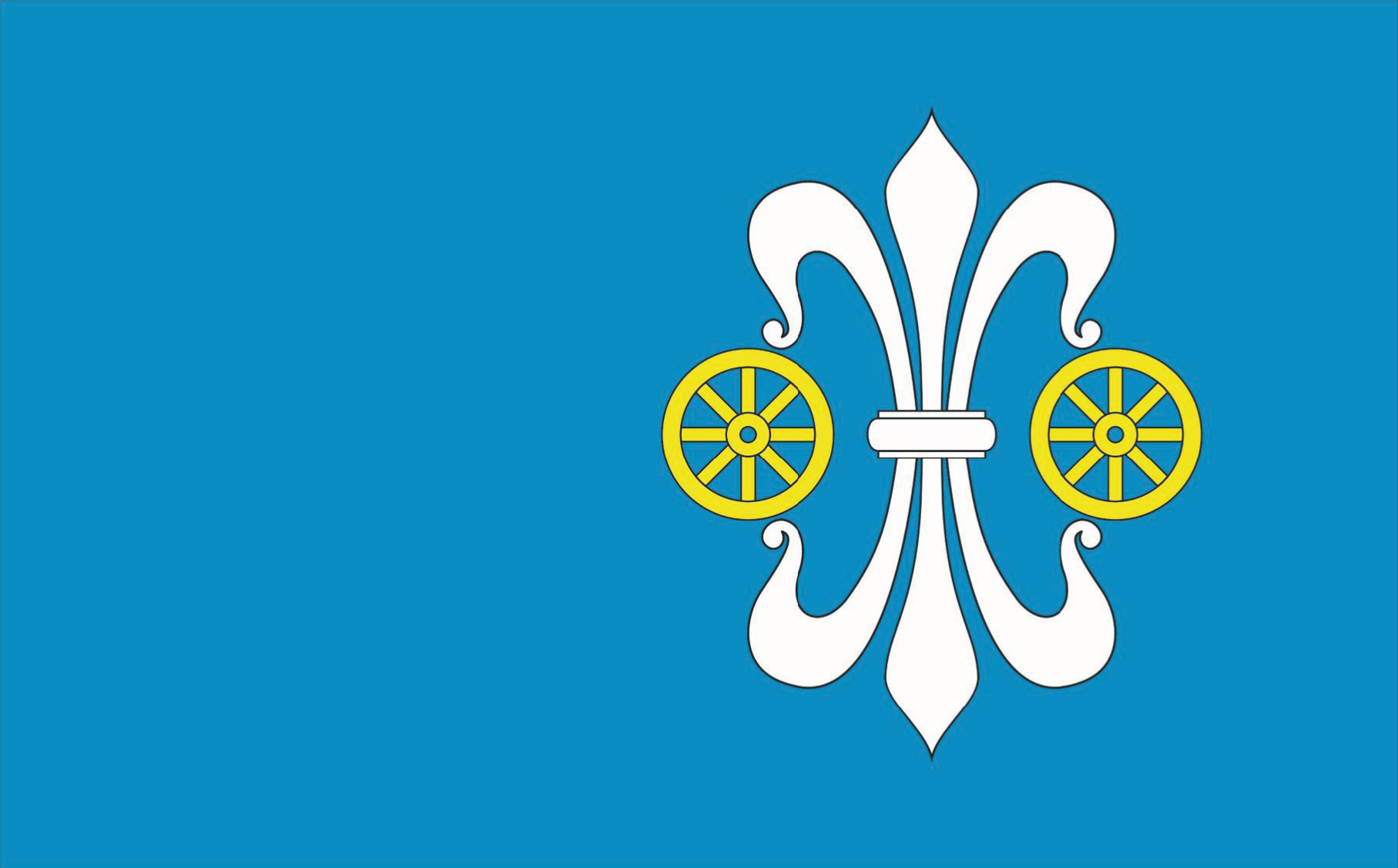
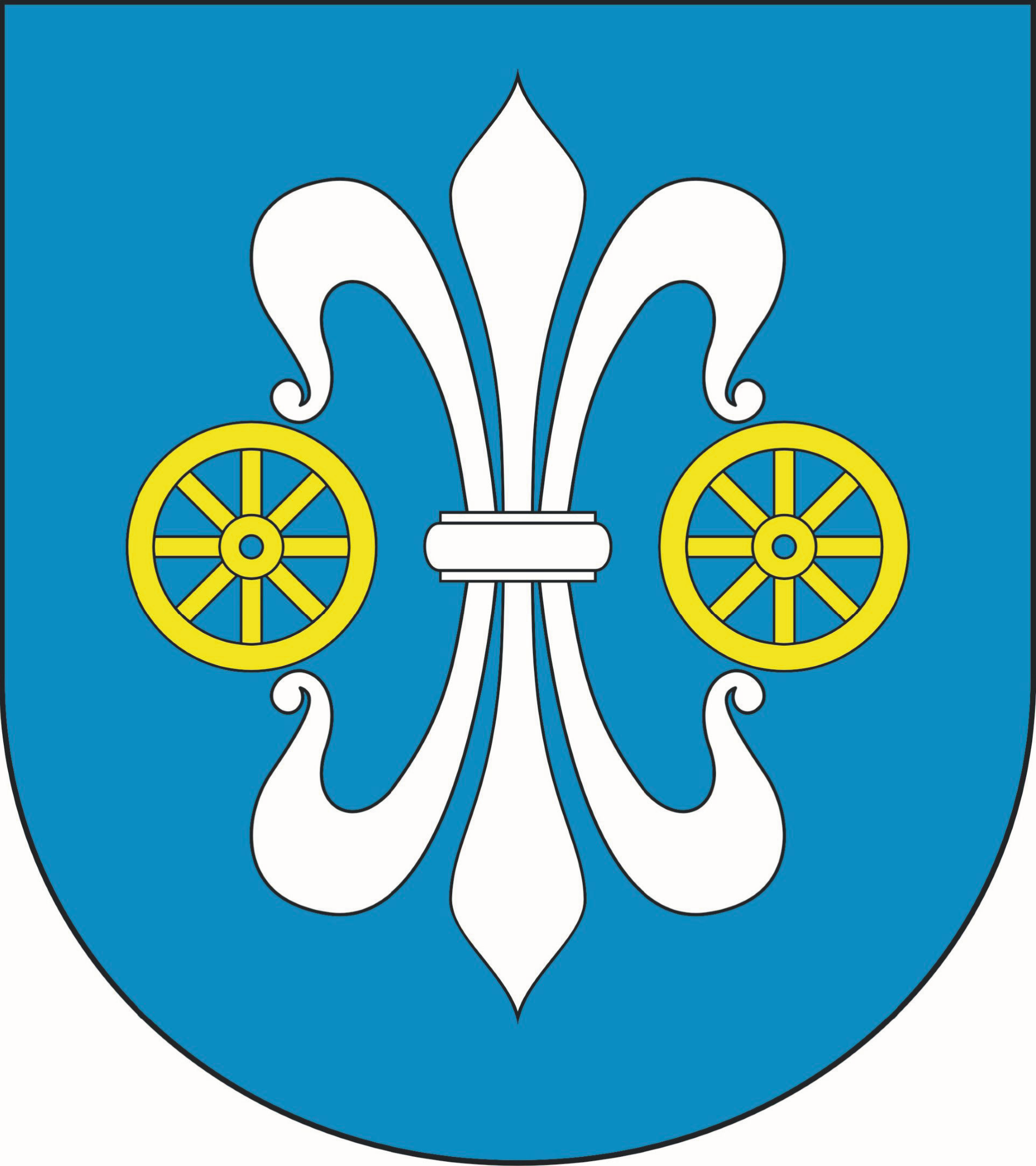
- Flag Coat of arms
- Interactive map of Gmina Wierzchlas
- Coordinates (Wierzchlas): 51°12′12″N 18°39′51″E
- Country: Poland
- Voivodeship: Łódź
- County: Wieluń
- Seat: Wierzchlas

Area
  - Total: 119.2 km^{2} (46.0 sq mi)

Population (2006)
  - Total: 6,651
  - Density: 55.80/km^{2} (144.5/sq mi)
- Website: http://www.wierzchlas.bazagmin.pl

Gmina Wierzchlas is a rural gmina (administrative district) in Wieluń County, Łódź Voivodeship, in central Poland. Its seat is the village of Wierzchlas, which lies approximately 7 kilometres (4 mi) east of Wieluń and 86 km (53 mi) south-west of the regional capital Łódź.

The gmina covers an area of 119.2 square kilometres (46.0 sq mi), and as of 2006 its total population is 6,651.

== Villages ==
Gmina Wierzchlas contains the villages and settlements of Broników, Jajczaki, Kamion, Kochlew, Kraszkowice, Krzeczów, Łaszew, Łaszew Rządowy, Mierzyce, Ogroble, Przycłapy, Przywóz, Strugi, Toporów and Wierzchlas.

== Neighbouring gminas ==
Gmina Wierzchlas is bordered by the gminas of Działoszyn, Osjaków, Pątnów, Siemkowice and Wieluń.
