= Jan Dobrzyński =

Polish politician

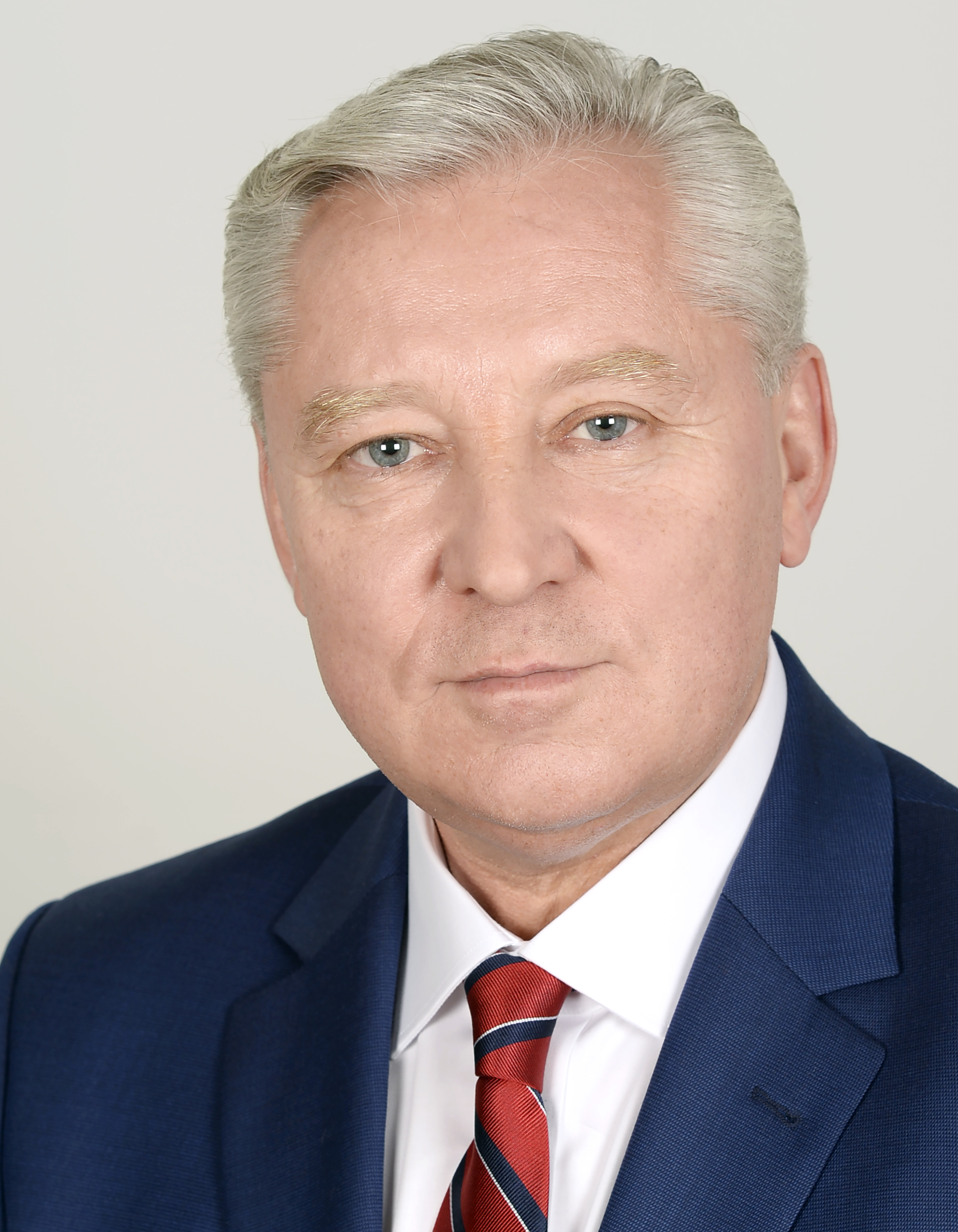

Voivode of Podlaskie Voivodeship
- In office January 2006 – January 2007
- President: Lech Kaczyński
- Prime Minister: Marek Belka; Kazimierz Marcinkiewicz
- Preceded by: Marek Strzaliński
- Succeeded by: Bohdan Paszkowski

Personal details
- Born: 24 September 1958 (age 68) Knyszyn, Polish People's Republic
- Citizenship: Poland
- Party: Law and Justice
- Other political affiliations: Centre Agreement
- Education: Higher School of Environmental Protection in Bydgoszcz
- Occupation: Engineer, politician

Jan Dobrzyński (born September 24, 1958, in Knyszyn) is a Polish politician, local government official and engineer, senator of the 7th and 9th terms and from January 2006 to January 2007 Voivode of Podlaskie Voivodeship.

== Biography ==
In 2004, he graduated from the Faculty of Environmental Protection of the Higher School of Environmental Protection in Bydgoszcz.

In the years 1976–1998 he worked in various plants in Białystok, then until 2002 he sat on the city board. He has been a member of "Solidarity" since 1980, and in the years 1993–1995 he was a member of its regional board. From 1990 he was a member of the Centre Agreement. In the years 1998–2006, he was a councilor of the city council. In 1998 elected from the Solidarity Electoral Action list, in 2002 from the Law and Justice list and he was the chairman of the PiS councilors' club, as well as the director of the parliamentary and senatorial office of Krzysztof Jurgiel from 2001 to 2006. From January 2006 to January 2007, he served as the Voivode of Podlaskie Voivodeship, and in 2007 he held the position of director of the Gas Plant in Białystok.

In the 2007 parliamentary elections, on behalf of Law and Justice, he was elected senator of the 7th term in the Białystok district, receiving 148,917 votes. In 2011, he unsuccessfully ran for re-election. In 2014, he became the candidate of Law and Justice in the 2014 local elections for the office of the mayor of Białystok, losing in the second round of voting to Tadeusz Truskolaski. However, he obtained a mandate as a councillor of the Podlaskie Voivodeship Sejmik of the 5th term.

In 2015, he ran for the Senate again on behalf of PiS in district no. 60. He was elected senator of the 9th term, receiving 92,252 votes. On April 11, 2018, he was suspended as a PiS member, after which he left the PiS club and became an unaffiliated senator. In the 2019 elections, he decided to run for re-election on behalf of the United Right Voters' Electoral Committee, which he founded, for which he was excluded from Law and Justice in September of that year (he did not win re-election to the Senate at that time).
