= Krystyna Łukaszuk =

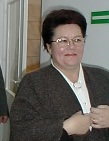

Voivode of Podlaskie Voivodeship
- In office 1 January 1999 – October 2001
- President: Aleksander Kwaśniewski
- Prime Minister: Józef Oleksy; Włodzimierz Cimoszewicz
- Succeeded by: Marek Strzaliński

Voivode of Białystok Voivodeship
- In office 1997 – 31 December 1998
- President: Aleksander Kwaśniewski
- Prime Minister: Józef Oleksy; Włodzimierz Cimoszewicz
- Preceded by: Andrzej Gajewski
- Succeeded by: herself

Personal details
- Born: 25 April 1949 (age 76) Białystok, Polish People's Republic
- Citizenship: Poland
- Party: Solidarity Electoral Action
- Occupation: Railway worker, politician

Krystyna Łukaszuk (born April 25, 1949, in Białystok) is a Polish trade union activist, state official, Voivode of Białystok Voivodeship in 1997–1998 and then, following the 1999 administrative reform, as Voivode of Podlaskie Voivodeship from 1999 to 2001.

== Biography ==
She attended the Construction and Surveying School Complex in Białystok. She completed higher education in construction engineering. She worked for the Polish State Railways, and in the early 1980s she became involved in the activities of NSZZ "Solidarność" organization at PKP. From 1992 to 1993, she was deputy director of the department at the voivodeship office and then she was employed in the regional management of "Solidarity" organization.

In 1997, on the recommendation of NSZZ "S" and Solidarity Electoral Action, she became the Voivode of Białystok. After the administrative reform, on January 1, 1999, she became the Voivode of Podlaskie Voivodeship, an office she held until autumn 2001, when she was replaced by Marek Strzaliński.

She later became a trainer of the Regional Center of the European Social Fund in Białystok.

In 2020, she was awarded the Cross of Freedom and Solidarity.
