= Stanisław Prutis =

Polish jurist, professor of law

Voivode of Białystok Voivodeship
- In office 1990–1994
- President: Lech Wałęsa
- Prime Minister: Tadeusz Mazowiecki
- Preceded by: Marian Gała
- Succeeded by: Andrzej Gajewski

Personal details
- Born: 15 March 1948 (age 78) Kraskowo, Polish People's Republic
- Citizenship: Poland
- Party: Solidarity Citizens' Committee
- Education: University of Wrocław
- Occupation: Jurist, politician, academician

Stanisław Prutis (born 15 March 1948, in Kraskowo) is a Polish jurist, professor of law, Voivode of Białystok Voivodeship (1990–1994), dean of the Faculty of Law of the University of Białystok (1996–2005), full professor at the University of Białystok.

== Biography ==
He was born in Kraskowo, Warmian–Masurian Voivodeship. In 1965, he passed his high school final exams at the Wojciech Kętrzyński Secondary School in Kętrzyn. Then, in 1969, he graduated from law studies at the University of Wrocław. He defended his doctorate and in 1988 obtained a habilitation degree. In 1999, he received the title of professor of law. He specializes in agricultural and civil law. He was a researcher at the University of Public Administration in Białystok and at the Department of Civil Law at the University of Białystok (as a full professor).

In 1980, he became involved in opposition activities, joining "Solidarity" movement. He served as a legal advisor, co-authored the regional statute of the association and participated in the 1st National Congress of Delegates in Gdańsk. During 1981–1983 Martial law, he was interned for almost three months. He participated in the work of the Solidarity Center for Civic Legislative Initiatives.

From 1990 to 1994 he held the position of Voivode of Białystok Voivodeship. He later withdrew from political activity. He served, among others, as Dean of the Faculty of Law of the University of Białystok (1996–2005), head of the Department of Civil Law at this university. He also served as a judge of the Supreme Administrative Court at the Provincial Administrative Court in Białystok for 20 years, after which he retired. He also cooperated with the Institute of Public Affairs.

He was awarded, among others, Knight's Cross (1999) and Officer's Cross (2011) of the Order of Polonia Restituta, Medal of Merit for the Administration of Justice – Bene Merentibus Iustitiae (2013), Cross of Freedom and Solidarity (2015) and the Badge of Honor for Merits for Local Government (2015).

== Selected works ==
- Prutis, Stanisław (2018-11-23). Instytucje podstawowe prawa prywatnego: w opozycji do regulacji prawa publicznego (in Polish). Wydawnictwo Temida 2. ISBN 978-83-65696-05-2
- Prutis, Stanisław (1997). Gospodarowanie nieruchomościami rolnymi Skarbu Państwa. Komentarz i orzecznictwo SN i NSA (in Polish). Temida 2. ISBN 978-83-86137-36-7
- Prutis, Stanisław (1987). Pozycja prawna państwowych przedsiębiorstw gospodarki rolnej: ewolucja rozwiązań (in Polish). Dział Wydawnictw Filii UW w Białymstoku.
- Prawo rolne. Przepisy i orzecznictwo (red.), 1998.
- Zespoły rolników indywidualnych (problemy organizacyjno-prawne), 1980.
- Grunty rolne. Problemy prawno-organizacyjne (współautor), 1985.
- Polskie prawo rolne u progu Unii Europejskiej (red.), 1998.
