= Kochlew =

- Village
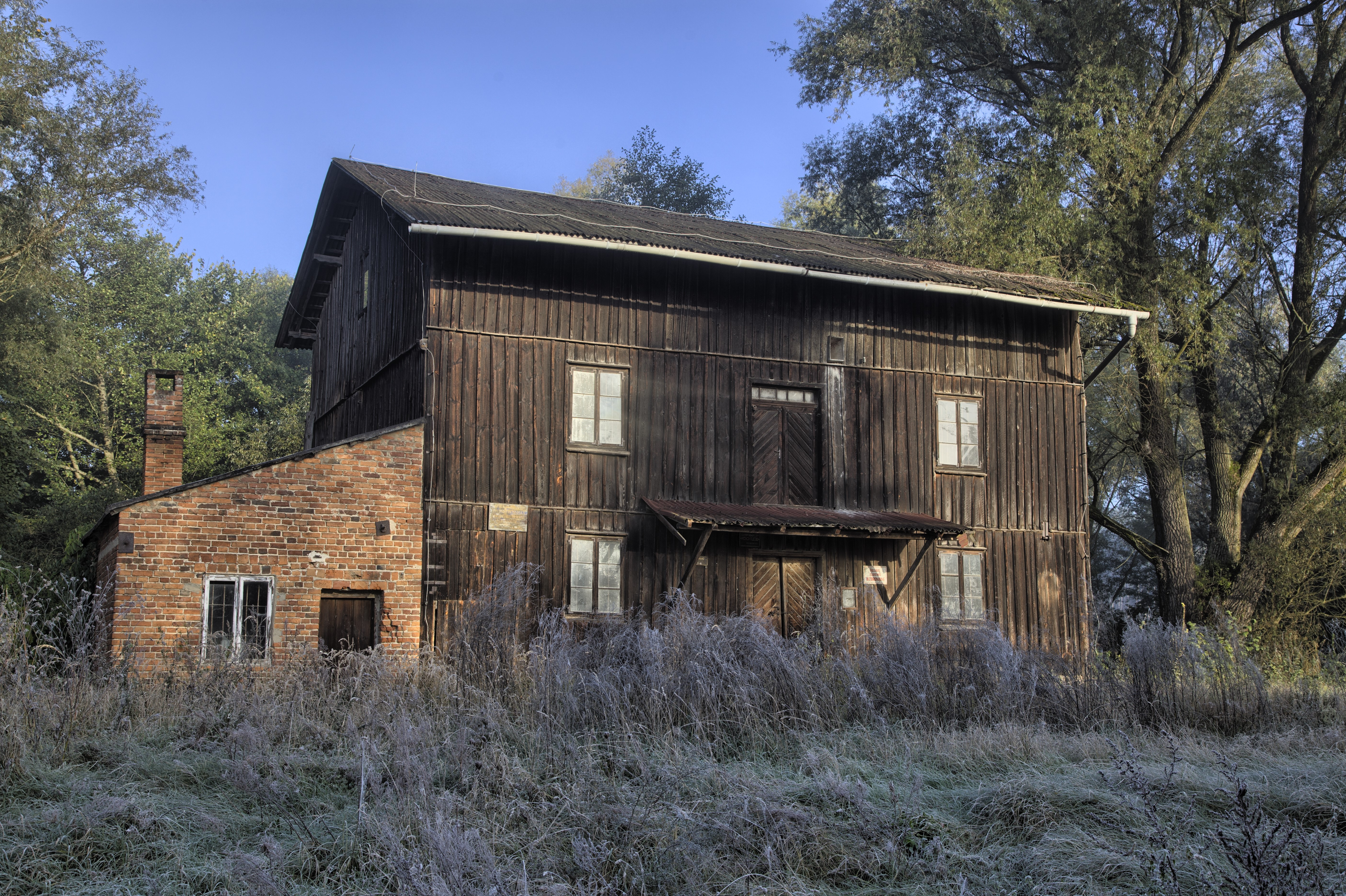
- Watermill in the village

- Location within Poland
- Coordinates: 51°11′50″N 18°46′17″E
- Country: Poland
- Voivodeship: Łódź
- County: Wieluń
- Gmina: Wierzchlas

Kochlew [ˈkɔxlɛf] is a village in the administrative district of Gmina Wierzchlas, within Wieluń County, Łódź Voivodeship, in central Poland.
