= Toporów, Łódź Voivodeship =

Toporów
- Village
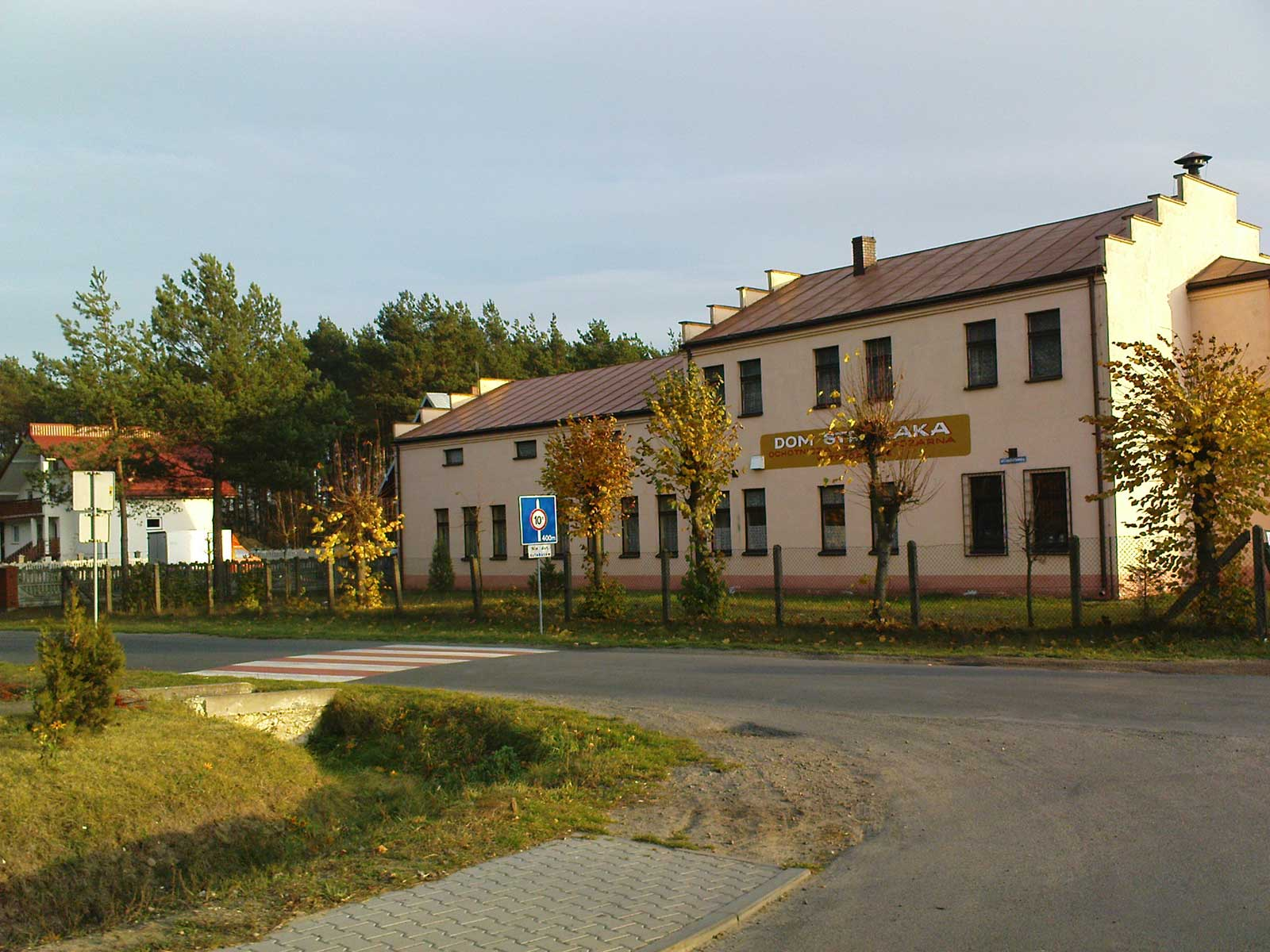
- Fire department

- Location within Poland
- Coordinates: 51°9′14″N 18°44′6″E
- Country: Poland
- Voivodeship: Łódź
- County: Wieluń
- Gmina: Wierzchlas

Population
  - Total: 520
- Time zone: UTC+1 (CET)
  - Summer (DST): UTC+2 (CEST)
- Vehicle registration: EWI

Toporów [tɔˈpɔruf] is a village in the administrative district of Gmina Wierzchlas, within Wieluń County, Łódź Voivodeship, in south-central Poland.

== History ==
Town rights were granted in 1490 and revoked before 1673. It was a private town, administratively located in the Wieluń County in the Sieradz Voivodeship in the Greater Poland Province of the Kingdom of Poland.
