= Wierzchlas, Łódź Voivodeship =

Wierzchlas
- Village
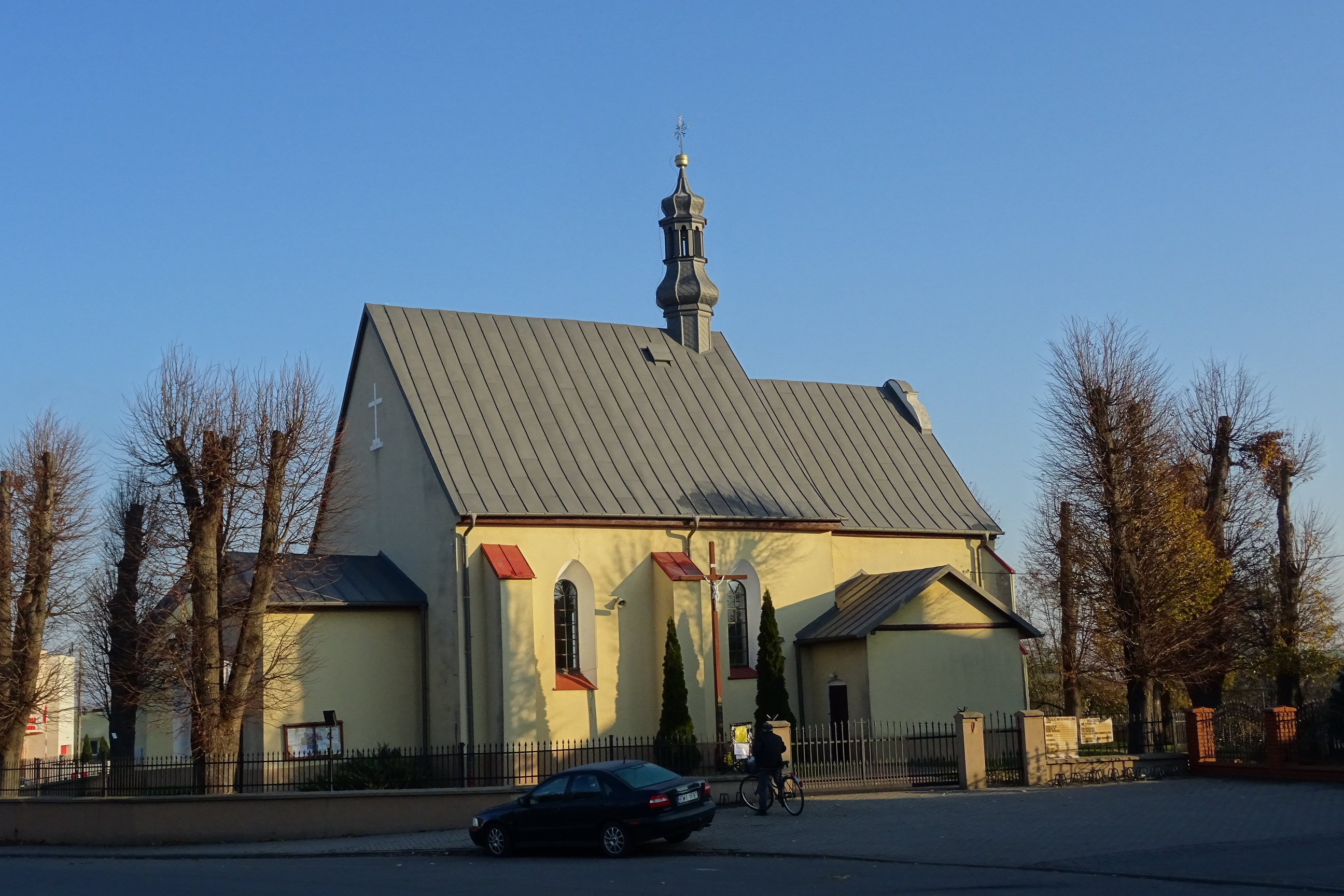
- Church of Saint Nicholas

- Location within Poland
- Coordinates: 51°12′12″N 18°39′51″E
- Country: Poland
- Voivodeship: Łódź
- County: Wieluń
- Gmina: Wierzchlas

Population
  - Total: 2,000

Wierzchlas [ˈvjɛʂxlas] is a village in Wieluń County, Łódź Voivodeship, in central Poland. It is the seat of the gmina (administrative district) called Gmina Wierzchlas.
