= Marek Strzaliński =

Polish politician (born 1947)

Member of Sejm 2005-2007
- In office 18 October 2005 – 4 November 2007

Voivode of Podlaskie Voivodeship
- In office October 2001 – October 2005
- Preceded by: Krystyna Łukaszuk
- Succeeded by: Jan Dobrzyński

Personal details
- Born: 7 October 1947 (age 78) Siedlce
- Party: Democratic Left Alliance
- Education: Agricultural Academy in Lublin

Marek Strzaliński (born 7 October 1947 in Siedlce) is a Polish Politician. He was elected to the Sejm on 25 September 2005, getting 11,045 votes in Białystok electoral district as a candidate from the Democratic Left Alliance list.

== See also ==
- Members of Polish Sejm 2005-2007
