= Przywóz =

- Village
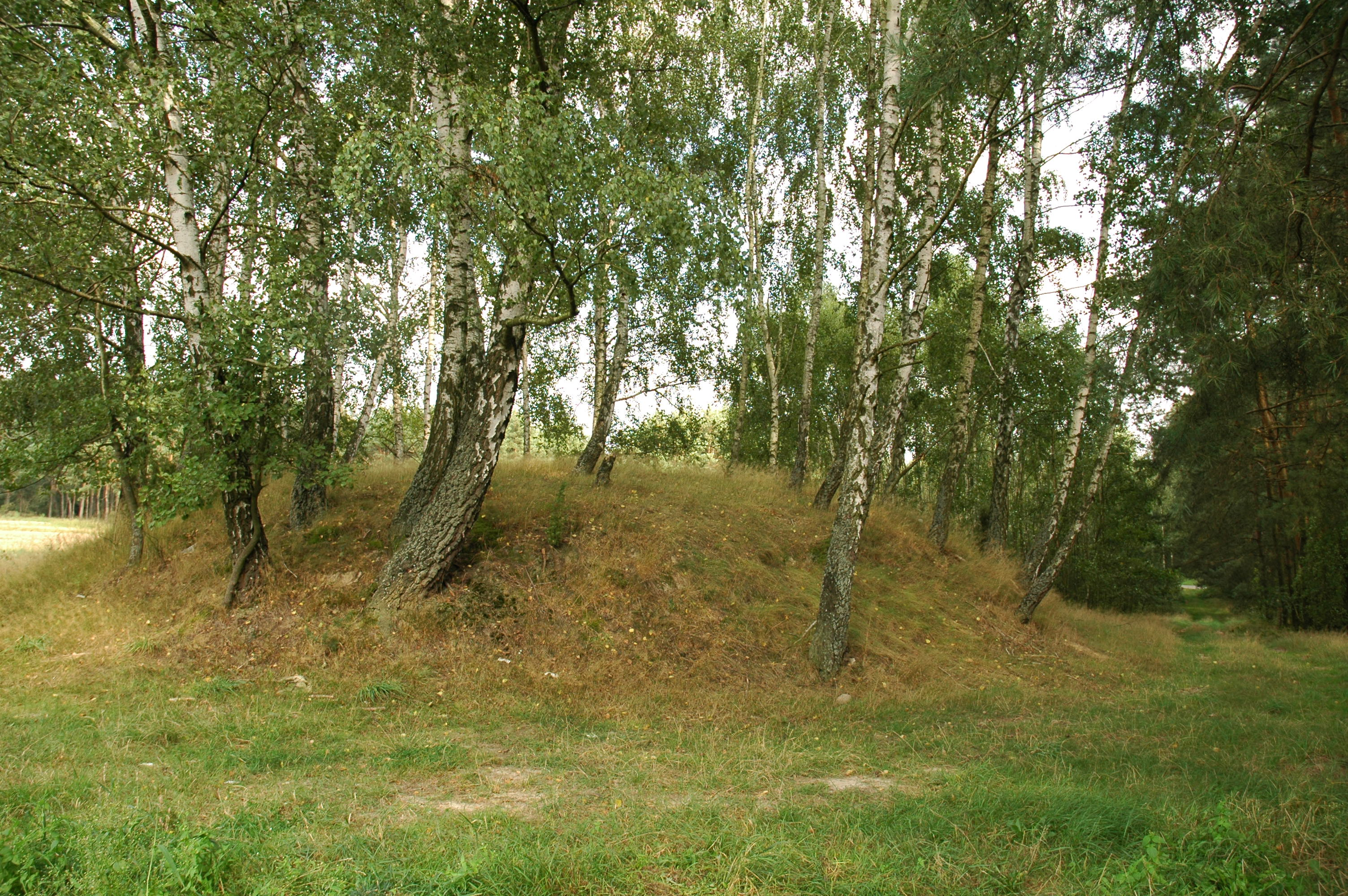
- Ducal Kurgan II in Przywóz

- Location within Poland
- Coordinates: 51°9′N 18°43′E
- Country: Poland
- Voivodeship: Łódź
- County: Wieluń
- Gmina: Wierzchlas
- Time zone: UTC+1 (CET)
  - Summer (DST): UTC+2 (CEST)
- Vehicle registration: EWI

Przywóz [ˈpʂɨvus] is a village in the administrative district of Gmina Wierzchlas, within Wieluń County, Łódź Voivodeship, in south-central Poland.

== History ==
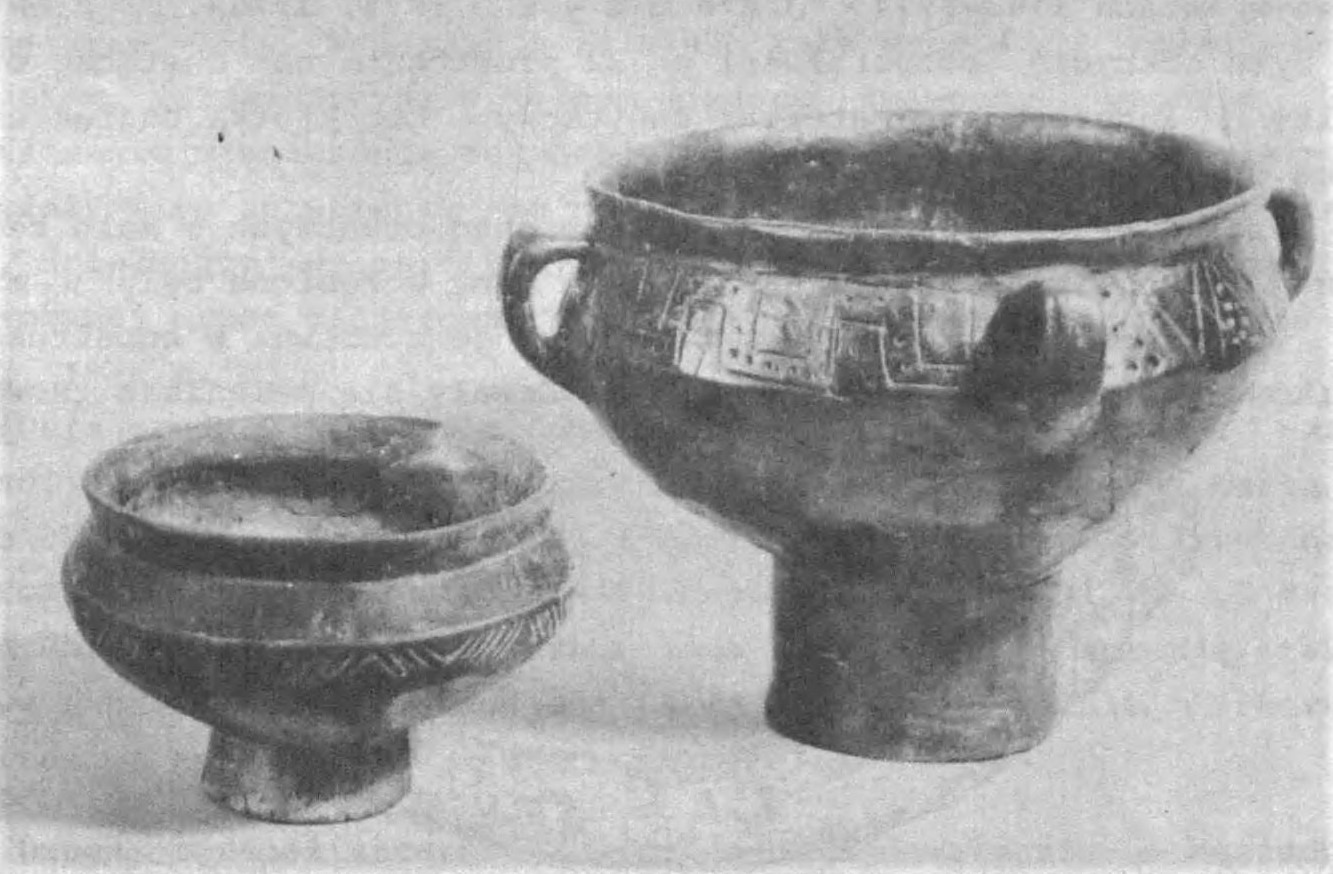
Cinerary urn and vessel from the Ducal Kurgans

In the village there are two prehistoric tumuli and a settlement of the Przeworsk culture, dating back to the 2nd century AD, now an archaeological site. Named the "Ducal Kurgans", they are linked to a local section of the ancient Amber Road connecting the Baltic Sea with the Roman Empire.

In the 16th century, the inhabitants of Przywóz were minor nobility. In the late 19th century, Przywóz had a population of 187.

During the German occupation of Poland (World War II), in 1940, the German gendarmerie carried out expulsions of Poles, who were placed in a transit camp in Łódź, and then young Poles were deported to forced labour in Germany and German-occupied France, and others were deported to the General Government in the more eastern part of German-occupied Poland. Houses and farms of expelled Poles were handed over to German colonists as part of the Lebensraum policy.

In 1964–1974, a team of archaeologists led by professor Konrad Jażdżewski of the Museum of Archaeology and Ethnography in Łódź conducted archaeological research on the tumuli in Przywóz.
