= Kamion, Łódź Voivodeship =

Kamion
- Village
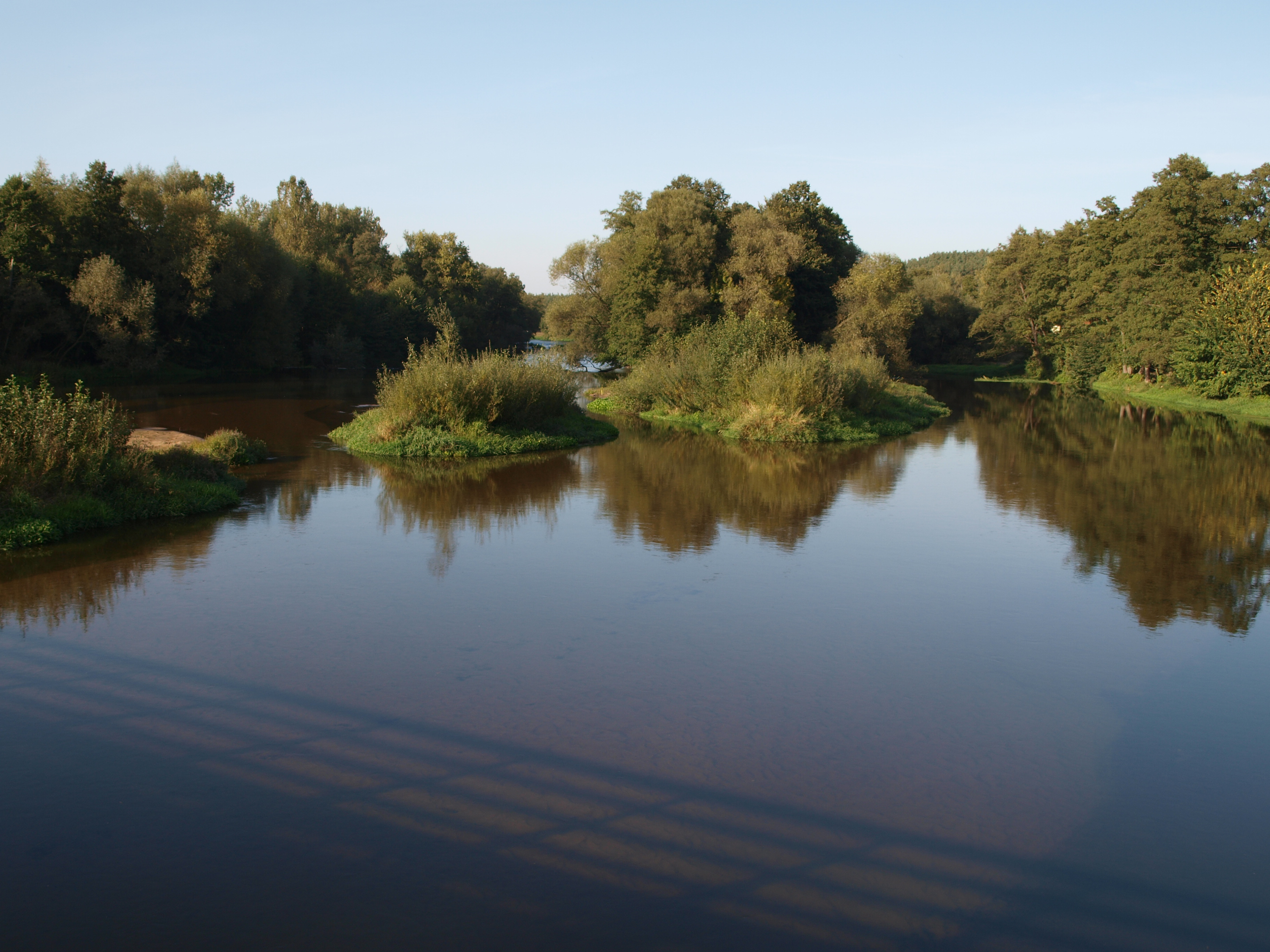
- Warta River in Kamion

- Location within Poland
- Coordinates: 51°9′12″N 18°44′38″E
- Country: Poland
- Voivodeship: Łódź
- County: Wieluń
- Gmina: Wierzchlas
- Time zone: UTC+1 (CET)
  - Summer (DST): UTC+2 (CEST)
- Vehicle registration: EWI

Kamion [ˈkamjɔn] is a village in the administrative district of Gmina Wierzchlas, within Wieluń County, Łódź Voivodeship, in south-central Poland.

== History ==
Kamion was royal town of the Kingdom of Poland, administratively located in the Wieluń County in the Sieradz Voivodeship in the Greater Poland Province.

During the German occupation of Poland (World War II), in 1940, the German gendarmerie carried out expulsions of Poles, who were placed in a transit camp in Łódź, and then young Poles were deported to forced labour in Germany and German-occupied France, and others were deported to the General Government in the more eastern part of German-occupied Poland. Houses and farms of expelled Poles were handed over to German colonists as part of the Lebensraum policy.
