= Przycłapy =

- Village
- Location within Poland
- Coordinates: 51°11′N 18°39′E
- Country: Poland
- Voivodeship: Łódź
- County: Wieluń
- Gmina: Wierzchlas

Przycłapy [pʂɨt͡sˈwapɨ] is a village in the administrative district of Gmina Wierzchlas, within Wieluń County, Łódź Voivodeship, in central Poland.
