= Ogroble =

- Village
- Location within Poland
- Coordinates: 51°8′N 18°45′E
- Country: Poland
- Voivodeship: Łódź
- County: Wieluń
- Gmina: Wierzchlas

Ogroble [ɔˈɡrɔblɛ] is a village in the administrative district of Gmina Wierzchlas, within Wieluń County, Łódź Voivodeship, in central Poland.
