= Retkinia =

Panel block housing estate and district in Łódź, Poland

Coordinates: 51°44′46.47″N 19°23′53.08″E

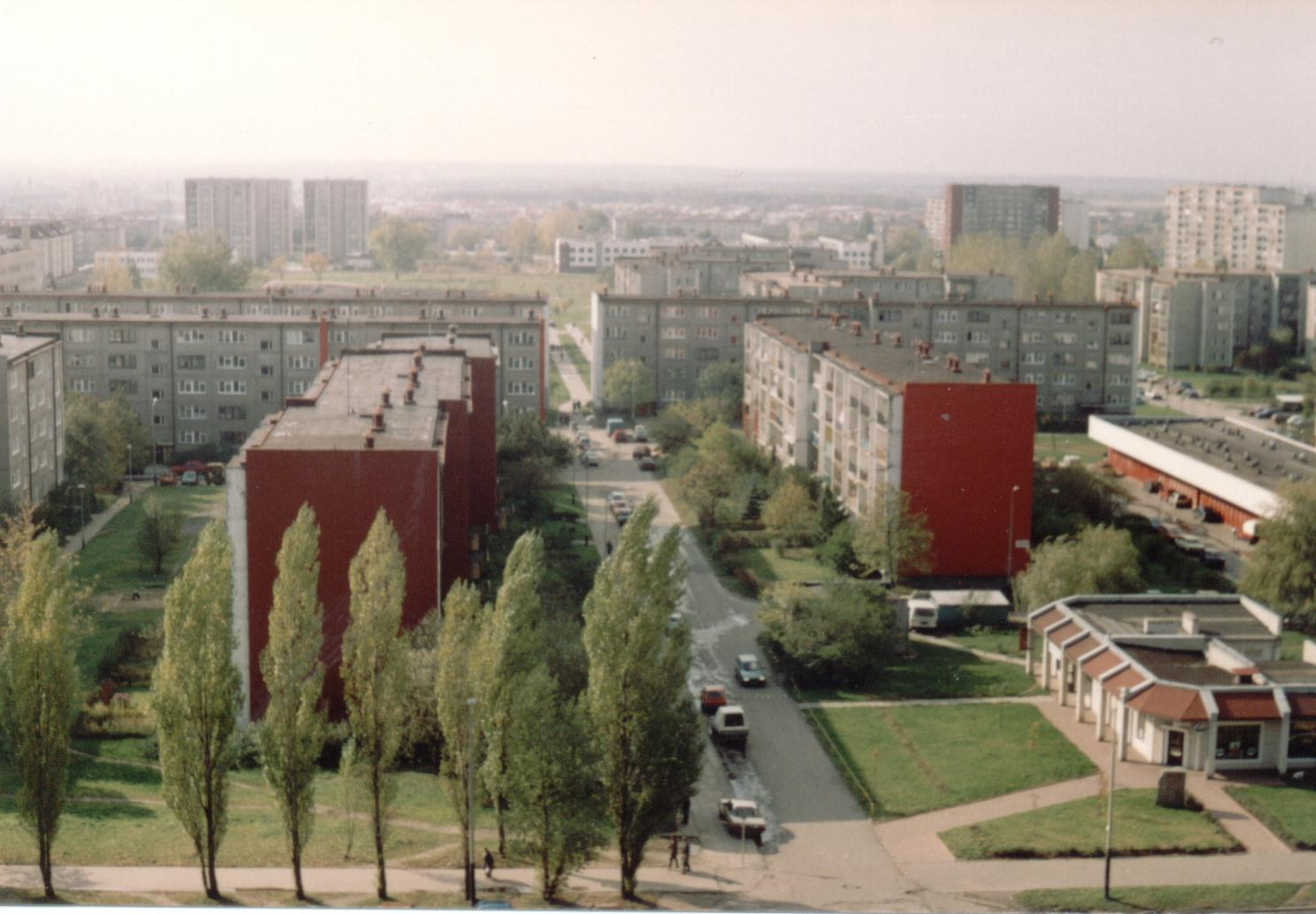
Retkinia, Armii Krajowej Street

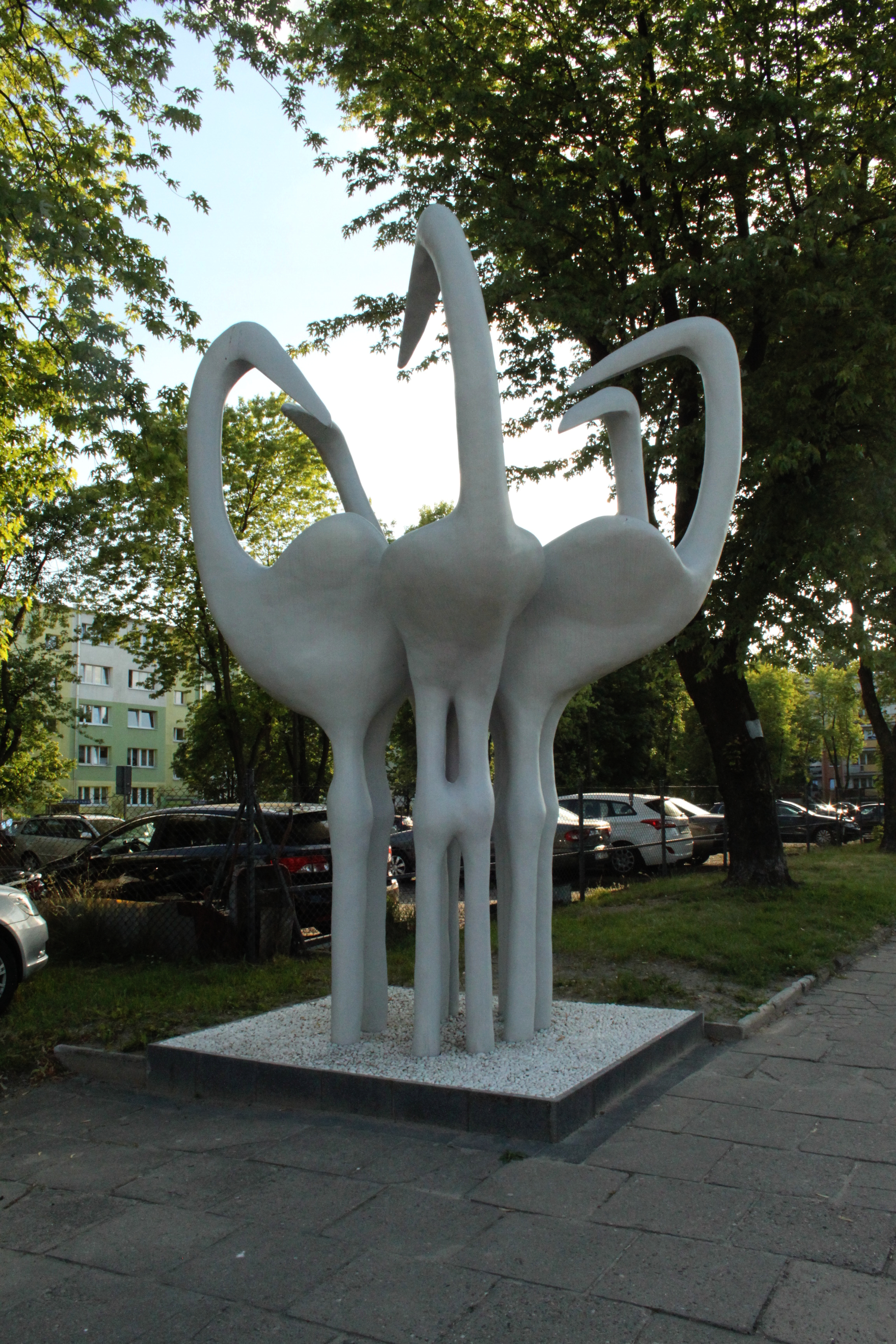
The Storks - a sculpture that has become a symbol of the district

Retkinia is a panel block housing estate and district in the city of Łódź (Poland), located in the south-western part of the city. Formerly a suburban village, Retkinia was incorporated into Łódź in 1946. According to information provided by Łódź city council, the district has a population of around 60,000 people. Retkinia is one of 56 districts recognized by the Urban Information System in Łódź, but in terms of municipal administration it is divided into Osiedle Karolew-Retkinia Wschód (Eastern Retkinia, including the district of Karolew) and Osiedle Retkinia Zachód-Smulsko (Western Retkinia, including the district of Smulsko). The dominant type of housing in Retkinia is Panelák, built from the year 1972 on.

== Name ==
The origin and meaning of the name Retkinia is uncertain. It has been suggested that the name originates from ret kiń, an expression glossed as "cast the net." This could either refer to the act of throwing fishing nets (which would suggest that the area was rich in fish) or to casting away hunting nets and settling down, which would account for the origin of farming in the area. Neither "ret" nor "kiń" are in use in contemporary Polish, and the etymology is a matter of guesswork. Another theory suggests that the name of the district derives from the personal name Retko (or Retka).

== History ==
The earliest archeological records in Retkinia date back to c. 800-250 B.C.E and are representative of Lusatian culture. A major discovery in Retkinia was the excavation of a rich skeletal grave of a woman from the 3rd century C.E. in 1935.

=== 1398–1910 ===
Before being incorporated into the city of Łódź in 1946, Retkinia was for many centuries closely associated with the nearby town of Pabianice rather than the fledgling town of Łódź. First mentioned in an ecclesiastical document in 1398, the village was administratively part of the Roman Catholic parish of St. Matthew in Pabianice from the late Middle Ages until 1910, and together with Pabianice it belonged to the Cathedral Chapter of Kraków until the Prussian invasion of 1793. After negotiations between the Chapter and the Prussian government following the second partition of Poland, the Chapter was compensated for the loss of lands, which became a property of the Prussian state, later to be incorporated into the Duchy of Warsaw (1807-1815) during the Napoleonic Wars. After the Congress of Vienna, Retkinia, alongside Łódź and Pabianice, became part of the newly created Congress Poland, a client state of the Russian Empire. In 1839 the State Treasury sold the forest in Retkinia to brothers Konstanty and Jan Sięmiątkowski, and in 1841 the village was transferred into the ownership of Mateusz Lubowidzki, a member of the Council of State of the Kingdom of Poland. The latter sold the village to Wilhelm Nencki in 1854, whose family was compensated by the state following the abolition of serfdom in Congress Poland in 1864. Nencki tried to force the local peasants back into serfdom in 1864 but met with resistance and failed. In 1851 the eastern part of the village (later known as Zagrodniki) was struck by a devastating fire, and in 1855 the area experienced a famine caused by protracted rains. Poor sanitation and poverty contributed to disease, including two outbreaks of cholera. The year 1875 saw a reparceling of land, which led to the creation of six areas of settlement (Długa Kolonia, Mała Kolonia, Działy, Brzózki, Piaski and Zagrodniki) that were to form the structure of Retkinia until the construction of the housing estate in the 1970s. According to official statistics from 1827, the village of Retkinia (then located in Kalisz Voivodeship, Sieradz obwód, Szadek county) had 33 houses and a population of 300. By 1881, Retkinia had 50 houses and a population of 560. In 1902 the Warsaw-Kalisz railway line was opened, its tracks cutting the village in two.

==== Folk culture ====
Information about folk culture in Retkinia comes from a historical survey written by the local priest Paweł Załuska and his brother Leonard. Writing in 1914, four years after the establishment of the local parish, they point to a high degree of superstition among the local population in the 19th century, possibly a result of the distance between the village of Retkinia and the parish church in Pabianice, which contributed to low levels of participation in religious services. Among local customs Załuska and Załuska mention throwing peas into the air at Christmas Eve dinner as a form of apotropaic magic directed against witchcraft, wrapping straw from the Christmas table around orchard trees to secure a good harvest, and dashing home from the church in carts to make the horses sweat, which was supposed to save them from sweating during labour in the fields. Local celebrations of Dyngus were particularly unrestrained, with incidents of young girls being thrown into troughs and poured with water sometimes leading to death of exposure. The village had its own cunning man named Jan Chrzciciel Szer, a settler from Rheinland, who practised folk-medicine with the help of herbal remedies as well as charms and prayers.

=== 1910–1946 ===
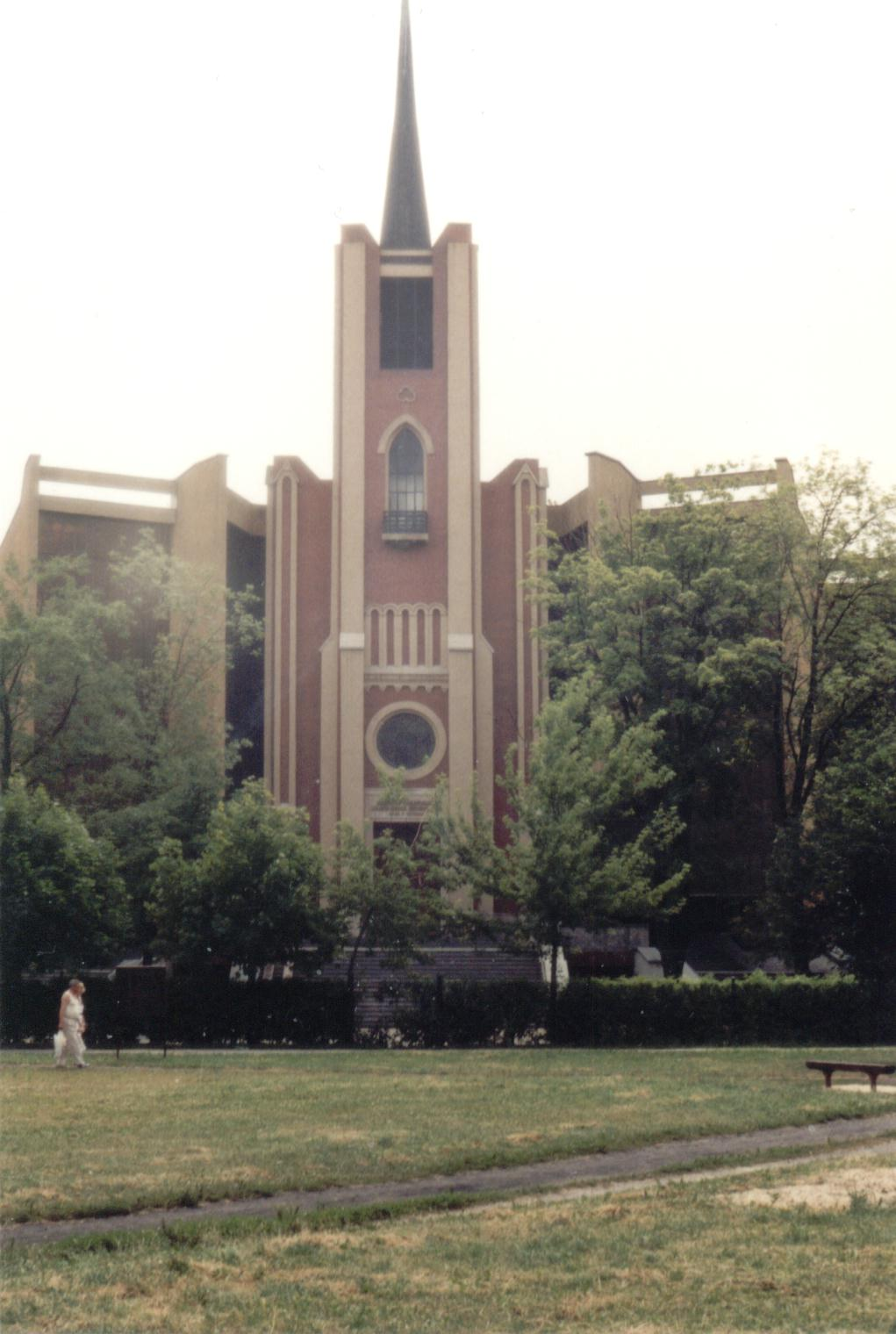
Sacred Heart of Jesus Church - constructed in the Neogothic style in 1910, rebuilt 1978-1982

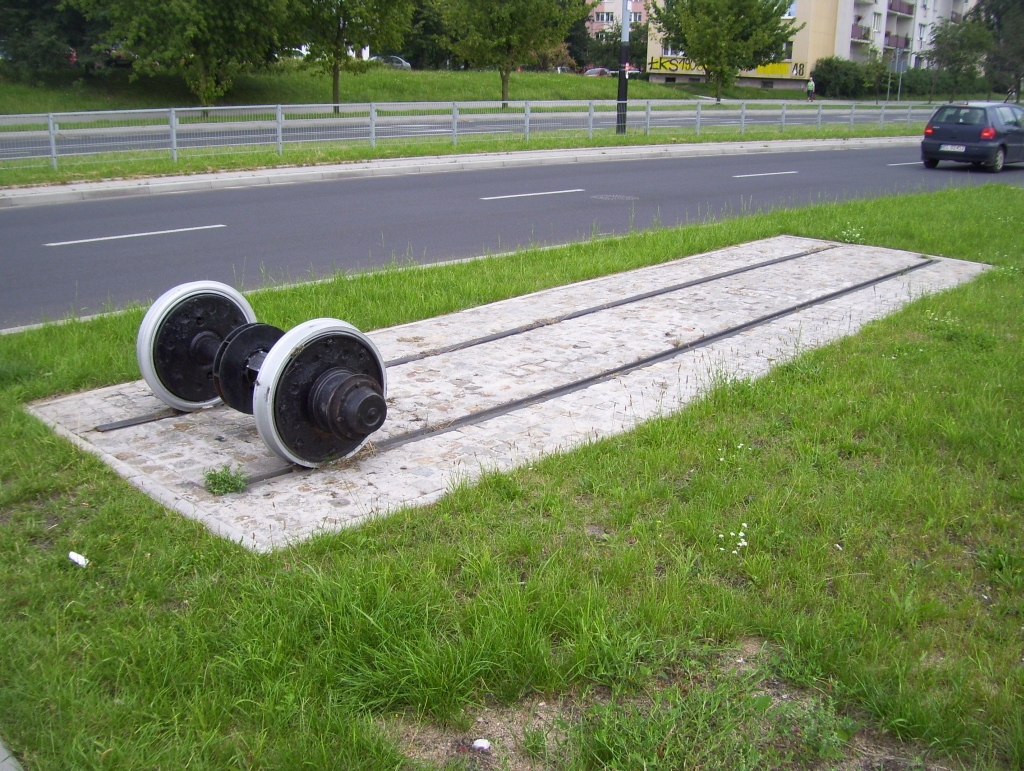
Retkinia Tram Route Monument (2006)

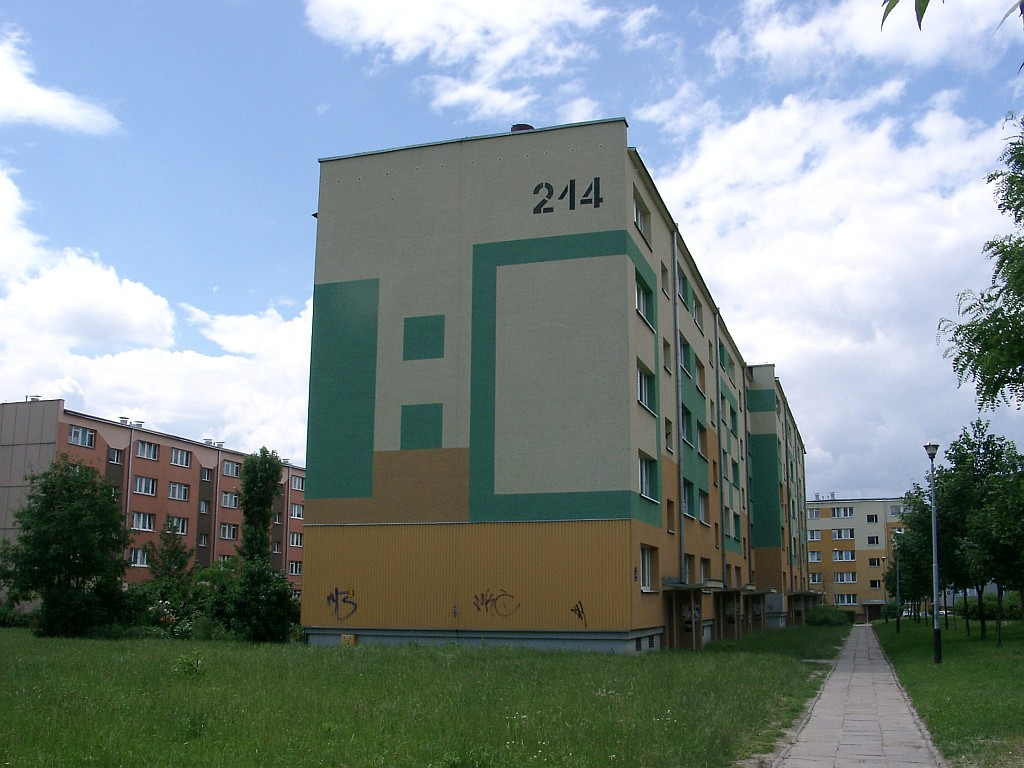
Block 214 - damaged in the 1983 gas explosion

A Catholic parish was established in Retkinia in 1910, and after three years of construction work (on 17 August 1913), the new church, built in the Neogothic style, was consecrated. The village cemetery, surviving to this day, was also established in 1910. In 1914 Retkinia had a population of 1576, of which 63% were literate. During World War I both the German and the Russian armies requisitioned food, horses, machinery and precious metals from the village. In 1916 a hailstorm struck Retkinia, causing massive damage in the fields, and further worsening the difficult wartime economic situation of the population. In the interwar period (1918-1939) the social structure of the village changed, accommodating many new craftsmen. In 1934 Retkinia was electrified (though some households were electrified as late as in 1951). World War II brought administrative change, as Łódź and the surrounding area were incorporated in the Third Reich as Wartheland. On 1 January 1940 Retkinia was incorporated into the city of Łódź by the German administration under the name of Erzhausen. The Polish population was evicted from their land in 1942-1943, and the total number of wartime casualties among the residents of Retkinia amounted to 144. The decision of the occupant regime to make Retkinia part of Łódź was reversed after the end of World War II, but not for long, and in 1946 the Polish authorities reincorporated the village into the city.

=== 1946–present ===
By 1956 Retkinia had a population of more than 5500, retaining much of its rural character. A tram link to the city centre was established in 1955. Tram no. 19 had its terminus by the fire station next to the church. The significance of the connection for the local community was commemorated by a monument erected in 2006, featuring tram wheels on a surviving section of the historical rails. The population reached 6000 by 1961.

In the 1960s a decision was made to construct a large housing estate of concrete panel buildings in Retkinia. Construction work began in 1971. According to initial plans, it was to accommodate as many as 120,000 people, but the area south of the railway tracks was eventually designated for single-family houses that were to form a separate estate, bringing the total envisaged number of residents in Retkinia down to c. 70-80,000. The estate was originally designed with an adequate number of green spaces, shops and other services, but public pressure and the demand for living quarters led to streamlining the construction effort to focus on blocks of flats only, resulting in a three-shift school system due to a shortage of school buildings coupled with a period of baby boom, and forcing many local residents to do their shopping in the city centre. The situation gradually improved in the 1980s. The quality of the blocks of flats also left much to be desired, with numerous complaints about flooded cellars and faulty heaters (which had to be replaced in more than 400 buildings) prompting the local authorities to undertake a massive program of repairs. Because of this situation the word ‘Retkinia’ accreted negative associations and was sometimes used in the 1980s as a generic term for an unwelcoming and ugly block housing estate. High-pressure gas installation in Retkinia proved to be dangerous, and in 1982 there was a gas explosion that led to two deaths. In 1983 another gas explosion demolished one of the buildings, leading to 8 casualties. This led to a complete remodelling of the gas network in Retkinia.

Following the construction of the housing district, the church, which by the late 1970s was too small for the growing congregation, was expanded. Construction work began in 1978 and continued well into the 1980s, although the main phase of construction finished by 1982. The building lost its Neogothic elements, but elements of the old belfry are still recognizable within the new structure.

Following the fall of communism in 1989, a number of new shopping centres, cafes and restaurants opened in Retkinia, and the district is now considered to be one of the most attractive places of residence in Łódź.

== Transport ==
=== Buses and trams ===
Retkinia bus and tram terminus, located at the western end of the housing estate, serves as a major public transport hub for the south-western part of the city of Łódź. Tram connections provide easy access to the city centre, and "[a] centrally laid tram line makes it one of the best served districts in the city for public transport." There are also direct bus connections to the Nowy Józefów industrial area, Port Łódź mall, as well as the nearby town of Konstantynów Łódzki. Another bus terminus (Kusocińskiego) is located nearby, on the northwestern edge of the housing estate.

=== Rail ===
Łódź Kaliska railway station, one of the two main stations in Łódź, is located only 1.5 km (0.93 mi) north-east of the housing estate’s eastern end and is served by a number of bus and tram routes that run between Retkinia and the city centre. The area is also served directly by Łódź Retkinia station, which is located on the south-eastern edge of the housing estate. The station was opened on 13 March 2021. Following the construction of a tunnel between Łódź Kaliska and Łódź Fabryczna stations, it will enable quick access to the Manufaktura complex and the city centre.

=== Air ===
The city of Łódź is served by Łódź Władysław Reymont Airport, located about 1.5 km (0.93 mi) south of Retkinia. Despite the short distance, no direct tram or bus connections provide access to the airport from Retkinia, but route 65, which serves the airport, allows for an easy interchange with buses that reach the inner core of the district.

== Parks and recreation ==
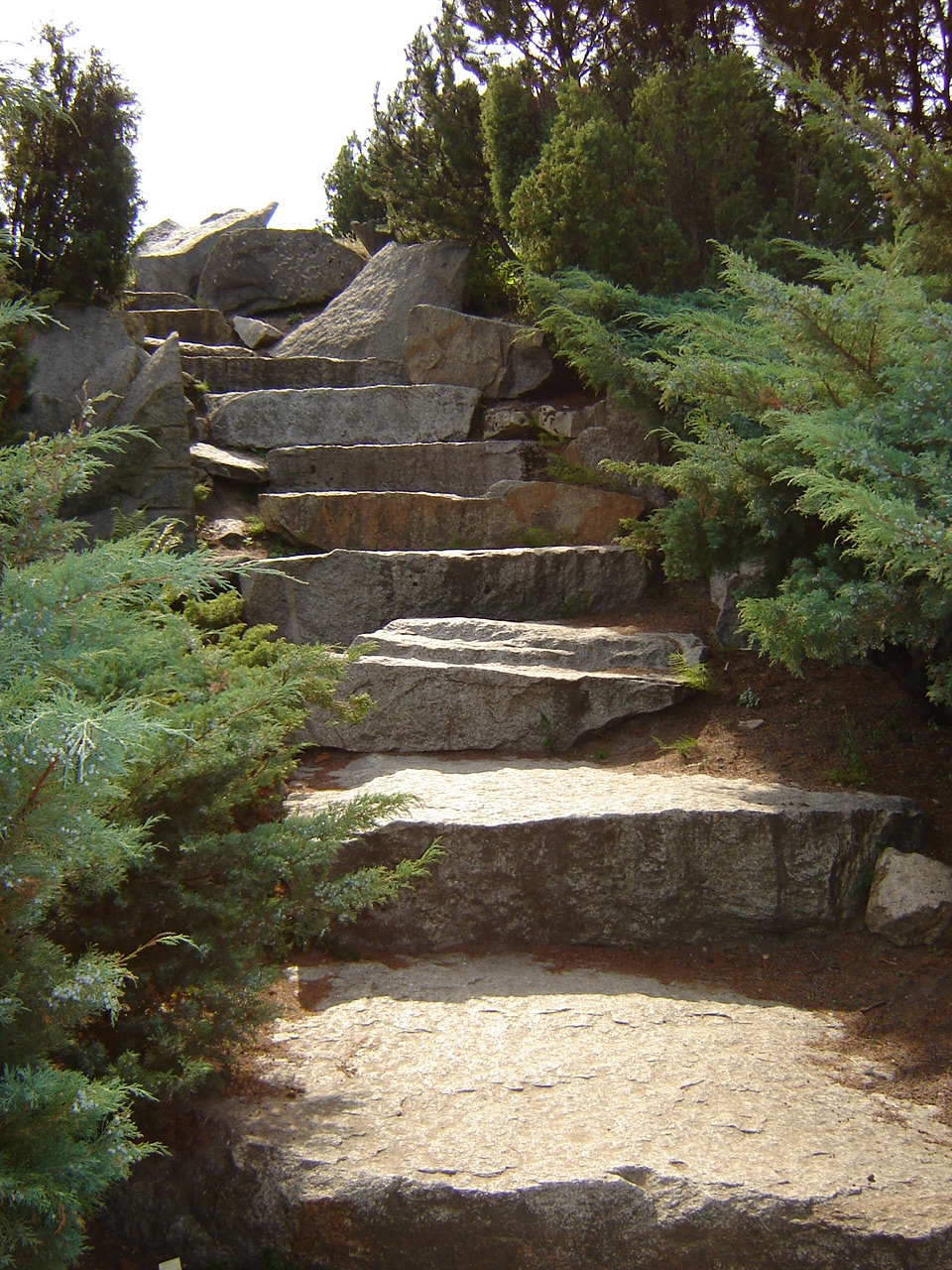
Rocky hillock in Łódź Botanical Garden

There are no municipal parks in Retkinia, but recreational green areas are to be found around the district, contiguous with its outer rim.

- Łódź Botanical Garden is adjacent to Retkinia from the north-east. One of the largest botanical gardens in Poland, it has an area of 67 hectares. There are twelve artificial hillocks in the garden, covered with granite, limestone and sandstone blocks. The highest of these host an alpine garden, and the remainder can be found in the Japanese garden, arboretum and Polish flora section. Łódź Zoo and Zdrowie Park (the largest in the city) are located on the far end of the Botanical Garden and together they comprise a vast green area serving the needs of not only Retkinia but the entire city.
- Las Lublinek, the city’s second largest municipal forest (with an area of 90,43 hectares), is located 2 km (1.2 mi) south of Retkinia (on the south side of the Warsaw-Kalisz railway), and its woodland area and ponds attract many residents of the district. The area between the forest and Retkinia has been transformed into a woodland park in recent years, forming a continuous green area of more than 140 hectares, with a stretch of green land north of the railway also turned into a park, further extending the recreational area south of the district.
- To the north-west of Retkinia, an open field and woodland area leads to the nearby district of Brus. The Brus Tram Depot, transformed into a public transport museum, and a World War II bomb shelter open to visitors are only 0.6 km (0.37 mi) away from Retkinia’s northern end. Both the depot and the shelter are open to the public on selected days during the summer season.

== Other attractions and places of interest ==
There are a few notable public sculptures in Retkinia, and a large-scale mural that is part of the Urban Forms Gallery of murals in Łódź.

- Morela retkińska (literally The Apricot of Retkinia) is a sculpture designed by Ryszard Popow, a graduate of Strzemiński Academy of Art in Łódź. The piece was constructed in 1975. Its name refers not to apricots but to the surname of the French artist François Morellet, whose work Sphère-Trame inspired Popow. The sculpture is an example of geometrical abstract art.
- Bociany (The Storks) is a sculpture by Michał Gałkiewicz, professor at Strzemiński Academy of Art in Łódź. The piece presents five storks whose beaks face one another. The sculpture stands at the eastern end of the housing estate, at the point of entry to Retkinia from the city centre, and it is considered to be a symbol of the district. Gałkiewicz is also the author of another sculpture, Macierzyństwo (Maternity), which presents a mother embracing her children.
- I believe in goats is a mural by the Chilean artist INTI, painted on one of the many blocks of flats in Retkinia. The painting was executed in 2013 and sparked a great deal of controversy due to its religious connotations. The mural is almost 35 metres high and presents the figure of a traveller surrounded by goats.
