= Jajczaki =

- Village
- Location within Poland
- Coordinates: 51°10′2″N 18°39′26″E
- Country: Poland
- Voivodeship: Łódź
- County: Wieluń
- Gmina: Wierzchlas

Jajczaki [jai̯ˈt͡ʂaki] is a village in the administrative district of Gmina Wierzchlas, within Wieluń County, Łódź Voivodeship, in central Poland.
