= Broników, Wieluń County =

Broników
- Village
- Location within Poland
- Coordinates: 51°10′56″N 18°48′24″E
- Country: Poland
- Voivodeship: Łódź
- County: Wieluń
- Gmina: Wierzchlas

Broników [brɔˈnikuf] is a village in the administrative district of Gmina Wierzchlas, within Wieluń County, Łódź Voivodeship, in central Poland.
