= Sieradz Voivodeship (1339–1793) =

Former administrative division of the Kingdom of Poland

Coordinates: 51°35′34″N 18°43′50″E

Sieradz Voivodeship Województwo sieradzkie Palatinatus Siradiensis
- Voivodeship of Poland^{[a]}
- 1339–1793
- Coat of arms

- The Sieradz Voivodeship in the Polish–Lithuanian Commonwealth in 1635.
- Capital: Sieradz
- Area
- 11,689.53 km^{2} (4,513.35 sq mi)
- History
  - Established: 1339
  - Second partition: 25 September 1793
- Political subdivisions: counties: six (four, plus two counties of Wieluń Land)
| Preceded by | Succeeded by |
| Duchy of Sieradz / Duchy of Sieradz | South Prussia |
- Today part of: Poland
- ^a Voivodeship of the Kingdom of Poland. The kingdom was part of the Polish–Lithuanian Commonwealth from 1569.

Sieradz Voivodeship (Polish: Województwo sieradzkie, Latin: Palatinatus Siradiensis) was a unit of administrative division and local government in the Crown of the Kingdom of Poland and the Polish–Lithuanian Commonwealth, from 1339 to the second partition of Poland in 1793. It was a part of the Greater Poland Province.

The seat of the voivode was in Sieradz, while local sejmiks took place in Szadek.

== History ==
The history of Sieradz Voivodeship dates back to the year 1138, when following the Testament of Bolesław III Krzywousty, Poland was divided into several smaller duchies. One of them was the Duchy of Sieradz, which until the 1260s was part of the Duchy of Łęczyca. In 1290–1300, and after 1306, Sieradz was ruled by Duke Wladyslaw Lokietek, who incorporated it back into the Kingdom of Poland. In 1339, Wladyslaw Lokietek created Sieradz Voivodeship out of the former Duchy. In the west, it bordered Kalisz Voivodeship and the Duchies of Silesia; in the north, along the Ner river, it bordered Łęczyca Voivodeship; in the east it bordered Sandomierz Voivodeship along the Pilica river from Koniecpol to Białobrzegi; and in the south it bordered Kraków Voivodeship, partly along the Liswarta river.

The voivodeship had the area of 161.84 old-Polish sq. miles (= 8,912.87 km^{2} (3,441.28 sq mi)) (1 old-Polish mile: 7,5-8.5 km), with four powiaty (counties). When in 1396 the Wieluń Land returned to Poland, it became part of Sieradz Voivodeship, which increased the area to 212.25 old-Polish sq. miles (11,689.53 km^{2} (4,513.35 sq mi)), and the number of counties to six. In the mid-16th century, the voivodeship (without the Wieluń Land) had 127 Roman Catholic parishes, 29 towns and 938 villages, while the Land of Wieluń had 67 parishes, 13 towns and 182 villages. Sieradz Voivodeship had five senators: the Voivode of Sieradz, the Castellan of Sieradz, and the Castellans of Rozprza, Spycimierz and Konary. Main starostas resided in Sieradz and Piotrków Trybunalski, there also were starostas at Radomsko, Szadek, Tuszyn, Klonowa, Warta and other locations. The sejmiks at Szadek elected four deputies to the Sejm, and two deputies to the Greater Poland Tribunal in Piotrków Trybunalski.

Wieluń Land, with the area of 50.41 old-Polish sq. miles, had its own administrative system and a senator, who was the Castellan of Wieluń. It also had its own starostas, residing at Wieluń, Ostrzeszów, Grabów nad Prosną, and Bolesławiec, and elected two deputies to the Sejm, at the separate sejmiks in Wieluń. Furthermore, the Voivode of Sieradz named his deputy, who ruled the Wieluń Land.

== Administration ==
Governor seat:

- Sieradz

Voivodes:

- Kasper Doenhoff (1634–1645)

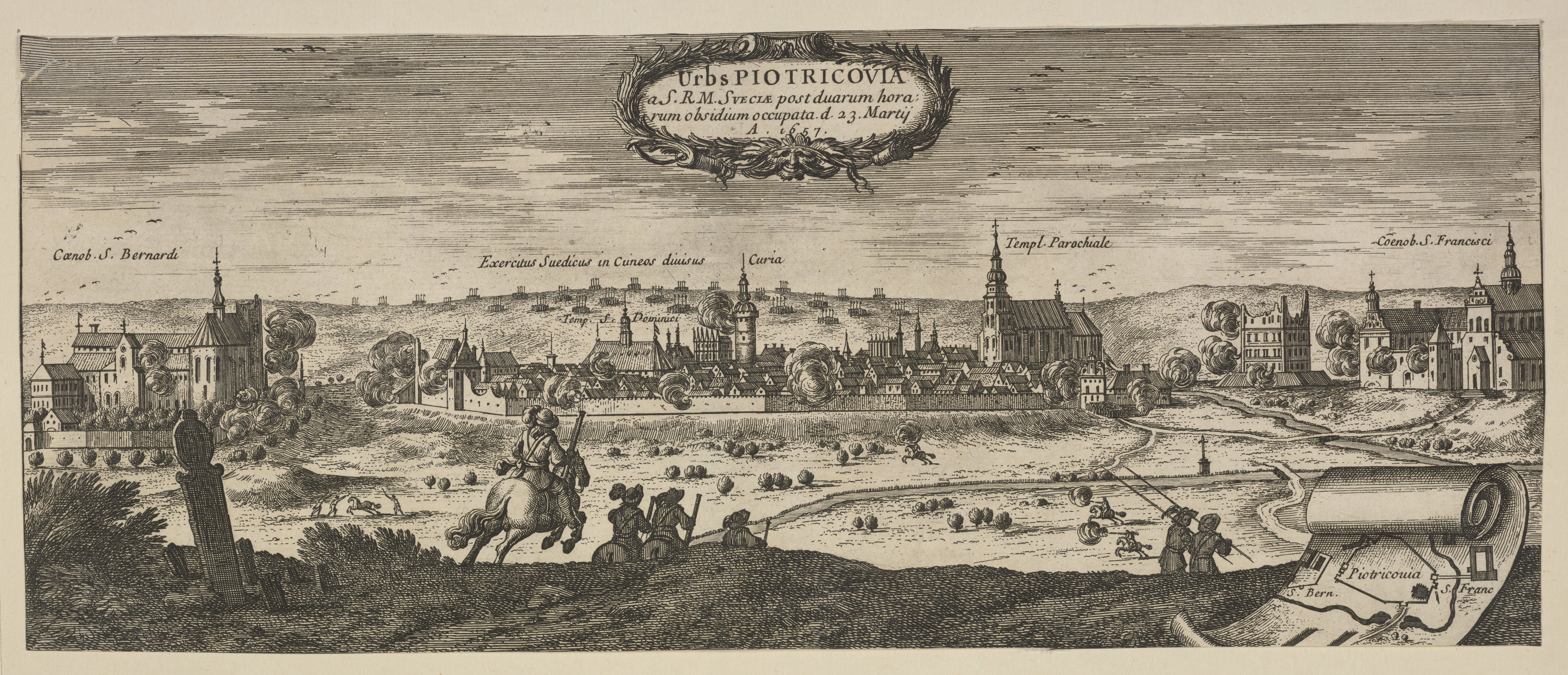
Piotrków, county and Crown Tribunal seat, in the 17th century

Administrative division:

- Sieradz County,
- Piotrków Trybunalski County,
- Radomsko County,
- Szadek County
- Wieluń Land, divided into:
  - Wieluń County,
  - Ostrzeszów County

Regional council seats:

- Szadek
- Wieluń

Crown tribunal seat:

- Piotrków Trybunalski

== Cities and towns ==
=== Piotrków County ===
- Grocholice
- Piotrków
- Rozprza
- Rzgów
- Sulejów
- Tuszyn
- Wolbórz

=== Ostrzeszów County ===
- Baranów
- Grabów nad Prosną
- Kobyla Góra
- Mikstat
- Ostrzeszów
- Wodziczna

=== Radomsko County ===
- Kamieńsk
- Koniecpol
- Nowa Brzeźnica
- Pajęczno
- Pławno
- Radomsko
- Żytno

=== Sieradz County ===
- Błaszki
- Burzenin
- Dobra
- Sieradz
- Staw
- Szczerców
- Turek
- Warta
- Widawa
- Złoczew

=== Szadek County ===
- Buczek, Łask County
- Lutomiersk
- Łask
- Pabianice
- Szadek
- Uniejów

=== Wieluń County ===
- Bolesławiec
- Działoszyn
- Kamion
- Lututów
- Osjaków
- Toporów
- Wieluń
- Wieruszów

== Neighbouring voivodeships ==
- Kalisz Voivodeship
- Łęczyca Voivodeship
- Sandomierz Voivodeship
- Kraków Voivodeship
- Silesia

== Sources ==
- Sieradz Voivodeship, description by Zygmunt Gloger
