= Andrzej Gajewski (politician) =

Polish physician and politician

Voivode of Białystok Voivodeship
- In office October 1994 – 1997
- President: Lech Wałęsa; Aleksander Kwaśniewski
- Prime Minister: Waldemar Pawlak; Józef Oleksy; Włodzimierz Cimoszewicz
- Preceded by: Stanisław Prutis
- Succeeded by: Krystyna Łukaszuk

Personal details
- Born: April 11, 1944 Warsaw, German-occupied Poland
- Died: 29 August 2016 (aged 72)
- Citizenship: Poland
- Education: Medical University of Białystok
- Occupation: Radiologist, politician

Andrzej Jerzy Gajewski (born April 11, 1944, in Warsaw – August 29, 2016 in Białystok) was a Polish radiologist, academic teacher and politician, doctor of medical sciences who served as Voivode of Białystok Voivodeship from 1994 to 1997.

== Biography ==
Son of Jerzy and Halina. From 1966 to 1972 he studied at the Medical University of Białystok. He obtained specialization in radiology and radiodiagnostics. He obtained his doctorate in medical sciences. After graduating, he worked at his alma mater as an assistant, senior assistant and lecturer (until 1981), then in the Department of Radiology. He served as director of the State Clinical Hospital in Białystok (1988–1994). From February to October 1994, he held the position of deputy Voivode of Białystok Voivodeship, then until his dismissal in 1997, he served as voivode. After leaving this office, he worked again at the Medical University of Białystok. From 2002, he was the director of the Podlaskie Voivodeship branch of National Disabled Persons Rehabilitation Fund (PFRON). He lectured at the State Higher Vocational School in Suwałki.

He was a member of the main audit committee of the "Ordynacka" Association. In 1997 he received the Knight's Cross of the Order of Polonia Restituta.
