= Strugi, Łódź Voivodeship =

Strugi
- Village
- Location within Poland
- Coordinates: 51°9′34″N 18°38′53″E
- Country: Poland
- Voivodeship: Łódź
- County: Wieluń
- Gmina: Wierzchlas

Strugi [ˈstruɡi] is a village in the administrative district of Gmina Wierzchlas, within Wieluń County, Łódź Voivodeship, in central Poland.
