= Szadek =

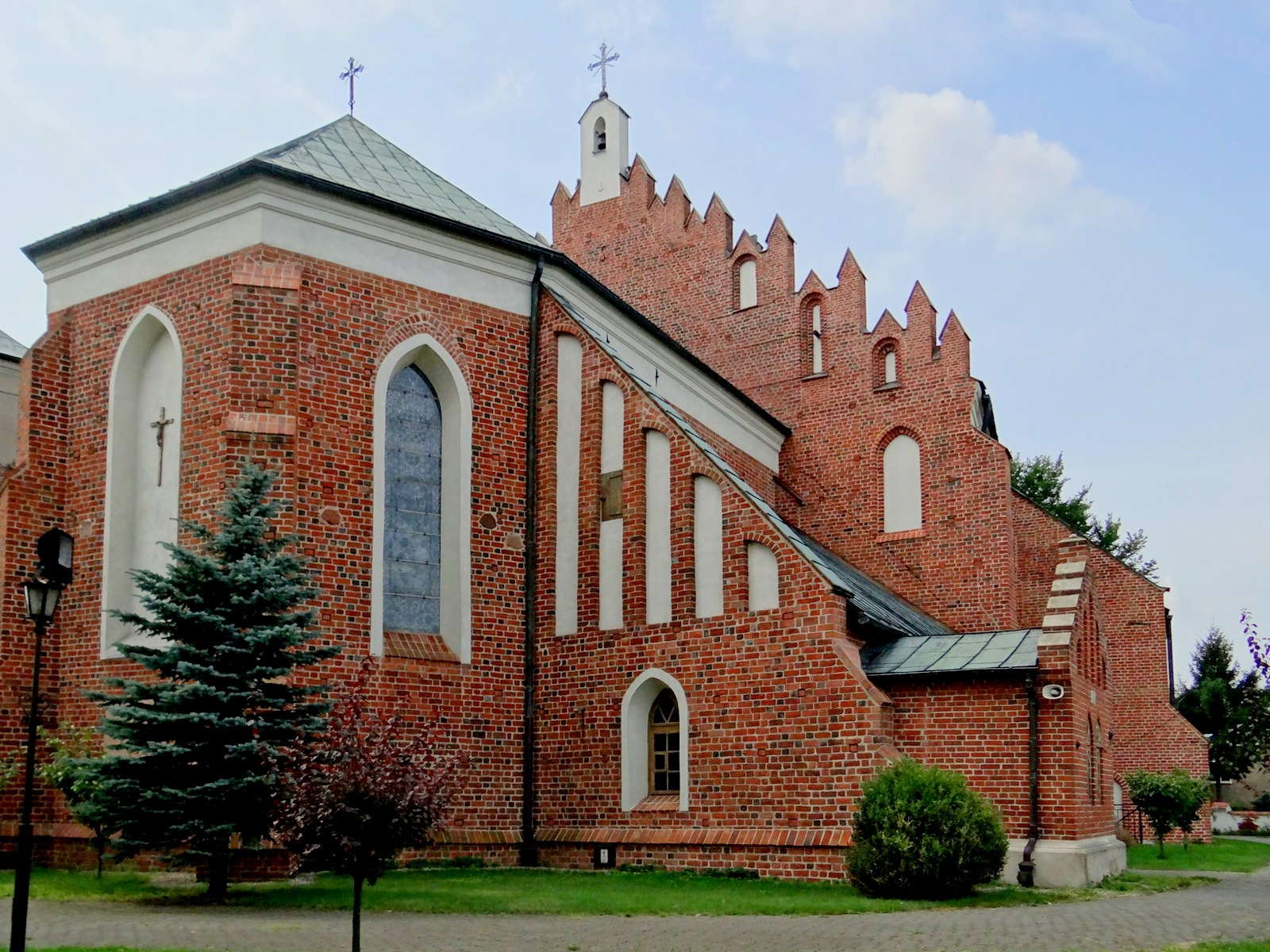
- Gothic church of the Assumption in Szadek

- Coat of arms

- Location within Poland
- Coordinates: 51°41′30″N 18°58′45″E
- Country: Poland
- Voivodeship: Łódź
- County: Zduńska Wola
- Gmina: Szadek
- First mentioned: 1295

Government
  - Mayor: Artur Ławniczak

Area
  - Total: 17.99 km^{2} (6.95 sq mi)

Population (31 December 2020)
  - Total: 1,898 ▼
  - Density: 105.5/km^{2} (273.3/sq mi)
- Time zone: UTC+1 (CET)
  - Summer (DST): UTC+2 (CEST)
- Postal code: 98-240
- Vehicle registration: EZD
- Website: http://www.szadek.net

Szadek [ˈʂadɛk] is a town in Zduńska Wola County, Łódź Voivodeship, Poland, with 1,898 inhabitants (2020). It is located in the Sieradz Land.

== History ==
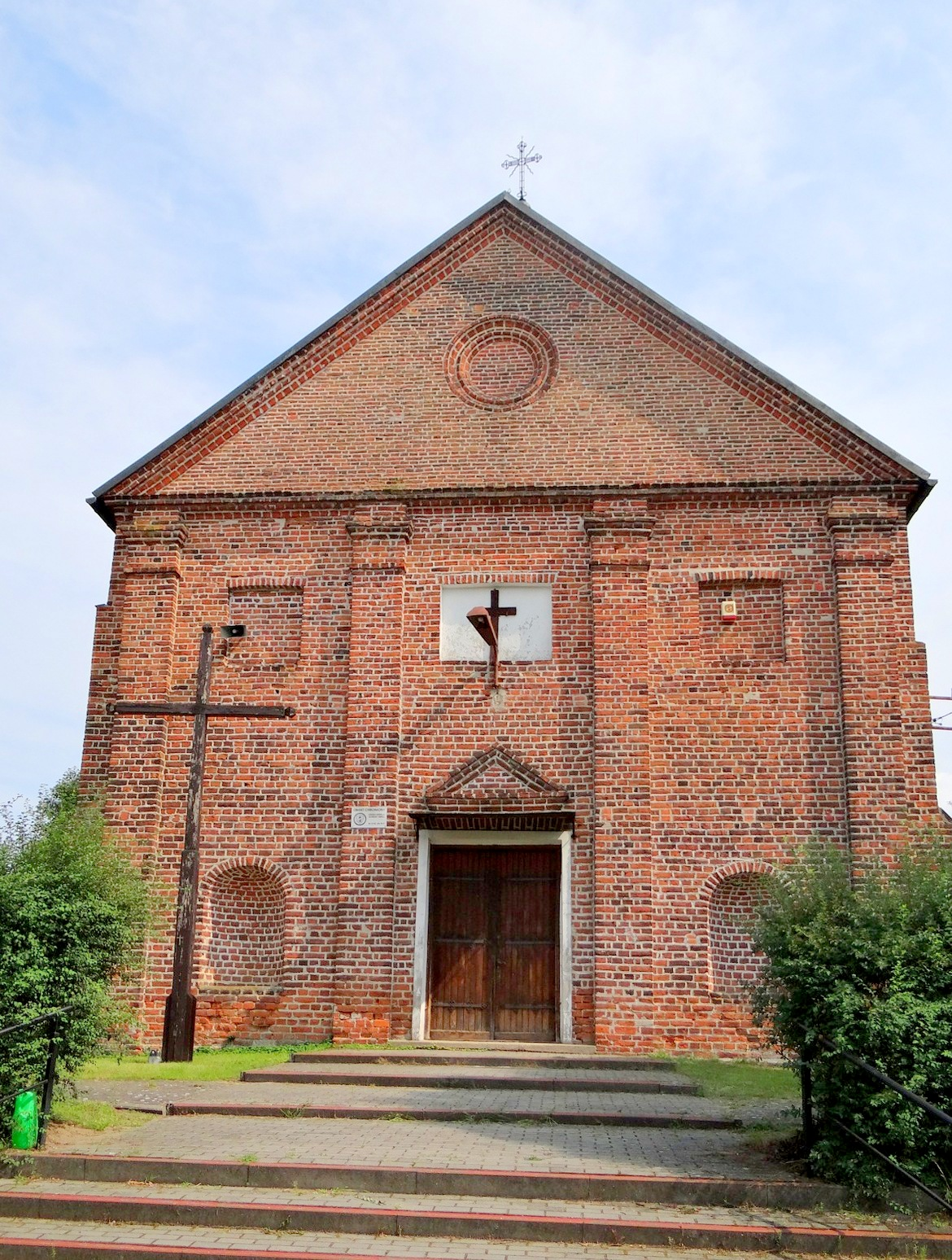
Saint Giles church

The oldest known mention of the town comes from 1295, when it was part of fragmented Piast-ruled Poland. It was a county seat and royal town of the Polish Crown, administratively located in the Sieradz Voivodeship in the Greater Poland Province.

In 1921, there were 535 Jews out of the total 3,058 residents in Szadek. At that time, the Jewish population was concentrated mostly along Sieradzka Street, where they constituted almost 90% of inhabitants.

During the joint German-Soviet invasion of Poland, which started World War II in September 1939, the town was captured by German forces. Under the German occupation, Jews were robbed and subject to forced labour without pay, some working in the community, others sent to labor camps, and Poles were subjected to expulsions and deportations to forced labour. In 1940, the Germans expelled 102 Poles, who were then detained in a transit camp in Łódź and either deported to forced labour in Germany or deported in freight trains to the General Government in the more-eastern part of German-occupied Poland, while their homes were handed over to German colonists as part of the Lebensraum policy. Also in 1940, five Poles from Szadek were murdered by the Soviets in the large Katyn massacre.

In 1940, the 410 Jews remaining in the town were given three hours notice that they were to move to a ghetto where they lived in poverty and with terrible hygienic conditions. On 14 August 1942, all of Szadek's Jewish community were deported to the Chełmno extermination camp where they were immediately gassed. There were fewer than twenty survivors from the Szadek Jewish committee. One Polish woman hid a Jewish woman, saving her life, and after the war was honored by Yad Vashem as Righteous Among the Nations. German occupation ended in 1945 and the town was restored to Poland.

== Transport ==
Szadek lies on the intersection of vovoideship roads 710 and 473.

The nearest railway is in Zduńska Wola to the south.
