= Łaszew, Greater Poland Voivodeship =

Łaszew
- Village
- Location within Poland
- Coordinates: 51°51′54″N 17°46′39″E
- Country: Poland
- Voivodeship: Greater Poland
- County: Pleszew
- Municipality: Pleszew
- Time zone: UTC+1 (CET)
  - Summer (DST): UTC+2 (CEST)
- Postal code: 63-300
- Area code: +48 91
- Vehicle registration: PPL

Łaszew is a village in Greater Poland Voivodeship, Poland, located within the municipality of Pleszew within Pleszew County.
