= Kraszkowice =

- Village
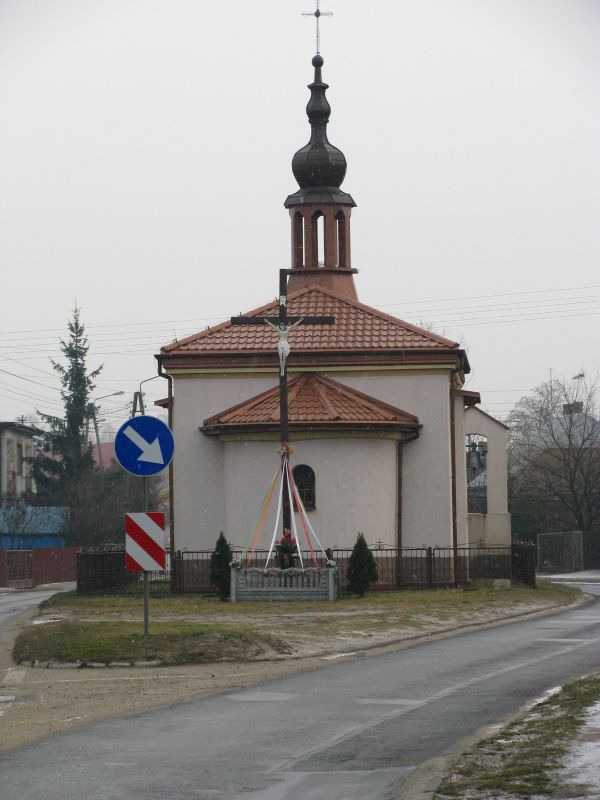
- Chapel of Saint Anne

- Location within Poland
- Coordinates: 51°11′N 18°42′E
- Country: Poland
- Voivodeship: Łódź
- County: Wieluń
- Gmina: Wierzchlas

Kraszkowice [kraʂkɔˈvit͡sɛ] is a village in the administrative district of Gmina Wierzchlas, within Wieluń County, Łódź Voivodeship, in central Poland.
