= Dobroń railway station =

Railway station in Dobroń, Poland

Dobroń

General information
- Location: Dobroń, Łódź Voivodeship; Poland
- Coordinates: 51.6293°N 19.2408°E
- System: commuter station
- Line: 14 Łódź-Tuplice railway
- Platforms: 2
- Tracks: 2

History
- Opened: 1927
- Electrified: 1965
- Former names: Dobberwalde (1943-45)

Passengers
- 2017: 150-199

Services
Preceding station	Polregio	Following station
Kolumna towards Ostrów Wielkopolski or Poznań Główny	IR	Chechło towards Warszawa Główna
Kolumna towards Ostrów Wielkopolski or Poznań Główny	PR	Chechło towards Łódź Kaliska
Preceding station	ŁKA	Following station
Chechło towards Łódź Widzew	Łódź - Sieradz	Kolumna towards Sieradz
Location

Dobroń is a commuter station and a block post located in the village of Dobroń, in Pabianice County, Łódź Voivodeship, Poland, serving a section of Łódź-Tuplice railway between Pabianice and Łask stations.

The station was opened in 1927. Electrification took place in 1965. The station consists of two platforms, each serving one track of the railway, a single-level secured crossroad and the signalling control building. Station only serves regional trains of Łódź Agglomeration Railway from Łódź to Sieradz and PolRegio trains from Łódź to Poznań and Wrocław.

Due to upgrades of the railway, since 2018 the station was repurposed as a temporary branch post, by installing two switches between the tracks on the western side of the station. After refurbishment is done, this will become an automatic block post.

== Train services ==
The station is served by the following services:

- InterRegio services (IR) Ostrów Wielkopolski — Łódź — Warszawa Główna
- InterRegio services (IR) Poznań Główny — Ostrów Wielkopolski — Łódź — Warszawa Główna
- Regiona services (PR) Łódź Kaliska — Ostrów Wielkopolski
- Regional services (PR) Łódź Kaliska — Ostrów Wielkopolski — Poznań Główny
