= Kolumna railway station =

Railway station in Łask, Poland

Coordinates: 51°36′53″N 19°11′44″E

Kolumna
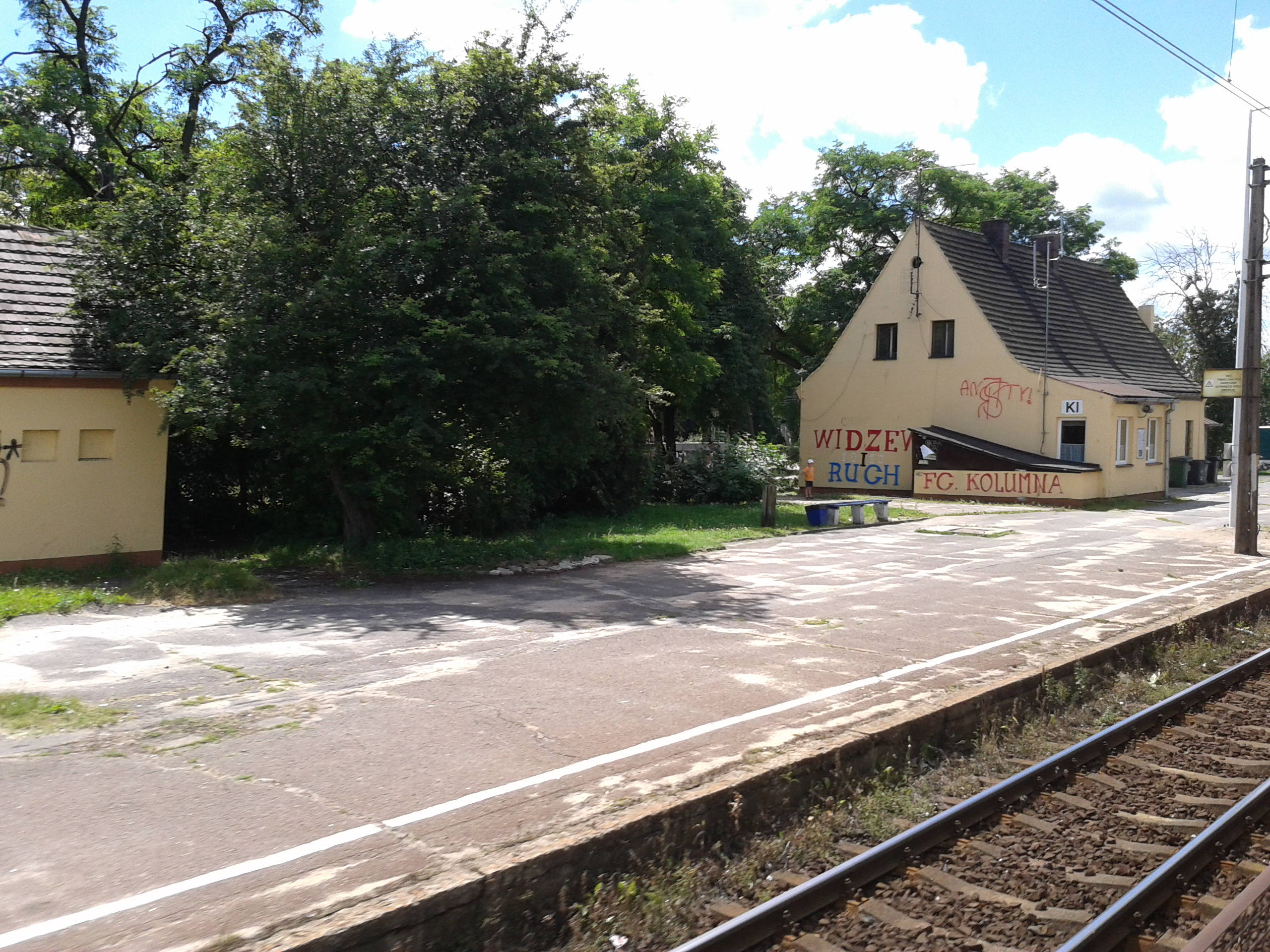
- A platform of the station, along with the main building

General information
- Location: Łask, Łódź Voivodeship; Poland
- System: commuter station
- Line: 14 Łódź-Forst (Lausitz) railway
- Platforms: 2
- Tracks: 2

History
- Opened: 1928
- Electrified: 1965
- Former names: Waldhorst (1941-1945)

Services
Preceding station	Polregio	Following station
Łask towards Ostrów Wielkopolski or Poznań Główny	IR	Dobroń towards Warszawa Główna
Łask towards Ostrów Wielkopolski or Poznań Główny	PR	Dobroń towards Łódź Kaliska
Preceding station	ŁKA	Following station
Dobroń towards Łódź Widzew	Łódź - Sieradz	Łask towards Sieradz
Pabianice towards Łódź Fabryczna	Łódź - Poznań (jointly operated with Greater Poland Railways)	Łask towards Poznań Główny
Preceding station	KW	Following station
Łask towards Poznań Główny	Poznań - Łódź (Co-operated with Łódzka Kolej Aglomeracyjna)	Pabianice towards Łódź Kaliska
Location

Kolumna is a commuter railway station located in the town of Łask, Łódź Voivodeship, in Kolumna district. Initially, in years 1928-1973 it was serving the leisure settlement under the same name. It also serves as block post between Łask and Dobroń stations.

== Overview ==
The station consists of two side platforms and main building used for signalling control. The cash office was closed in 2015. A passage between platforms is provided through secured road crossing located next to the station.

The station serves only PolRegio regional trains from Łódź to Poznań and Wrocław, and ŁKA commuter trains to Sieradz.

== Train services ==
The station is served by the following services:

- InterRegio services (IR) Ostrów Wielkopolski — Łódź — Warszawa Główna
- InterRegio services (IR) Poznań Główny — Ostrów Wielkopolski — Łódź — Warszawa Główna
- Regiona services (PR) Łódź Kaliska — Ostrów Wielkopolski
- Regional services (PR) Łódź Kaliska — Ostrów Wielkopolski — Poznań Główny
