= Łódź Chojny railway station =

Railway station in Poland

Coordinates: 51°43′35.11″N 19°29′03.11″E

Łódź Chojny
- Łódź Chojny station in 2025

General information
- Location: Łódź, Poland
- Owner: Polish State Railways
- Lines: Łódź Circular Line; 25 Łódź - Dębica line; 540 to Łódź Widzew
- Platforms: 4

History
- Opened: 1903
- Electrified: 1958
- Former names: Chojny (1903-1940); Litzmannstadt Süd (1940-1945)

Services
Preceding station	PKP Intercity	Following station
Łódź Kaliska towards Gdynia Główna	IC	Łódź Widzew towards Łódź Fabryczna
Łódź Kaliska towards Gdynia Główna	IC	Łódź Widzew towards Bielsko-Biała Główna
Łódź Widzew towards Warszawa Wschodnia	IC Via Łódź	Pabianice towards Wrocław Główny
Łódź Widzew towards Białystok	IC Via Łódź	Pabianice towards Wrocław Główny
Łódź Widzew towards Ełk	IC	Pabianice towards Wrocław Główny
Łódź Widzew towards Warszawa Wschodnia	IC	Łódź Retkinia towards Zgorzelec
Łódź Kaliska towards Katowice	TLK	Łódź Widzew towards Gdynia Główna
Preceding station	Polregio	Following station
Łódź Pabianicka towards Łódź Kaliska, Ostrów Wielkopolski or Poznań Główny	IR	Łódź Dąbrowa towards Warszawa Główna
Łódź Pabianicka towards Łódź Kaliska	PR	Łódź Olechów Wiadukt towards Częstochowa
Łódź Pabianicka towards Łódź Kaliska	PR	Łódź Dąbrowa towards Skarżysko-Kamienna
Preceding station	ŁKA	Following station
Łódź Dąbrowa towards Łódź Widzew	Łódź - Toruń	Łódź Pabianicka towards Toruń
Łódź Dąbrowa towards Łódź Widzew	Łódź - Łowicz	Łódź Pabianicka towards Łowicz Główny
Łódź Dąbrowa towards Łódź Fabryczna	Łódź Widzew - Łódź Kaliska - Zgierz	Łódź Pabianicka towards Zgierz
Łódź Olechów Wiadukt towards Łódź Fabryczna	Łódź Widzew - Łódź Kaliska - Zgierz	Łódź Pabianicka towards Zgierz
Łódź Dąbrowa towards Łódź Widzew	Łódź - Sieradz	Łódź Pabianicka towards Sieradz
Łódź Dąbrowa towards Łódź Fabryczna	Łódź - Poznań (jointly operated with Greater Poland Railways)	Łódź Pabianicka towards Poznań Główny
Location

Łódź Chojny (Polish pronunciation: [xɔjnɨ]) is a railway station in Łódź, Poland, located in Górna district. Being an essential part of circular line, it serves the traffic between Łódź Kaliska and Łódź Widzew stations, and since 2011 it serves most of PKP Intercity trains passing through Łódź, mostly running between Warsaw and Wrocław.

== History ==
The station was opened alongside the circular line running from Widzew station to Łódź Kaliska in 1903. Initially it served both passenger and freight trains. In 1906 it was incorporated into the city of Łódź along with Chojny settlement, which was served by the station. During World War I track gauge was changed from 1524 mm to 1435 mm. In 1941 the station received a connection with Łódź Olechów cargo station. Electrification of the station took place in 1958.

In the 20th century, up until the 1990s, the station was a stopping point for international routes: Warsaw - Paris and Prague - Moscow. In 2002 the station was excluded from passenger services, serving only freight trains.

The station was reopened for passengers in 2011 due to closure and general reconstruction of Łódź Fabryczna station. Between 2011 and 2015 the station building was refurbished. Since 2015 the station is one of the significant elements of Łódź Metropolitan Railway.

== Train services ==
The station is served by the following services:

- Intercity services (IC) Łódź Fabryczna — Bydgoszcz — Gdynia Główna
- Intercity services (IC) Gdynia - Gdańsk - Bydgoszcz - Toruń - Kutno - Łódź - Częstochowa - Katowice - Bielsko-Biała
- Intercity services (IC) Białystok - Warszawa - Łódź - Ostrów Wielkopolski - Wrocław
- Intercity services (IC) Wrocław Główny — Łódź — Warszawa Wschodnia
- Intercity services (IC) Zgorzelec - Legnica - Wrocław - Ostrów Wielkopolski - Łódź - Warszawa
- Intercity services (TLK) Gdynia Główna — Bydgoszcz/Grudziądz — Łódź — Katowice
- InterRegio services (IR) Łódź Kaliska — Warszawa Glowna
- InterRegio services (IR) Ostrów Wielkopolski — Łódź — Warszawa Główna
- InterRegio services (IR) Poznań Główny — Ostrów Wielkopolski — Łódź — Warszawa Główna
- Regional services (PR) Łódź Kaliska — Częstochowa
- Regional services (PR) Łódź Kaliska — Skarżysko-Kamienna
