= Łódź Pabianicka railway station =

Railway station in Łódź, Poland

Coordinates: 51°43′35.15″N 19°26′42″E

Łódź Pabianicka
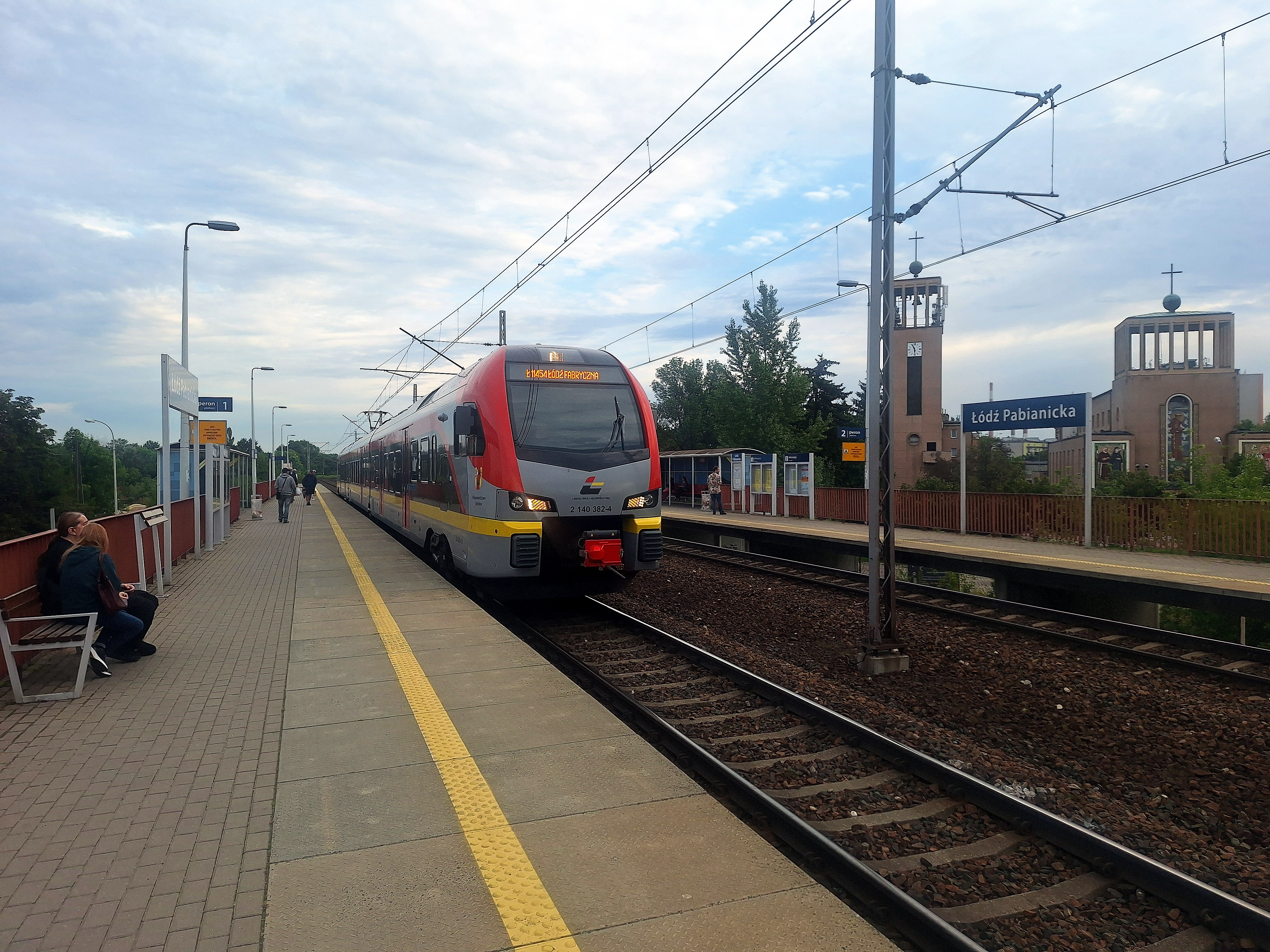
- A platform of the station

General information
- Location: Łódź, Górna district Poland
- System: Commuter Station
- Owner: Polish State Railways, Łódź Voivodeship
- Lines: Łódź Circular Line; 25 Łódź - Dębica line
- Platforms: 2
- Tracks: 2

Construction
- Accessible: elevators

History
- Opened: 15 December 2013

Services
Preceding station	Polregio	Following station
Łódź Kaliska towards Łódź Kaliska, Ostrów Wielkopolski or Poznań Główny	IR	Łódź Chojny towards Warszawa Główna
Łódź Kaliska Terminus	PR	Łódź Chojny towards Częstochowa
Łódź Kaliska Terminus	PR	Łódź Chojny towards Skarżysko-Kamienna
Preceding station	ŁKA	Following station
Łódź Chojny towards Łódź Widzew	Łódź - Toruń	Łódź Kaliska towards Toruń
Łódź Chojny towards Łódź Widzew	Łódź - Łowicz	Łódź Kaliska towards Łowicz Główny
Łódź Chojny towards Łódź Fabryczna	Łódź Widzew - Łódź Kaliska - Zgierz	Łódź Kaliska towards Zgierz
Łódź Chojny towards Łódź Widzew	Łódź - Sieradz	Łódź Kaliska towards Sieradz
Łódź Chojny towards Łódź Fabryczna	Łódź - Poznań (jointly operated with Greater Poland Railways)	Łódź Kaliska towards Poznań Główny
Location

A Łódź Pabianicka (Polish pronunciation: [pabianit͡ska]) is a commuter station located in the city of Łódź, Poland, in Górna district, on a circular line between Łódź Kaliska and Łódź Chojny stations, in direct vicinity of the crossroads of Pabianicka St with John Paul II Avenue and Górna Road.

The station was opened in 2013, as part of Łódź Commuter Railway project. It consists of two single-edged platforms located north to the railway viaduct over Pabianicka street. Each platform is equipped with a small shelter with benches, a board with current schedule, a staircase and an elevator. A passage between platforms is provided through an under-track passage for a pavement running along the street.

The station serves ŁKA commuter trains running between Łódź Kaliska and Łódź Widzew stations, along with Polregio regional trains from Łódź Kaliska to Częstochowa and Opoczno. Up to 2017 it was also a stopping point for PKP Intercity trains between Warsaw and Wrocław.

== Train services ==
The station is served by the following services:

- InterRegio services (IR) Łódź Kaliska — Warszawa Glowna
- InterRegio services (IR) Ostrów Wielkopolski — Łódź — Warszawa Główna
- InterRegio services (IR) Poznań Główny — Ostrów Wielkopolski — Łódź — Warszawa Główna
- Regional services (PR) Łódź Kaliska — Częstochowa
- Regional services (PR) Łódź Kaliska — Skarżysko-Kamienna
