= Pabianice railway station =

Railway station in Poland

Coordinates: 51°39′46″N 19°19′42″E

Pabianice
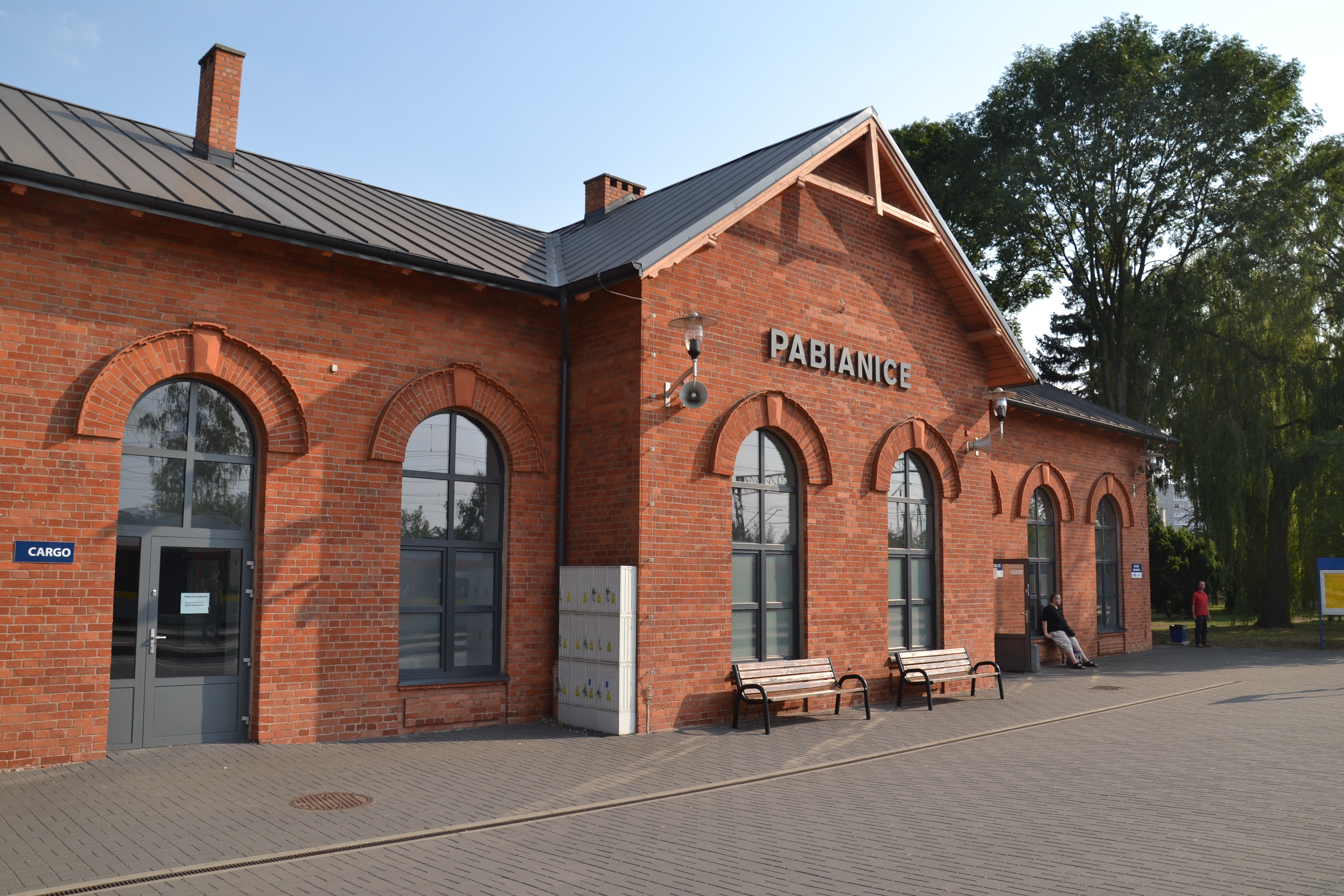

General information
- Location: Pabianice, Łódź Voivodeship, Poland
- System: Regional station
- Owner: Polish State Railways
- Line: 14 Łódź-Forst (Lausitz) railway
- Platforms: 2

History
- Opened: 1902
- Rebuilt: 2019 - 2020
- Electrified: 1965

Passengers
- 2018: 1300

Services
Preceding station	PKP Intercity	Following station
Łódź Chojny towards Białystok	IC	Łask towards Wrocław Główny
Łódź Chojny towards Giżycko	IC	Łask towards Wrocław Główny
Łódź Chojny towards Kraków Główny	IC	Łask towards Poznań Główny
Preceding station	Polregio	Following station
Pabianice Północne towards Łódź Kaliska or Łódź Widzew	PR	Chechło towards Ostrów Wielkopolski or Poznań Główny
Preceding station	ŁKA	Following station
Pabianice Północne towards Łódź Widzew	Łódź - Sieradz	Chechło towards Sieradz
Łódź Retkinia towards Łódź Fabryczna	Łódź - Poznań (jointly operated with Greater Poland Railways)	Kolumna towards Poznań Główny
Preceding station	KW	Following station
Kolumna towards Poznań Główny	Poznań - Łódź (Co-operated with Łódzka Kolej Aglomeracyjna)	Pabianice Północne towards Łódź Kaliska
Location

Pabianice station is a railway station located in the town of Pabianice, Łódź Voivodeship, Poland. According to PKP it has the status of a regional station. It serves mainly regional traffic between Łódź and Sieradz, although it is also a stopping point for PKP Intercity services between Warsaw and Wrocław.

== History ==
The station was built as part of the Warsaw-Kalisz Railway, which was opened in 1902. The main building of the station was made in the Renaissance Revival style, the same which was used for other smaller stations of the line such as those in Łowicz, Zgierz, Łask, Zduńska Wola and Sieradz. Unlike some of the latter stations, this one has retained its original facades despite major refurbishment in 1934, 2005 and 2011.

From 1902 until 2019 the station utilized 3 platforms: one single-edged and two double-edged, but each platform acted like single-edged. From 2019 till September 2020 the platform layout of the station was changed due to refurbishment of the railway served by station. The new layout consists of one island platform and one side platform, each connected with an underground passage.

From 1924 to 1968 the station served as a terminal stop for a tram line, which runs from Łódź via Ksawerów. In 1968 the tram terminal was dismantled after the construction of a turning loop near the intersection of Łaska and Wiejska streets, located 300 m southwest of the station.

== Public transit ==
The station is served by bus lines maintained by MZK Pabianice (bold name indicates terminal stop):

- Line 1: **Dworzec PKP** - Waltera-Jankego
- Line 3: **Dworzec PKP** - Sikorskiego
- Line 5: **Dworzec PKP** - Waltera-Jankego
- Line 260: Waltera-Jankego - Dworzec PKP - Kudrowice - Górka Pabianicka
- Line 262: Waltera-Jankego - Dworzec PKP - Kudrowice
- Line 265: **Dworzec PKP** - Pawlikowice (selected services)
- Line T: **Dworzec PKP** - Rzgów - Guzew

Moreover, the area of the station is served by two lines operated by MPK Łódź:

- Tram line **41** (Łódź Plac Niepodległości - Pabianice Wiejska) - tram stop located at the intersection of Łaska and Szare Szeregi streets.
- Night bus line **N4B** (**Pabianice Dworzec PKP** - Stoki Skalna) - bus terminus.

== Train services ==
The station is served by the following services:

- Intercity services (IC) Wrocław Główny — Łódź — Warszawa Wschodnia
- Intercity services (IC) Białystok - Warszawa - Łódź - Ostrów Wielkopolski - Wrocław
- Intercity services (IC) Ełk - Białystok - Warszawa - Łódź - Ostrów Wielkopolski - Wrocław
- Intercity services (IC) Zgorzelec - Legnica - Wrocław - Ostrów Wielkopolski - Łódź - Warszawa
- InterRegio services (IR) Ostrów Wielkopolski — Łódź — Warszawa Główna
- InterRegio services (IR) Poznań Główny — Ostrów Wielkopolski — Łódź — Warszawa Główna
- Regiona services (PR) Łódź Kaliska — Ostrów Wielkopolski
- Regional services (PR) Łódź Kaliska — Ostrów Wielkopolski — Poznań Główny
