= Łódź Dąbrowa railway station =

Railway station in Łódź, Poland

Coordinates: 51°44′10.889″N 19°30′38.552″E

Łódź Dąbrowa
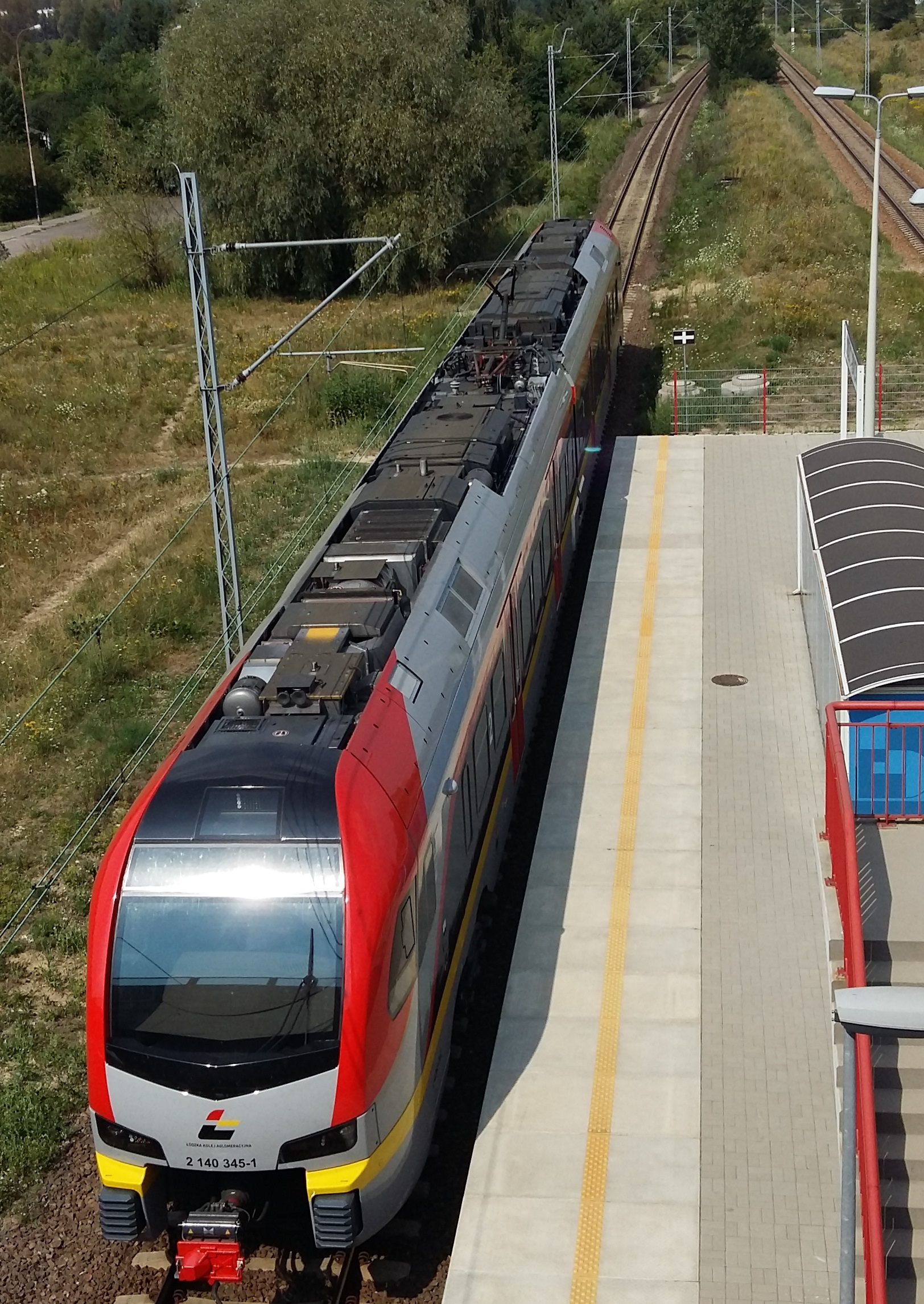
- A platform overview

General information
- Location: Łódź, Górna District; Poland
- Line: Łódź Circular Line
- Platforms: 1

Construction
- Accessible: elevators

History
- Opened: 15 December 2013

Services
Preceding station	Polregio	Following station
Łódź Chojny towards Łódź Kaliska, Ostrów Wielkopolski or Poznań Główny	IR	Łódź Widzew towards Warszawa Główna
Łódź Chojny towards Łódź Kaliska	PR	Łódź Widzew towards Skarżysko-Kamienna
Preceding station	ŁKA	Following station
Łódź Widzew Terminus	Łódź - Toruń	Łódź Chojny towards Toruń
Łódź Widzew Terminus	Łódź - Łowicz	Łódź Chojny towards Łowicz Główny
Łódź Widzew towards Łódź Fabryczna	Łódź Widzew - Łódź Kaliska - Zgierz	Łódź Chojny towards Zgierz
Łódź Widzew Terminus	Łódź - Sieradz	Łódź Chojny towards Sieradz
Łódź Widzew towards Łódź Fabryczna	Łódź - Poznań (jointly operated with Greater Poland Railways)	Łódź Chojny towards Poznań Główny
Location

The Łódź Dąbrowa is a railway complex in Polish city of Łódź, located in the Górna district, between the residential and industrial sectors of the Dąbrowa estate, on the part of circular line running between Łódź Chojny and Łódź Widzew stations. The complex consists of two parts: a cargo terminal serving the industrial facilities located in the areas of Dąbrowa, Zarzew and Widzew Wschód, and a pass-through commuter station, consisting of a single platform located under the viaducts of Dąbrowski St.

The station was planned back in the 1960s because of the construction of towerblock estate to the west of the tracks. The passenger station was meant to be built along with road viaducts, but the work was never finished. An unfinished concourse under the viaduct is the only remnant of that era.

The concept of a commuter station was reactivated in 2010 as part of the Łódź Commuter Railway project. A new platform was made, along with staircases and elevators for both road viaducts for integration with a bus stop located on them. The new station was opened on 15 December 2013.

The station is mostly served by PolRegio regional trains running from Łódź Kaliska station to Częstochowa and Skarżysko-Kamienna, and ŁKA trains from Łódź Kaliska to Łódź Widzew station. The station is also served by several PKP Intercity trains from Warsaw to Wrocław.

The station can be accessed by trams running to a nearby terminus, and buses, both terminating at and passing through the area of the station.

== Train services ==
The station is served by the following services:

- InterRegio services (IR) Łódź Kaliska — Warszawa Glowna
- InterRegio services (IR) Ostrów Wielkopolski — Łódź — Warszawa Główna
- InterRegio services (IR) Poznań Główny — Ostrów Wielkopolski — Łódź — Warszawa Główna
- Regional services (PR) Łódź Kaliska — Skarżysko-Kamienna
