= Nowe Skalmierzyce railway station =

Railway station in Greater Poland, Poland

Nowe Skalmierzyce
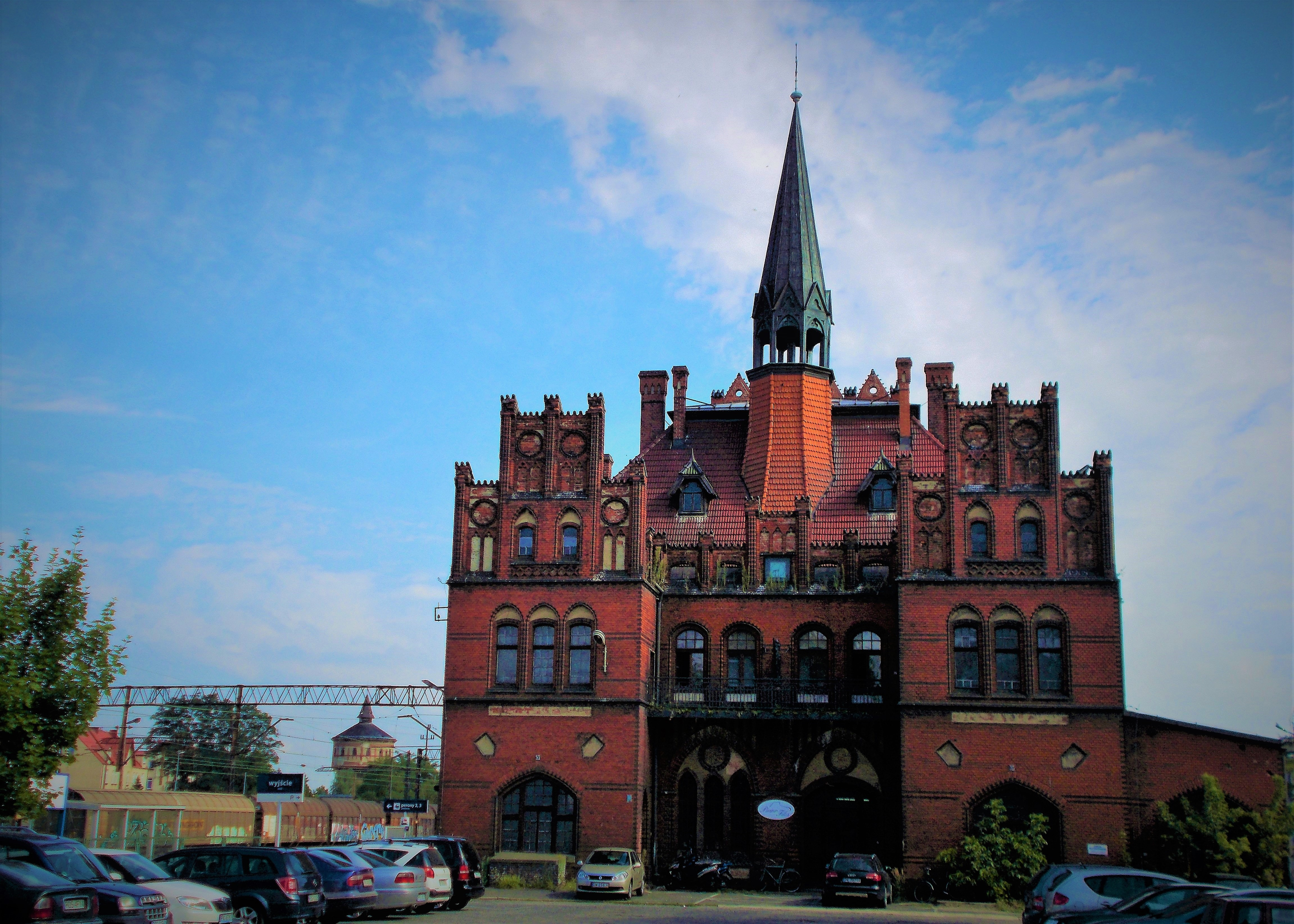
- Nowe Skalmierzyce railway station

General information
- Location: Nowe Skalmierzyce, Greater Poland Voivodeship; Poland
- Coordinates: 51.70806°N 17.99791°E
- System: Railway Station
- Operator: PKP Polskie Linie Kolejowe
- Line: 14 Łódź-Forst (Lausitz) railway
- Platforms: 3

History
- Opened: 1896

Services
Preceding station	Polregio	Following station
Ociąż towards Ostrów Wielkopolski or Poznań Główny	IR	Nowe Skalmierzyce towards Warszawa Główna
Ociąż towards Ostrów Wielkopolski or Poznań Główny	PR	Nowe Skalmierzyce towards Łódź Kaliska
Preceding station	ŁKA	Following station
Ostrów Wielkopolski towards Łódź Fabryczna	Łódź - Poznań (jointly operated with Greater Poland Railways)	Kalisz towards Poznań Główny
Preceding station	KW	Following station
Kalisz towards Poznań Główny	Poznań - Łódź (Co-operated with Łódzka Kolej Aglomeracyjna)	Ostrów Wielkopolski towards Łódź Kaliska
Kalisz towards Poznań Główny	Poznań - Kalisz	Pleszew towards Kalisz
Location
- Location within Poland

Nowe Skalmierzyce railway station is a railway station in Nowe Skalmierzyce, Greater Poland Voivodeship, Poland, located in the eastern part of the city. The station is located on the Łódź–Forst (Lausitz) railway. The train services are operated by Polregio.

== Train services ==
The station is served by the following services:

- InterRegio services (IR) Ostrów Wielkopolski — Łódź — Warszawa Główna
- InterRegio services (IR) Poznań Główny — Ostrów Wielkopolski — Łódź — Warszawa Główna
- Regiona services (PR) Łódź Kaliska — Ostrów Wielkopolski
- Regional services (PR) Łódź Kaliska — Ostrów Wielkopolski — Poznań Główny
