= Zduńska Wola railway station =

Railway station in Poland

Coordinates: 51°36′41″N 18°56′48″E

Zduńska Wola
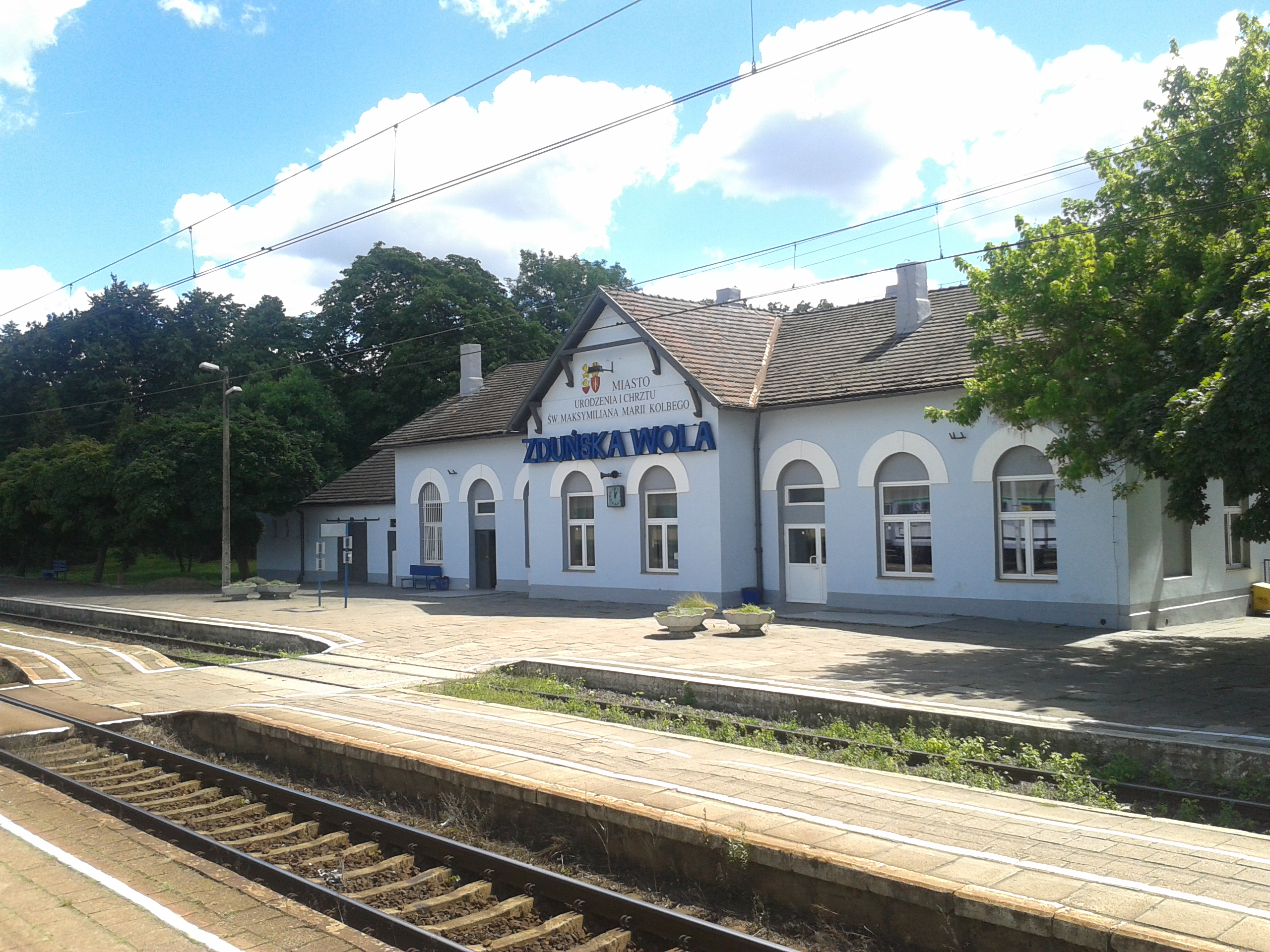

General information
- Location: Zduńska Wola, Łódź Voivodeship, Poland
- Lines: 14 Łódź-Forst (Lausitz) railway; 739 to Karsznice station; 810 to Szadek
- Platforms: 2

History
- Opened: 1902
- Rebuilt: 2018-2020
- Electrified: 1965

Services
Preceding station	PKP Intercity	Following station
Łask towards Warszawa Wschodnia	IC Via Łódź	Sieradz towards Wrocław Główny
Łask towards Białystok	IC Via Łódź	Sieradz towards Wrocław Główny
Łask towards Ełk	IC	Sieradz towards Wrocław Główny
Łask towards Warszawa Wschodnia	IC	Sieradz towards Zgorzelec
Preceding station	Polregio	Following station
Męcka Wola towards Ostrów Wielkopolski or Poznań Główny	IR	Borszewice towards Warszawa Główna
Męcka Wola towards Ostrów Wielkopolski or Poznań Główny	PR	Borszewice towards Łódź Kaliska
Preceding station	ŁKA	Following station
Borszewice towards Łódź Fabryczna	Łódź - Poznań (jointly operated with Greater Poland Railways)	Męcka Wola towards Poznań Główny
Preceding station	KW	Following station
Męcka Wola towards Poznań Główny	Poznań - Łódź (Co-operated with Łódzka Kolej Aglomeracyjna)	Borszewice towards Łódź Kaliska
Location

Zduńska Wola is the main railway station for the town of Zduńska Wola, Łódź Voivodeship. Initially built in early 1900s to serve Warsaw-Kalisz Railway, it is currently an important interchange, serving trains running on Coal Trunk Railway from Karsznice station toward Sieradz and Kalisz.

For passenger service, it serves as stopping point for PKP Intercity trains running between Wrocław and Warsaw, PolRegio routes from Łódź to Poznań and Wrocław, and ŁKA services to Sieradz. In 2015 the station served as terminus for a commuter trains to Karsznice station.

== Train services ==
The station is served by the following services:

- Intercity services (IC) Wrocław Główny — Łódź — Warszawa Wschodnia
- Intercity services (IC) Białystok - Warszawa - Łódź - Ostrów Wielkopolski - Wrocław
- Intercity services (IC) Ełk - Białystok - Warszawa - Łódź - Ostrów Wielkopolski - Wrocław
- Intercity services (IC) Zgorzelec - Legnica - Wrocław - Ostrów Wielkopolski - Łódź - Warszawa
- InterRegio services (IR) Ostrów Wielkopolski — Łódź — Warszawa Główna
- InterRegio services (IR) Poznań Główny — Ostrów Wielkopolski — Łódź — Warszawa Główna
- Regiona services (PR) Łódź Kaliska — Ostrów Wielkopolski
- Regional services (PR) Łódź Kaliska — Ostrów Wielkopolski — Poznań Główny
