= Kalisz railway station =

Railway station in Kalisz, Poland

Kalisz
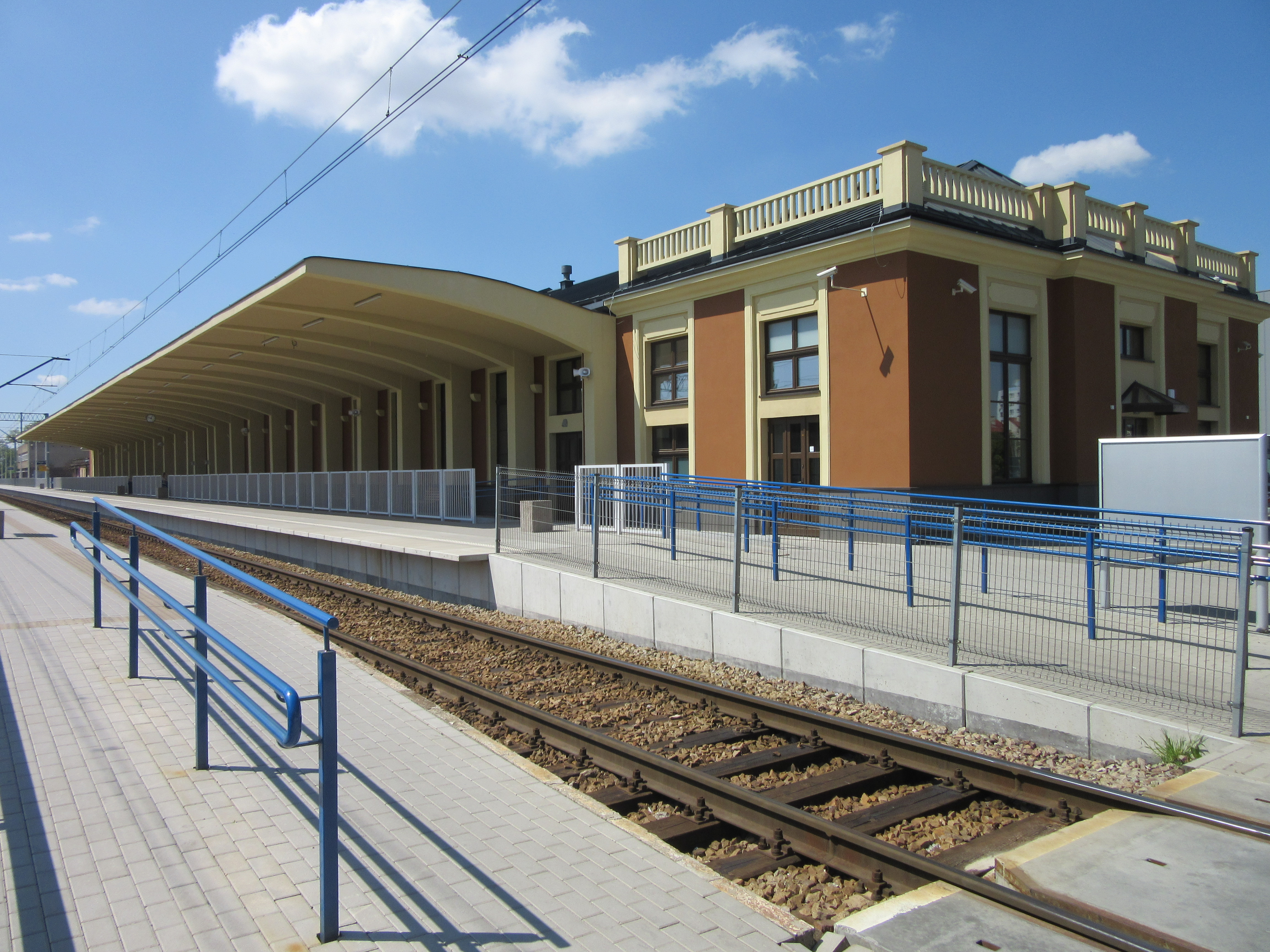
- Kalisz railway station

General information
- Location: Kalisz, Greater Poland Voivodeship; Poland
- Coordinates: 51°44′34″N 18°04′18″E
- System: Railway Station
- Operator: PKP Polskie Linie Kolejowe
- Line: 14 Łódź-Forst (Lausitz) railway
- Platforms: 2

History
- Opened: 15 November 1902; 123 years ago

Services
Preceding station	PKP Intercity	Following station
Sieradz towards Warszawa Wschodnia	IC Via Łódź	Ostrów Wielkopolski towards Wrocław Główny
Sieradz towards Białystok	IC Via Łódź	Ostrów Wielkopolski towards Wrocław Główny
Sieradz towards Ełk	IC	Ostrów Wielkopolski towards Wrocław Główny
Sieradz towards Warszawa Wschodnia	IC	Ostrów Wielkopolski towards Zgorzelec
Preceding station	Polregio	Following station
Kalisz Szczypiorno towards Ostrów Wielkopolski or Poznań Główny	IR	Kalisz Winiary towards Warszawa Główna
Kalisz Szczypiorno towards Ostrów Wielkopolski or Poznań Główny	PR	Kalisz Winiary towards Łódź Kaliska
Preceding station	ŁKA	Following station
Opatówek towards Łódź Fabryczna	Łódź - Poznań (jointly operated with Greater Poland Railways)	Nowe Skalmierzyce towards Poznań Główny
Preceding station	KW	Following station
Nowe Skalmierzyce towards Poznań Główny	Poznań - Łódź (Co-operated with Łódzka Kolej Aglomeracyjna)	Opatówek towards Łódź Kaliska
Nowe Skalmierzyce towards Poznań Główny	Poznań - Kalisz	Terminus
Location
- Location within Poland

Kalisz railway station is a railway station in Kalisz, in the Greater Poland Voivodeship, Poland. The station opened in 1902 and is located on the Łódź–Forst (Lausitz) railway. The train services are operated by PKP and Polregio.

== History ==
The station was built in 1902 as the final stop of the Warsaw–Kalisz Railway. In 1906, a line was added to Nowe Skalmierzyce, the border crossing between the Russian-controlled Vistula Land and the German Empire. In the past numerous international trains departed from Kalisz, to destinations such as Moscow, Baku, Prague, Frankfurt, Dresden, Paris, Ostend and Calais. Even in the late twentieth century Kalisz can be reached abroad. The last international train services was "Bohemia" (Warsaw - Wroclaw - Pardubice - Prague).

== Modernisation ==
The station building was to be upgraded before the Euro 2012. However, due to contract issues and delays the renovations were not completed until November 2015. The modernised station was opened on 27 November 2015.

== Train services ==
The station is served by the following service(s):

- Intercity services (IC) Wrocław Główny — Łódź — Warszawa Wschodnia
- Intercity services (IC) Białystok - Warszawa - Łódź - Ostrów Wielkopolski - Wrocław
- Intercity services (IC) Ełk - Białystok - Warszawa - Łódź - Ostrów Wielkopolski - Wrocław
- Intercity services (IC) Zgorzelec - Legnica - Wrocław - Ostrów Wielkopolski - Łódź - Warszawa
- Intercity services Jelenia Gora - Wroclaw - Ostrow Wielkopolski - Kalisz - Lodz - Warsaw - Lublin/Bialystok* InterRegio services (IR) Ostrów Wielkopolski — Łódź — Warszawa Główna
- InterRegio services (IR) Poznań Główny — Ostrów Wielkopolski — Łódź — Warszawa Główna
- Regiona services (PR) Łódź Kaliska — Ostrów Wielkopolski
- Regional services (PR) Łódź Kaliska — Ostrów Wielkopolski — Poznań Główny

== Bus services ==
- A
- 9
