= Pleszew railway station =

Railway station in Wielkopolska, Poland

Pleszew
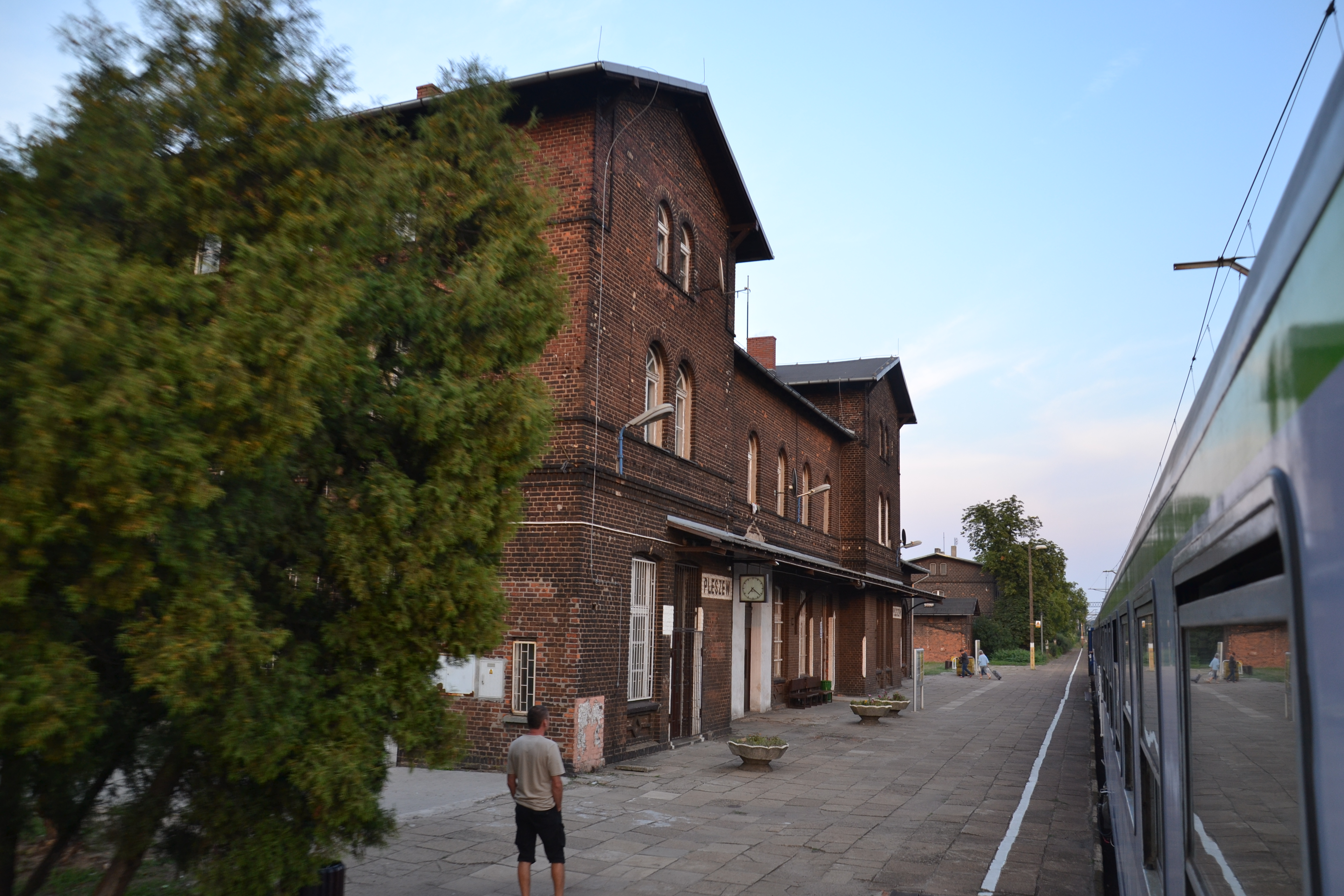
- Pleszew railway station

General information
- Location: Kowalew, Greater Poland Voivodeship (4km West of Centre of Pleszew); Poland
- Coordinates: 51.892228°N 17.732794°E
- System: Railway Station
- Operator: PKP Polskie Linie Kolejowe
- Line: 272 Kluczbork–Poznań railway
- Platforms: 3

History
- Opened: 1875

Services
Preceding station	PKP Intercity	Following station
Ostrów Wielkopolski towards Kraków Główny	IC	Jarocin towards Poznań Główny
Ostrów Wielkopolski towards Kraków Główny	TLK	Jarocin towards Poznań Główny
Preceding station	Polregio	Following station
Kotlin towards Poznań Główny	IR	Taczanów towards Warszawa Główna
Kotlin towards Poznań Główny	PR	Taczanów towards Łódź Kaliska
Preceding station	ŁKA	Following station
Ostrów Wielkopolski towards Łódź Fabryczna	Łódź - Poznań (jointly operated with Greater Poland Railways)	Jarocin towards Poznań Główny
Preceding station	KW	Following station
Kotlin towards Poznań Główny	Poznań - Odolanów	Taczanów towards Odolanów
Kotlin towards Poznań Główny	Poznań - Kępno	Taczanów towards Kępno
Jarocin towards Poznań Główny	Poznań - Łódź (Co-operated with Łódzka Kolej Aglomeracyjna)	Ostrów Wielkopolski towards Łódź Kaliska
Location
- Location within Poland

Pleszew railway station is a railway station in Kowalew, Greater Poland Voivodeship, Poland, 4 km West of Centre of Pleszew. The station is located on the Kluczbork–Poznań railway. The train services are operated by PKP Intercity, Greater Poland Railways and Polregio .

== Train services ==
The station is served by the following service(s):

- Intercity services (IC) Poznań - Ostrów Wielkopolski - Kępno - Lubliniec - Częstochowa - Kraków
- Intercity services (TLK) Poznań - Ostrów Wielkopolski - Kępno - Lubliniec - Częstochowa - Kraków
- InterRegio services (IR) Poznań Główny — Ostrów Wielkopolski — Łódź — Warszawa Główna
- Regional services (PR) Łódź Kaliska — Ostrów Wielkopolski — Poznań Główny
