= Łask railway station =

Railway station in Łask, Poland

Łask
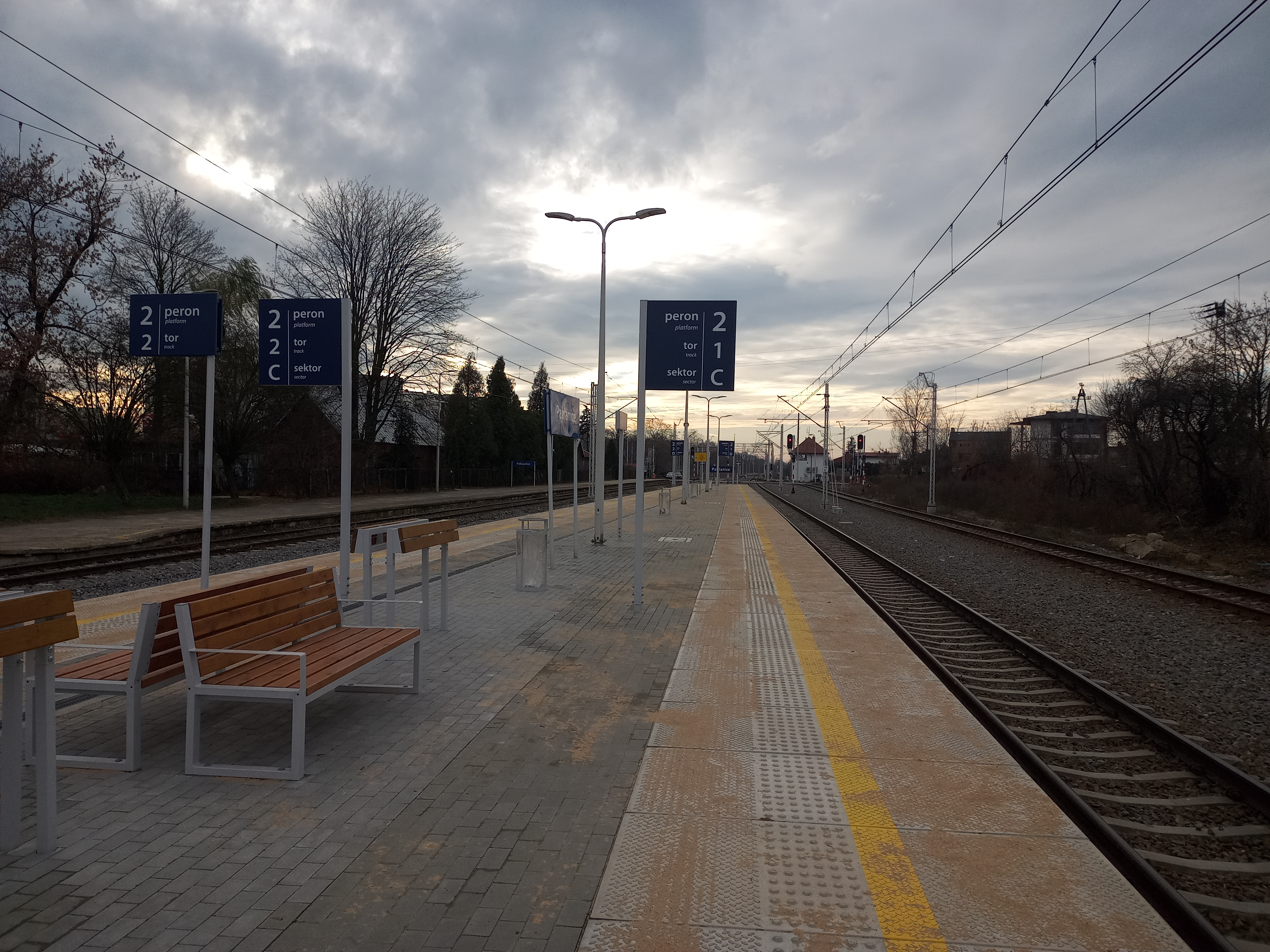
- Łask railway station platforms

General information
- Location: Łask, Łódź Voivodeship; Poland
- Coordinates: 51.6035°N 19.1120°E
- Line: 14 Łódź-Forst (Lausitz) railway
- Platforms: 2
- Tracks: 6

History
- Opened: 1902
- Rebuilt: 2018-2020
- Electrified: 1965

Services
Preceding station	PKP Intercity	Following station
Pabianice towards Warszawa Wschodnia	IC Via Łódź	Zduńska Wola towards Wrocław Główny
Pabianice towards Białystok	IC Via Łódź	Zduńska Wola towards Wrocław Główny
Pabianice towards Ełk	IC	Zduńska Wola towards Wrocław Główny
Pabianice towards Warszawa Wschodnia	IC	Zduńska Wola towards Zgorzelec
Preceding station	Polregio	Following station
Borszewice towards Ostrów Wielkopolski or Poznań Główny	IR	Kolumna towards Warszawa Główna
Borszewice towards Ostrów Wielkopolski or Poznań Główny	PR	Kolumna towards Łódź Kaliska
Preceding station	ŁKA	Following station
Kolumna towards Łódź Widzew	Łódź - Sieradz	Borszewice towards Sieradz
Kolumna towards Łódź Fabryczna	Łódź - Poznań (jointly operated with Greater Poland Railways)	Zduńska Wola towards Poznań Główny
Preceding station	KW	Following station
Zduńska Wola towards Poznań Główny	Poznań - Łódź (Co-operated with Łódzka Kolej Aglomeracyjna)	Kolumna towards Łódź Kaliska
Location

Łask railway station is located on the outskirts of the Polish town of Łask, Łódź Voivodeship. It serves mostly regional traffic between Łódź and Sieradz, although it is also a stopping point for PKP Intercity services between Warsaw and Wrocław. The station is not classified by PKP, as it is officially owned by local municipal authorities.

== Characteristics ==
The station was built in the early 1900s and opened in 1902 as part of the Warsaw-Kalisz Railway. The building was made in a characteristic Renaissance Revival style, typical for smaller stations of this line, like those in Pabianice and Zduńska Wola. Currently the main building of the station is closed for passengers - doorways and windows are shut down with wooden planks, and its condition deteriorates. Passengers have to purchase their tickets from train conductors or ticket machines.

Aside the main line from Łódź to Kalisz, the station served a branch line leading to Zelów. Currently the line is shortened and repurposed as a branch line leading to an air force base located southeast of the station.

In the years 2018-2020 the station has been undergoing a major reconstruction of track and platform layout due to refurbishment works on the railway line between Łódź and Zduńska Wola. This resulted in creation of an island platform located in the middle of the station, with single-level crossing as the access way.

== Train services ==
The station is served by the following services:

- Intercity services (IC) Wrocław Główny — Łódź — Warszawa Wschodnia
- Intercity services (IC) Białystok - Warszawa - Łódź - Ostrów Wielkopolski - Wrocław
- Intercity services (IC) Ełk - Białystok - Warszawa - Łódź - Ostrów Wielkopolski - Wrocław
- Intercity services (IC) Zgorzelec - Legnica - Wrocław - Ostrów Wielkopolski - Łódź - Warszawa
- InterRegio services (IR) Ostrów Wielkopolski — Łódź — Warszawa Główna
- InterRegio services (IR) Poznań Główny — Ostrów Wielkopolski — Łódź — Warszawa Główna
- Regiona services (PR) Łódź Kaliska — Ostrów Wielkopolski
- Regional services (PR) Łódź Kaliska — Ostrów Wielkopolski — Poznań Główny
