= Warsaw–Kalisz Railway =

Railway line in Poland

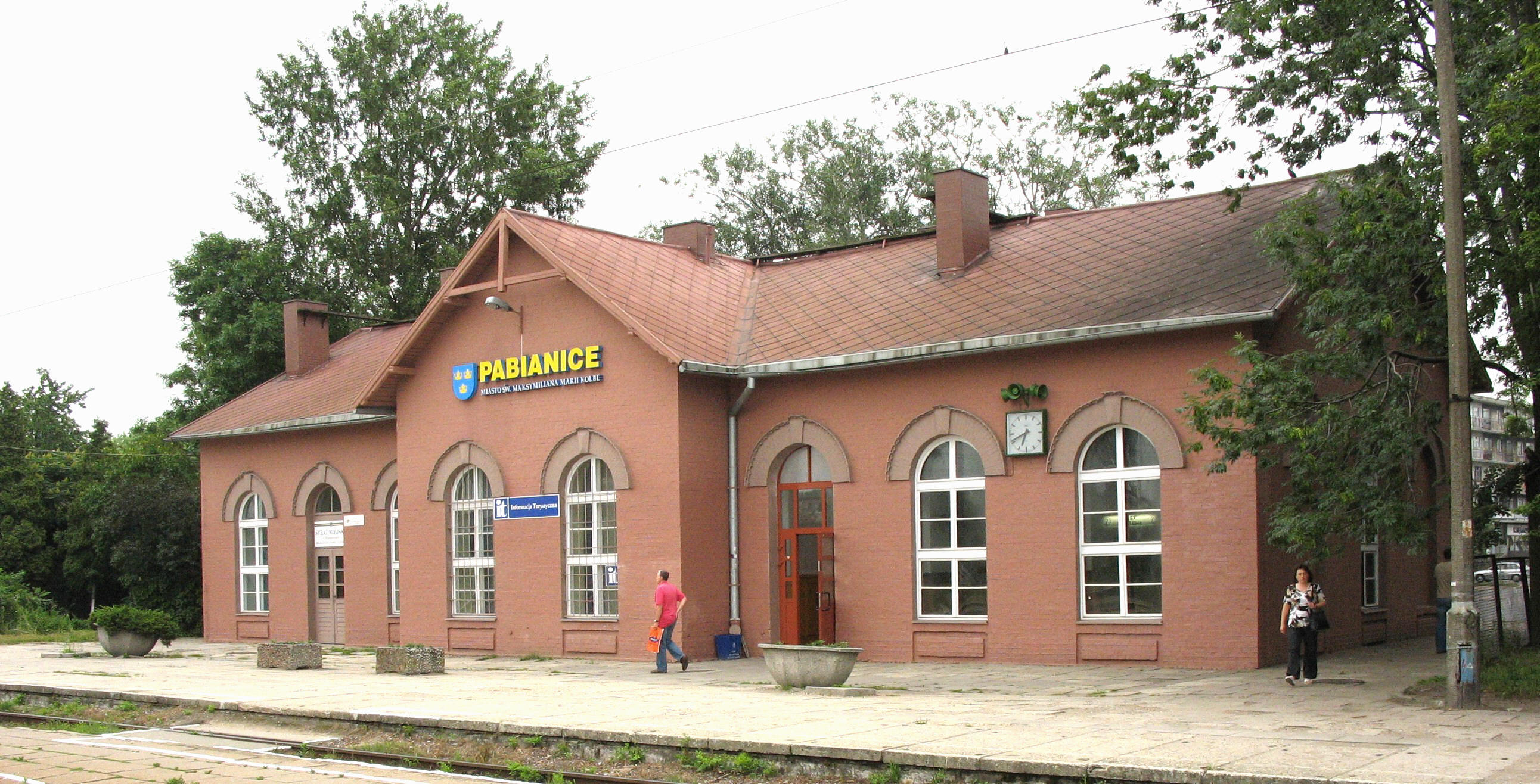
Station in Pabianice, located on the Warsaw–Kalisz Railway

The Warsaw–Kalisz Railway (Polish: Kolej Warszawsko-Kaliska), also called Kalisz Railway is a railway in Poland connecting Warsaw and Kalisz. It was built between 1900 - 1902 by the Society of the Warsaw–Vienna railway in the Russian-controlled Congress Poland. The line was opened on 15 November 1902 connecting the railway junction in Warsaw with Kalisz near the border of the Russian Empire and German Empire. Unlike the earlier Warsaw–Vienna railway the line to Kalisz was built to the Russian broad gauge 1,524 mm (5 ft) to facilitate Russian military transports and limit the potential for interoperability with the European rail network.

In 1906, the Warsaw - Kalisz Railway was connected with the German railways, through a newly constructed dual-gauge line Kalisz - Nowe Skalmierzyce (a village which served as a border checkpoint). In 1910, German government built another line, from Oleśnica, via Odolanów, to Ostrów Wielkopolski, which shortened the rail distance between Wrocław and Kalisz.

The line was nationalized by the Imperial Russian government in 1912. In 1914 following the start of World War I it was converted to standard gauge by the advancing German forces. Two years later, German occupational authorities added a second track along most of route. During the war large parts of the lines infrastructure were destroyed, including two stations Kalisz and Warszawa Kaliska, the second wasn't rebuilt as retaining standard gauge eliminated the need for a separate station.

In 1918, the line was taken over by the newly independent Second Polish Republic, and until 1922, it served as the main connection between Warsaw and Poznań. However, its importance decreased after construction of a shorter Warsaw - Poznań route, via Kutno, and Konin. Currently, the line is used mostly by trains connecting Łódź and Wrocław.

Today the segment of the line from the Warszawa Zachodnia in Warsaw to Łowicz is part of the PKP line 3 of the Polish National Railways PKP Polskie Linie Kolejowe, which is one of Poland's major trunk lines, connecting Warsaw with Poznań and further to the border with Germany. A segment from Łowicz to Łódź Kaliska station in Łódź is designated as PKP line 15 and the segment from Łódź to Kalisz is part of PKP line 14 which continues to Leszno and the German border.

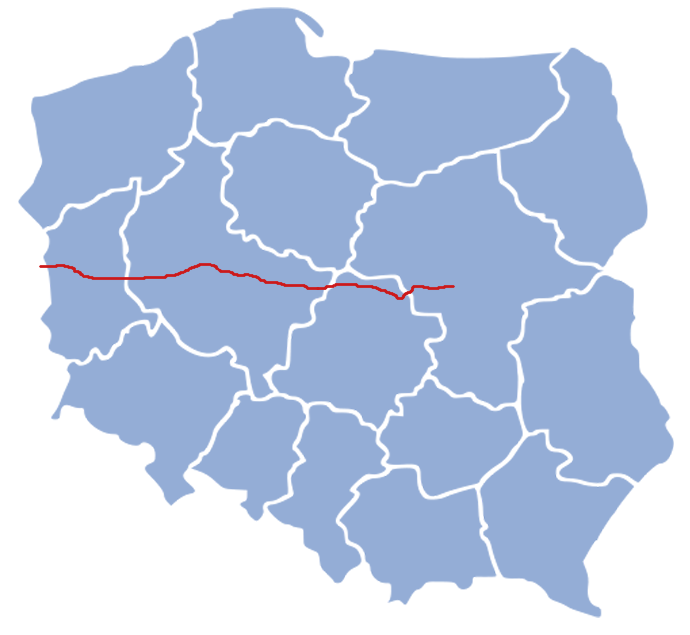
PKP line 3

PKP line 14

PKP line 15

== Route ==
Warsaw Kaliska - Błonie - Sochaczew - Łowicz - Głowno - Stryków - Zgierz - Łódź Kaliska - Pabianice - Łask - Zduńska Wola - Sieradz - Błaszki - Opatówek - Kalisz.

== See also ==
- History of rail transport in Poland
