= Kowalew, Greater Poland Voivodeship =

Kowalew
- Village
- Location within Poland
- Coordinates: 51°53′24″N 17°44′10″E
- Country: Poland
- Voivodeship: Greater Poland
- County: Pleszew
- Gmina: Pleszew
- Population (2022): 1,592

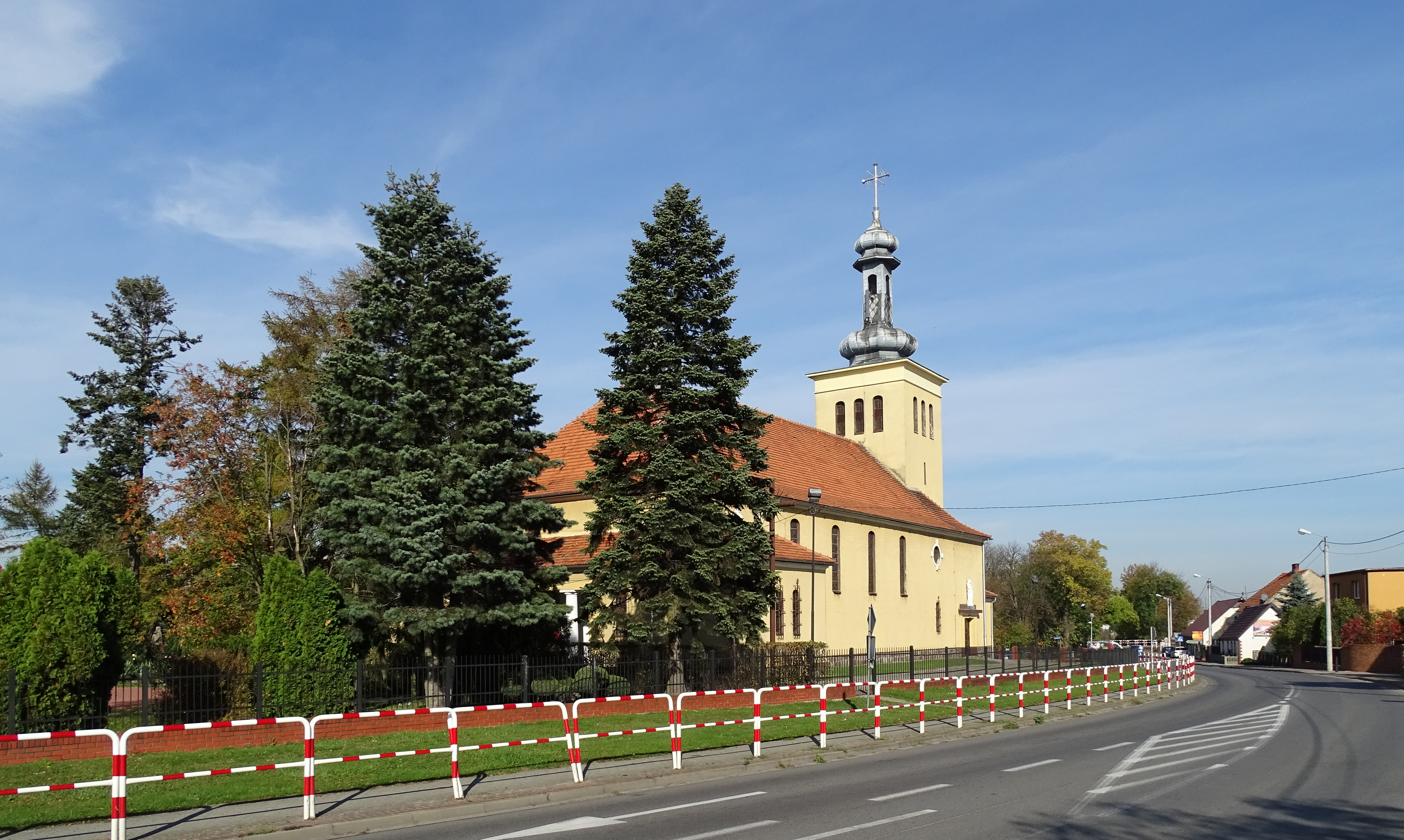
Parish church.

Kowalew [kɔˈvalɛf] is a village in the administrative district of Gmina Pleszew, within Pleszew County, Greater Poland Voivodeship, in west-central Poland.
