= Block post =

Type of signal box in railway signalling

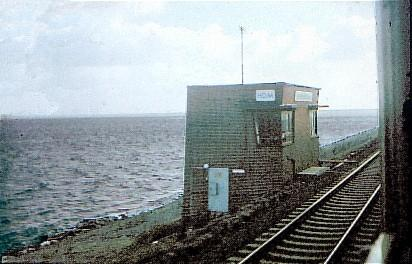
Block post, HDM, in the centre of the Hindenburgdamm (1978)

A block post in railway signalling is the signal box at one end of a block section.

== German practice ==
In Germany, block posts are known as Blockstellen (abbreviation: Bk) and are defined as railway facilities on the open line that mark the end of a block section, as part of a block system. They usually have a home signal in each direction and on each running line. They are mainly found where the distance between two railway stations is greater than average.

In the early years of the railway, block posts were local signal boxes staffed with block post keepers. Today there are only a few of these classic, railway staff-operated block posts. Their function has been largely superseded by equipment that forms part of an automatic block signalling (Selbsttätiger Streckenblock or Sbk) system or by a central block post in a station signal box at one end of the section between two stations.

Block posts are described in the German railway regulations, the Eisenbahn-Bau- und Betriebsordnung or EBO, at § 4 sub-paragraph 4.

== See also ==
- Automatic Block Signal
- Centralised control
- Block signalling
- Signalling block systems
- Token (railway signalling)
