= Sieradz railway station =

Railway station in Sieradz, Poland

Coordinates: 51°35′53″N 18°42′54″E

Sieradz
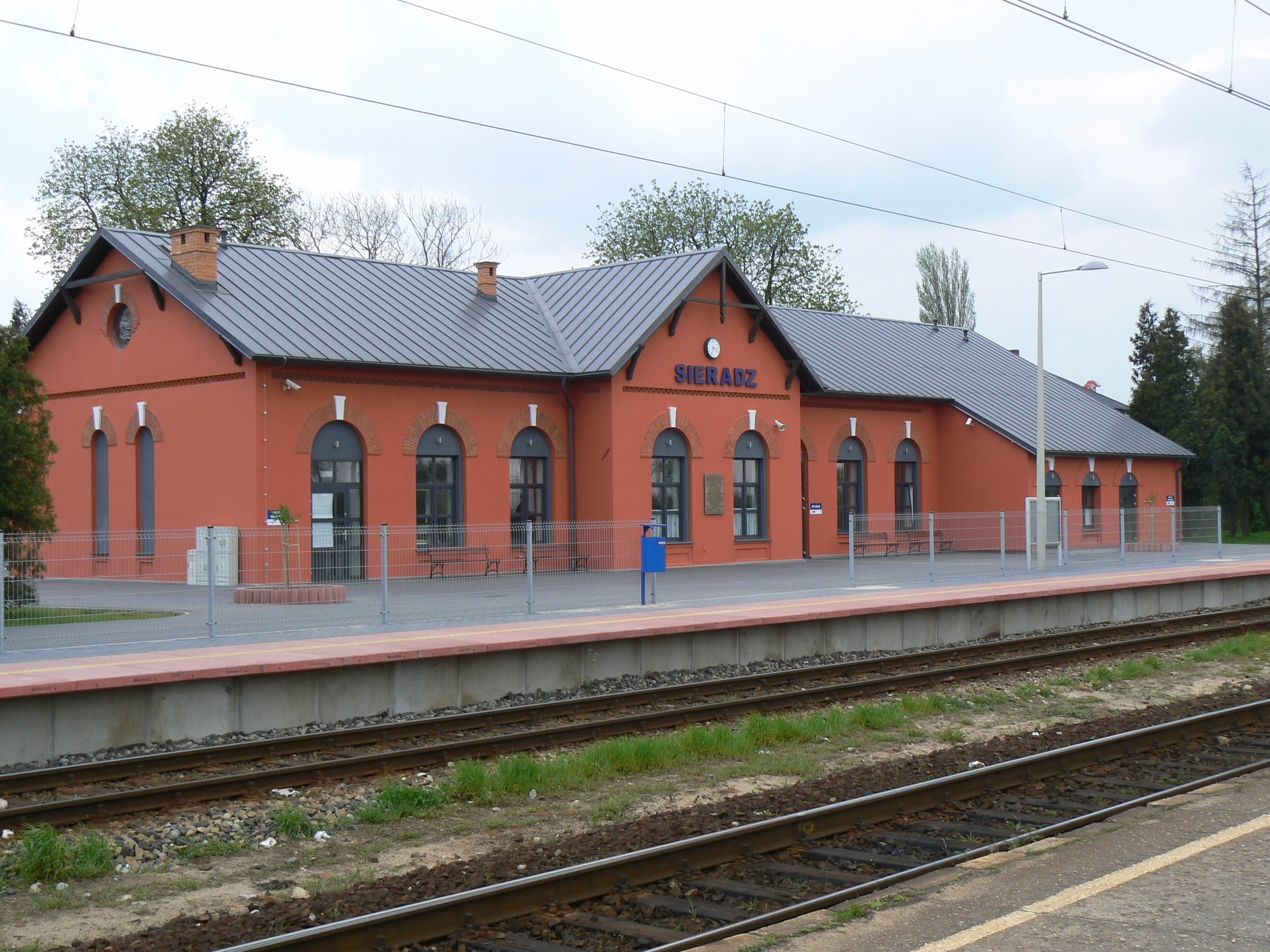
- Station's building

General information
- Location: Sieradz, Łódź Voivodeship; Poland
- System: Regional station
- Line: 14 Łódź-Forst (Lausitz) railway
- Platforms: 2

History
- Opened: 1902

Services
Preceding station	PKP Intercity	Following station
Zduńska Wola towards Warszawa Wschodnia	IC Via Łódź	Kalisz towards Wrocław Główny
Zduńska Wola towards Białystok	IC Via Łódź	Kalisz towards Wrocław Główny
Zduńska Wola towards Ełk	IC	Kalisz towards Wrocław Główny
Zduńska Wola towards Warszawa Wschodnia	IC	Kalisz towards Zgorzelec
Preceding station	Polregio	Following station
Sędzice towards Ostrów Wielkopolski or Poznań Główny	IR	Sieradz Warta towards Warszawa Główna
Sędzice towards Ostrów Wielkopolski or Poznań Główny	PR	Sieradz Warta towards Łódź Kaliska
Preceding station	ŁKA	Following station
Sieradz Warta towards Łódź Widzew	Łódź - Sieradz	Terminus
Łask towards Łódź Fabryczna	Łódź - Poznań (jointly operated with Greater Poland Railways)	Błaszki towards Poznań Główny
Preceding station	KW	Following station
Opatówek towards Poznań Główny	Poznań - Łódź (Co-operated with Łódzka Kolej Aglomeracyjna)	Łask towards Łódź Kaliska
Location

Sieradz is a railway station located in the Polish town of Sieradz, in Łódź Voivodeship. It is classified by PKP as a regional station. The station serves mainly regional services between Łódź and Poznań, as well as PKP Intercity trains running between Warsaw and Wrocław. It is also a terminus for ŁKA services running from Łódź Kaliska station.

The station was opened in 1902, along with other stations of the Warsaw-Kalisz Railway. The architectural style of the main building is similar to the stations in Pabianice, Łask and Zduńska Wola. Unlike those, the building is asymmetrical. However, the station is the only existing one between Łódź and Kalisz that still uses mechanical semaphore signals instead of colour light signals used on other stations.

== Train services ==
The station is served by the following services:

- Intercity services (IC) Wrocław Główny — Łódź — Warszawa Wschodnia
- Intercity services (IC) Białystok - Warszawa - Łódź - Ostrów Wielkopolski - Wrocław
- Intercity services (IC) Ełk - Białystok - Warszawa - Łódź - Ostrów Wielkopolski - Wrocław
- Intercity services (IC) Zgorzelec - Legnica - Wrocław - Ostrów Wielkopolski - Łódź - Warszawa
- InterRegio services (IR) Ostrów Wielkopolski — Łódź — Warszawa Główna
- InterRegio services (IR) Poznań Główny — Ostrów Wielkopolski — Łódź — Warszawa Główna
- Regiona services (PR) Łódź Kaliska — Ostrów Wielkopolski
- Regional services (PR) Łódź Kaliska — Ostrów Wielkopolski — Poznań Główny
