= Ostrów Wielkopolski railway station =

Railway station in Greater Poland, Poland

Ostrów Wielkopolski
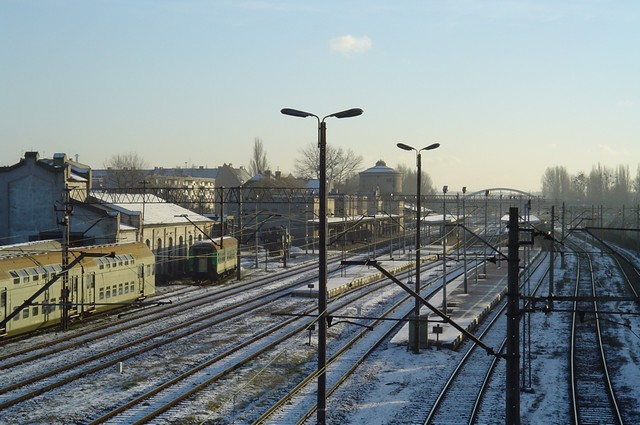
- Ostrów Wielkopolski railway station

General information
- Location: Ostrów Wielkopolski, Greater Poland Voivodeship; Poland
- Operator: PKP Polskie Linie Kolejowe
- Lines: Ostrowo (1875–1919); Ostrów (1919–1921); Ostrów Wielkopolski (1921–1939); Ostrowo (1939–1945)
- Platforms: 5

History
- Opened: 10 December 1875
- Rebuilt: 1966
- Former names: Łódź–Tuplice railway; Kluczbork–Poznań railway; Ostrów Wielkopolski–Grabowno Wielkie railway
Location
- Location within Poland Location within Greater Poland Voivodeship

Ostrów Wielkopolski is a railway station in the city of Ostrów Wielkopolski, Greater Poland Voivodeship in western Poland.

== History ==
The station opened as Ostrowo on 10 December 1875. After World War I, the area came under Polish administration. As a result, the station was taken over by Polish State Railways, and was renamed to Ostrów in 1919 and later to Ostrów Wielkopolski for designation in 1921. During the German occupation of Poland, the station was briefly called Ostrowo, the modern name returned after World War II.

== Train services ==
The station is served by the following services:

- Intercity services (IC) Wrocław Główny — Łódź — Warszawa Wschodnia
- Intercity services (IC) Białystok - Warszawa - Łódź - Ostrów Wielkopolski - Wrocław
- Intercity services (IC) Ełk - Białystok - Warszawa - Łódź - Ostrów Wielkopolski - Wrocław
- Intercity services (IC) Zgorzelec - Legnica - Wrocław - Ostrów Wielkopolski - Łódź - Warszawa
- Intercity services (IC) Poznań - Ostrów Wielkopolski - Kępno - Lubliniec - Częstochowa - Kraków
- Intercity services (TLK) Poznań - Ostrów Wielkopolski - Kępno - Lubliniec - Częstochowa - Kraków
- InterRegio services (IR) Ostrów Wielkopolski — Łódź — Warszawa Główna
- InterRegio services (IR) Poznań Główny — Ostrów Wielkopolski — Łódź — Warszawa Główna
- Regiona services (PR) Łódź Kaliska — Ostrów Wielkopolski
- Regional services (PR) Łódź Kaliska — Ostrów Wielkopolski — Poznań Główny
- Regional services (PR) Wrocław - Oleśnica - Ostrów Wielkopolski
- Regional services (PR) Ostrów Wielkopolski — Kępno
- Regional services (PR) Ostrów Wielkopolski — Kępno — Kluczbork

| Preceding station | PKP Intercity | Following station |
|---|---|---|
| Ostrzeszów towards Kraków Główny | IC | Pleszew towards Poznań Główny |
| Kalisz towards Warszawa Wschodnia | IC Via Łódź | Twardogóra towards Wrocław Główny |
| Kalisz towards Białystok | IC Via Łódź | Krotoszyn towards Wrocław Główny |
| Kalisz towards Ełk | IC | Twardogóra towards Wrocław Główny |
| Kalisz towards Warszawa Wschodnia | IC | Krotoszyn towards Zgorzelec |
| Ostrzeszów towards Kraków Główny | TLK | Pleszew towards Poznań Główny |
| Preceding station | Polregio | Following station |
| Terminus | IR | Czekanów towards Warszawa Główna |
| Biniew towards Poznań Główny | IR | Czekanów towards Warszawa Główna |
| Terminus | PR | Czekanów towards Łódź Kaliska |
| Biniew towards Poznań Główny | PR | Czekanów towards Łódź Kaliska |
| Janków Przygodzki towards Kępno or Kluczbork | PR | Terminus |
| Topola-Osiedle towards Wrocław Główny | PR | Terminus |
| Preceding station | ŁKA | Following station |
| Nowe Skalmierzyce towards Łódź Fabryczna | Łódź - Poznań (jointly operated with Greater Poland Railways) | Pleszew towards Poznań Główny |
| Preceding station | KW | Following station |
| Biniew towards Poznań Główny | Poznań - Odolanów | Topola-Osiedle towards Odolanów |
| Biniew towards Poznań Główny | Poznań - Kępno | Janków Przygodzki towards Kępno |
| Pleszew towards Poznań Główny | Poznań - Łódź (Co-operated with Łódzka Kolej Aglomeracyjna) | Nowe Skalmierzyce towards Łódź Kaliska |
| Ostrów Wielkopolski Gorzyce towards Leszno | Leszno - Ostrów Wlkp. | Terminus |
