= Łódź Kaliska railway station =

Railway station in Poland

Coordinates: 51°45′29″N 19°25′47″E

Łódź Kaliska
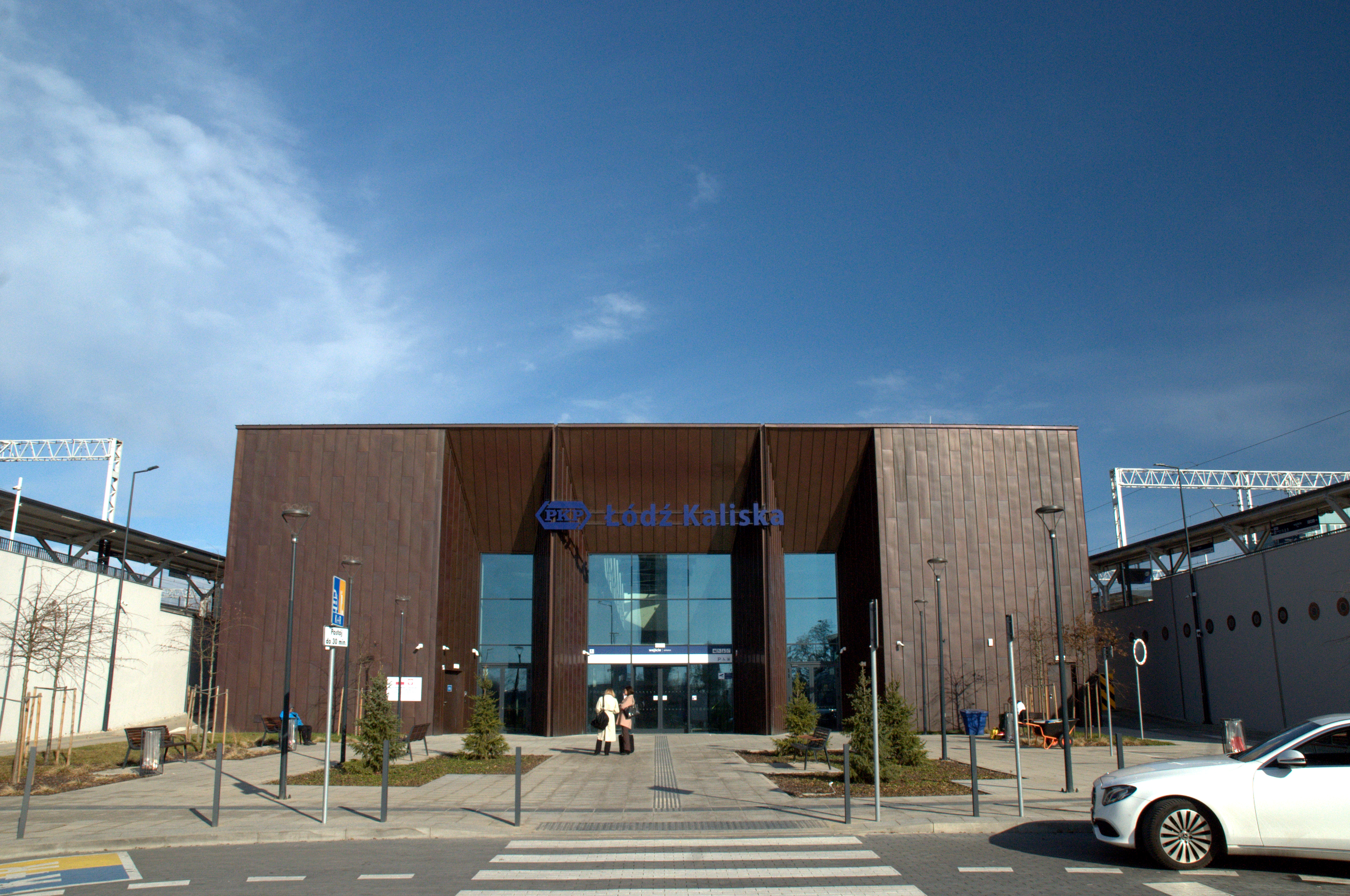
- New station building in March 2026

General information
- Location: Łódź, Poland
- Owner: Polish State Railways
- Lines: Łódź–Tuplice railway (formerly Warsaw–Kalisz Railway); Łódź Circular Line: Łódź–Bednary; Łódź–Dębica; Łódź Cross-City Line (planned)
- Platforms: 5
- Tracks: 12

History
- Opened: 1902
- Rebuilt: 1994, 2020-ongoing
- Electrified: 1965
- Former names: Lodz Kalischer Bf (1915-1918); Litzmannstadt Hbf (1940-1945)

Passengers
- 2018: 6300

Services
Preceding station	PKP Intercity	Following station
Łódź Żabieniec towards Gdynia Główna	IC	Łódź Widzew towards Łódź Fabryczna or Bielsko-Biała Główna
Łódź Widzew towards Katowice	TLK	Łódź Żabieniec towards Gdynia Główna
Preceding station	Polregio	Following station
Terminus	IR	Łódź Dąbrowa towards Warszawa Główna
Łódź Retkinia towards Ostrów Wielkopolski or Poznań Główny	IR	Łódź Dąbrowa towards Warszawa Główna
Łódź Retkinia towards Ostrów Wielkopolski or Poznań Główny	PR	Terminus
Terminus	PR	Łódź Pabianicka towards Częstochowa
Terminus	PR	Łódź Pabianicka towards Skarżysko-Kamienna
Preceding station	ŁKA	Following station
Łódź Pabianicka towards Łódź Widzew	Łódź - Toruń	Łódź Żabieniec towards Toruń
Łódź Pabianicka towards Łódź Widzew	Łódź - Łowicz	Łódź Żabieniec towards Łowicz Główny
Łódź Pabianicka towards Łódź Fabryczna	Łódź Widzew - Łódź Kaliska - Zgierz	Łódź Żabieniec towards Zgierz
Łódź Pabianicka towards Łódź Widzew	Łódź - Sieradz	Łódź Retkinia towards Sieradz
Łódź Pabianicka towards Łódź Fabryczna	Łódź - Poznań (jointly operated with Greater Poland Railways)	Łódź Retkinia towards Poznań Główny
Preceding station	KW	Following station
Łódź Retkinia towards Poznań Główny	Poznań - Łódź (Co-operated with Łódzka Kolej Aglomeracyjna)	Terminus
Location

Łódź Kaliska is one of the two main railway stations in the central Polish city of Łódź. It is located west of the center of the city, in the district of Polesie, and it consists of six platforms. The first complex of the station, designed by Polish architect Czesław Domaniewski, was built in 1902 in the style of Art Nouveau. Inside, there were several Art Nouveau elements, including crystal windows in doors, as well as brass fittings. The station, built from 1900 to 1902, served the Warsaw–Kalisz Railway.

On 28 September 1946 a major rail accident occurred at the station, in which 21 people died. In 1994, a brand new complex of the Łódź Kaliska station was completed, and has been in use since then. The station provides connections to all major cities of Poland, including Warsaw, Kraków, Bydgoszcz, Katowice, Poznań, Wrocław, Szczecin, and Gdańsk, as well as Prague in the Czech Republic. The station is the terminus of Łódź Agglomeration Railway (Łódź Commuter Railway), which serves towns in the Łódź region.

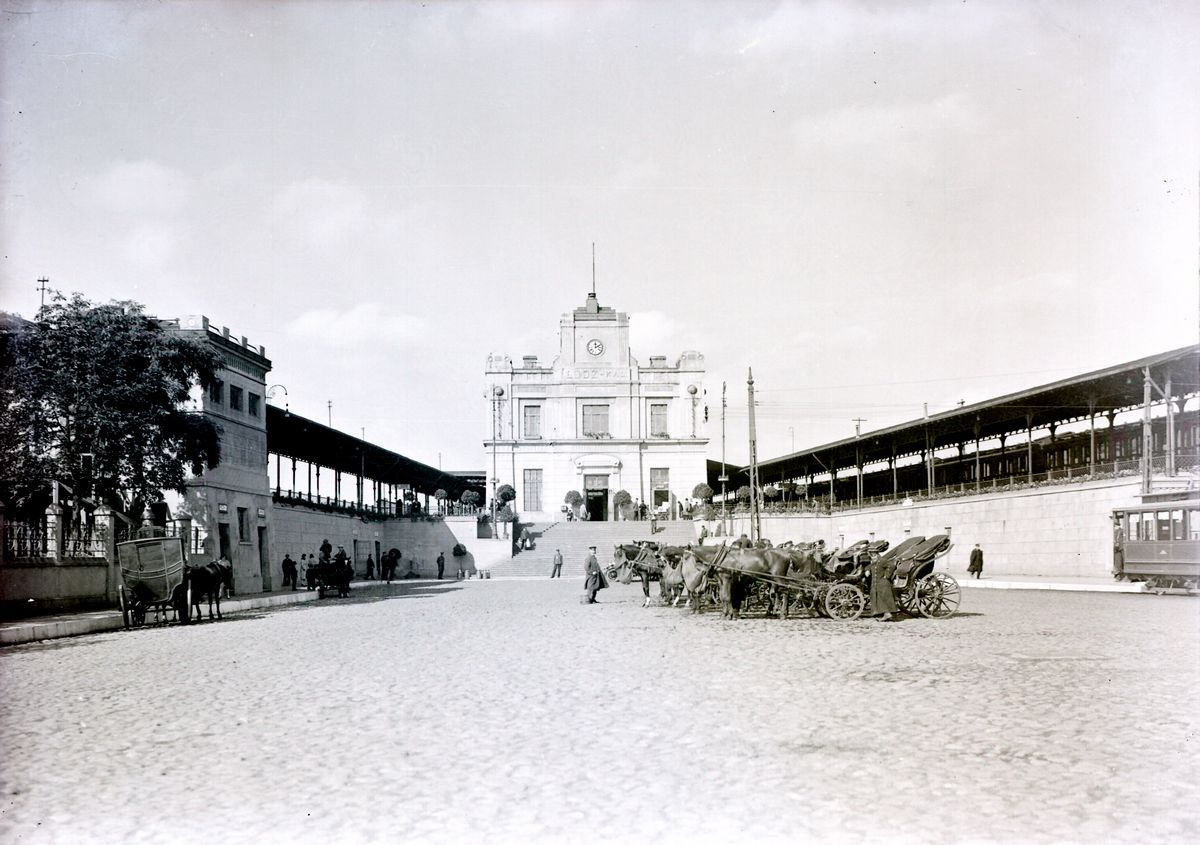
Łódź Kaliska station in 1930

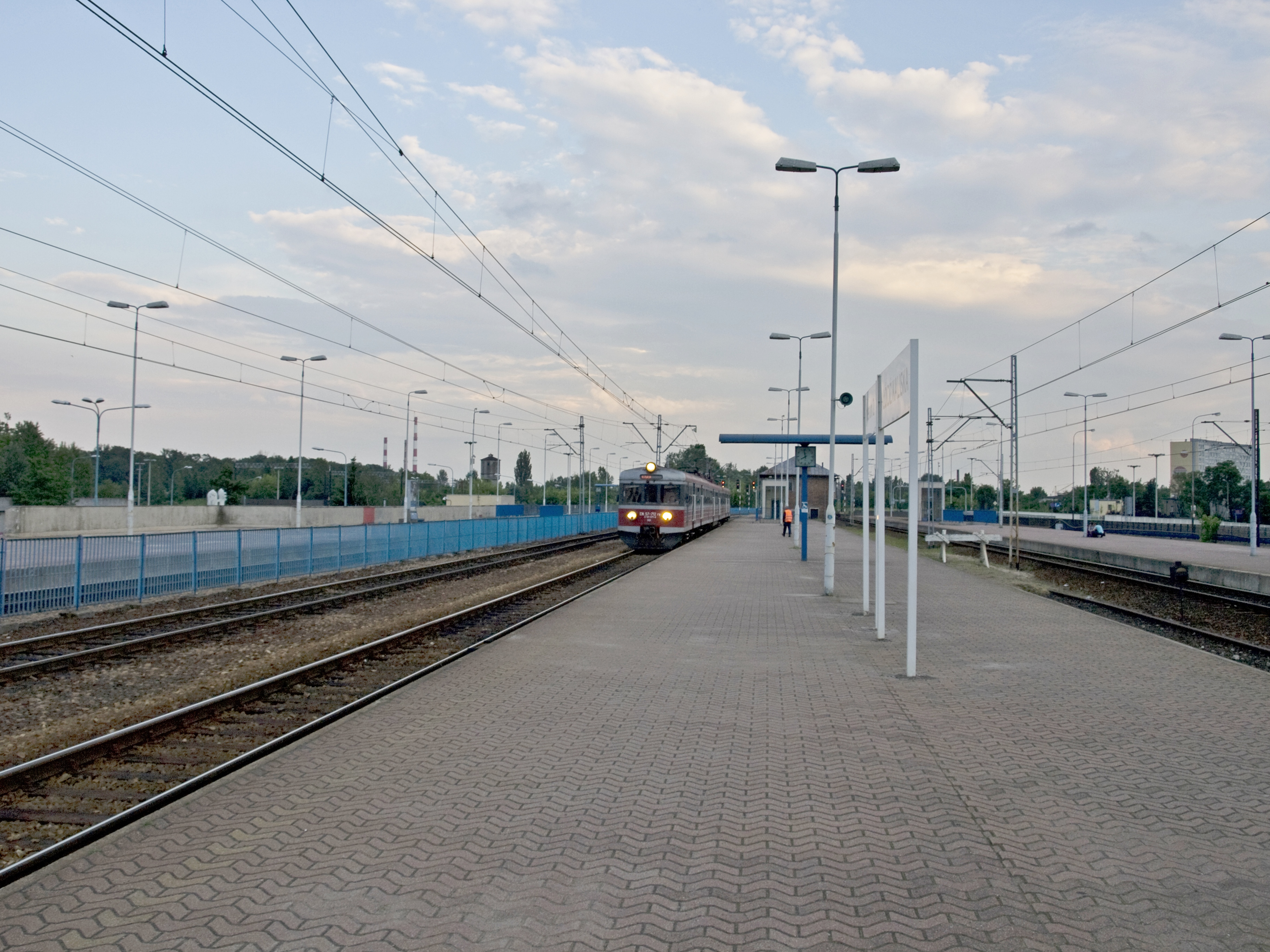
The station platforms in 2013

== Public transit ==
The station can be accessed by tram and bus lines:

- Bandurskiego - Dworzec Łódź Kaliska stop
  - Trams: 10A, 10B, 12, 14, 18
  - Buses: 6 (ZPK Markab), 65B, 80, 86A, 86B, 99
- Włókniarzy - Mickiewicza (Dworzec Łódź Kaliska) stop
  - Trams: 8, 12
  - Buses: 6 (ZPK Markab), 52, 65A, 80, 86A, 86B, 93, 99
- Włókniarzy - Karolewska (Dworzec Łódź Kaliska) stop
  - Trams: 8, 16
  - Buses: 65A, 80, 86A, 86B, 97A, 97B, 99
- Dworzec Łódź Kaliska bus terminus
  - Buses: 6 (ZPK Markab), 52, 93, 97A, 97B

== Train services ==
The station is served by the following trains:

- Intercity trains (IC) Łódź Fabryczna — Bydgoszcz — Gdynia Główna
- Intercity trains (IC) Gdynia - Gdańsk - Bydgoszcz - Toruń - Kutno - Łódź - Częstochowa - Katowice - Bielsko-Biała
- Intercity trains (TLK) Gdynia Główna — Bydgoszcz/Grudziądz — Łódź — Katowice
- InterRegio trains (IR) Łódź Kaliska — Warszawa Glowna
- InterRegio trains (IR) Ostrów Wielkopolski — Łódź — Warszawa Główna
- InterRegio trains (IR) Poznań Główny — Ostrów Wielkopolski — Łódź — Warszawa Główna
- Regiona trains (PR) Łódź Kaliska — Ostrów Wielkopolski
- Regional trains (PR) Łódź Kaliska — Ostrów Wielkopolski — Poznań Główny
- Regional trains (PR) Łódź Kaliska — Częstochowa
- Regional trains PR) Łódź Kaliska — Skarżysko-Kamienna

== Gallery ==
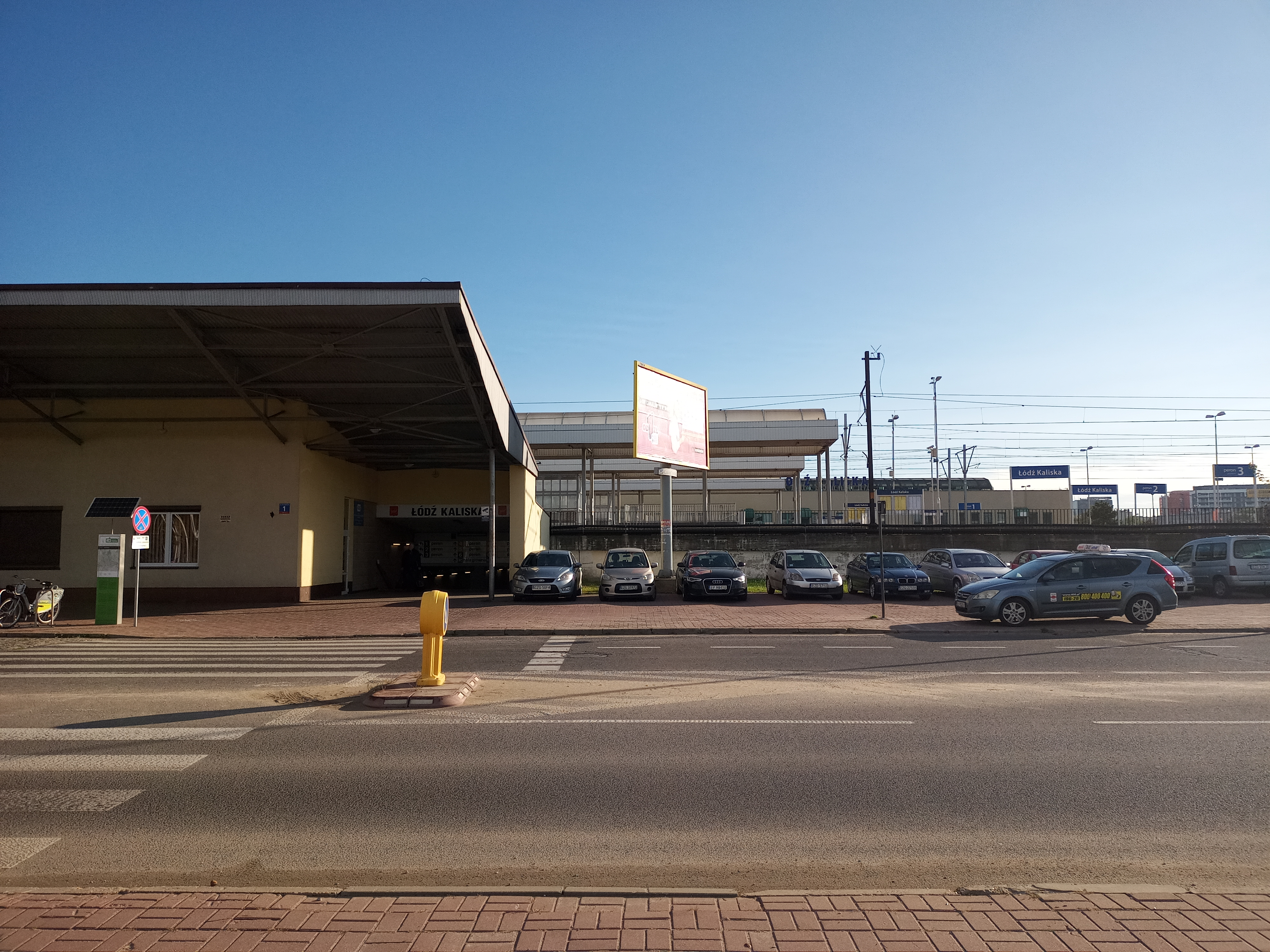

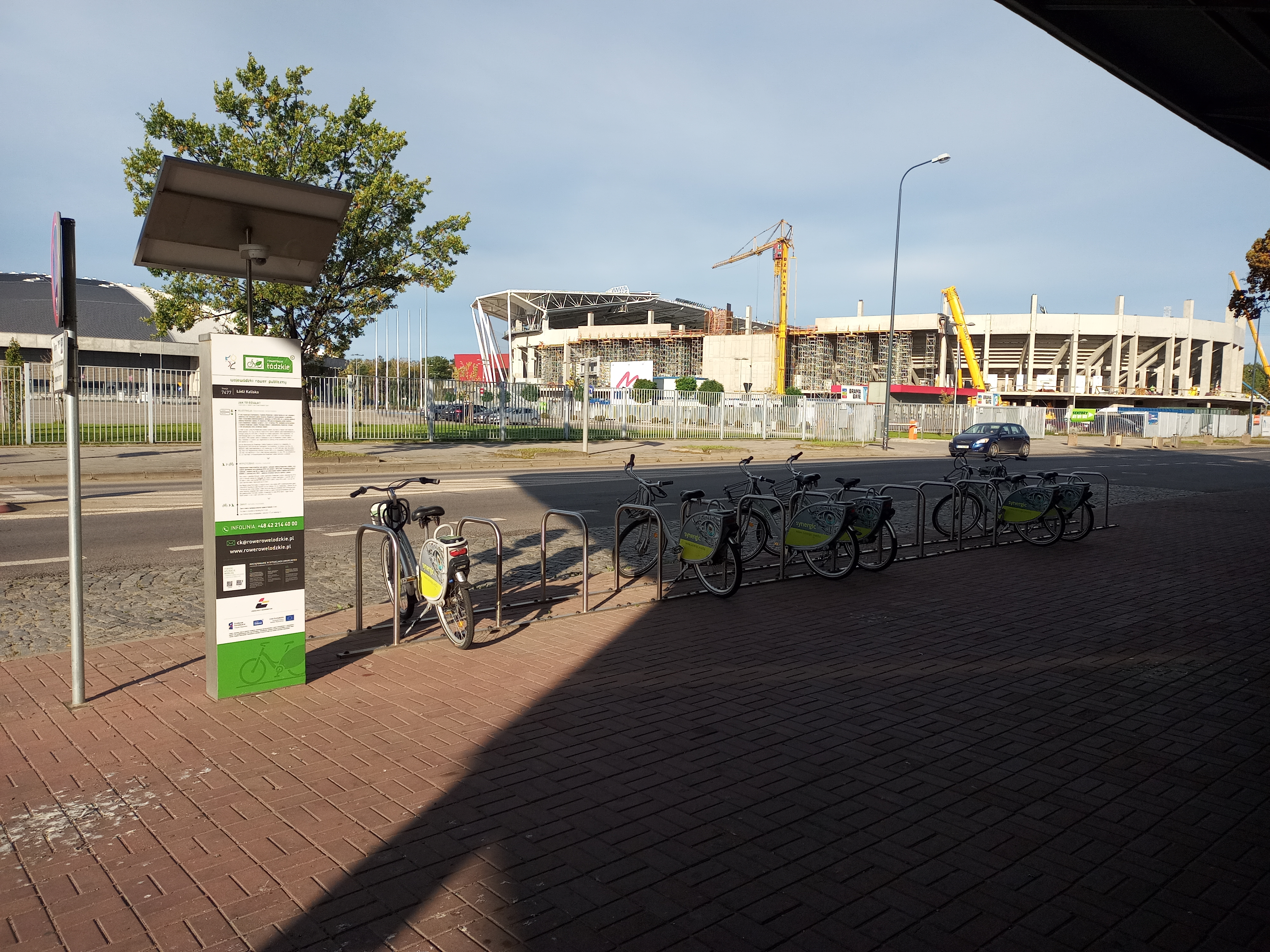

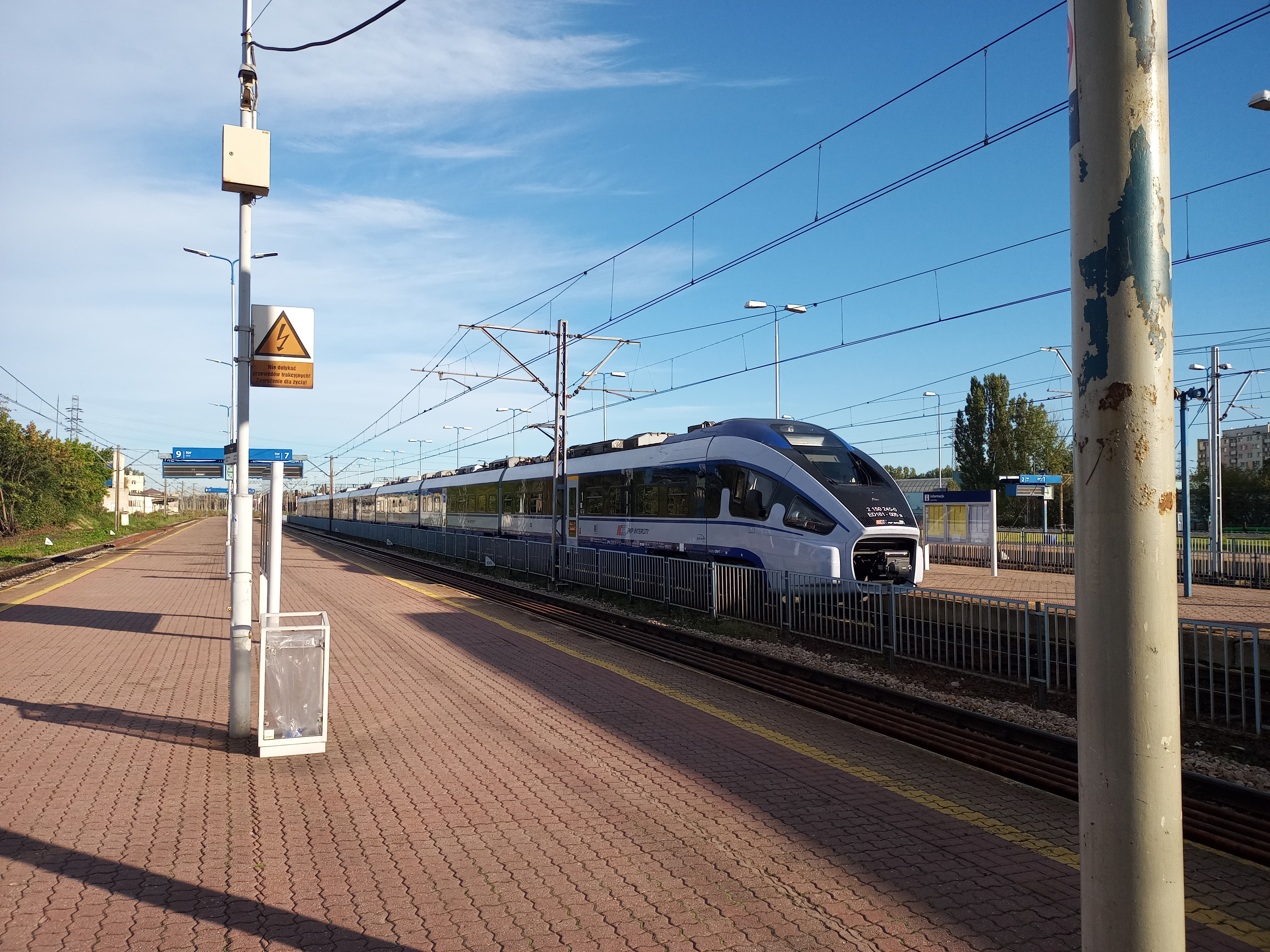

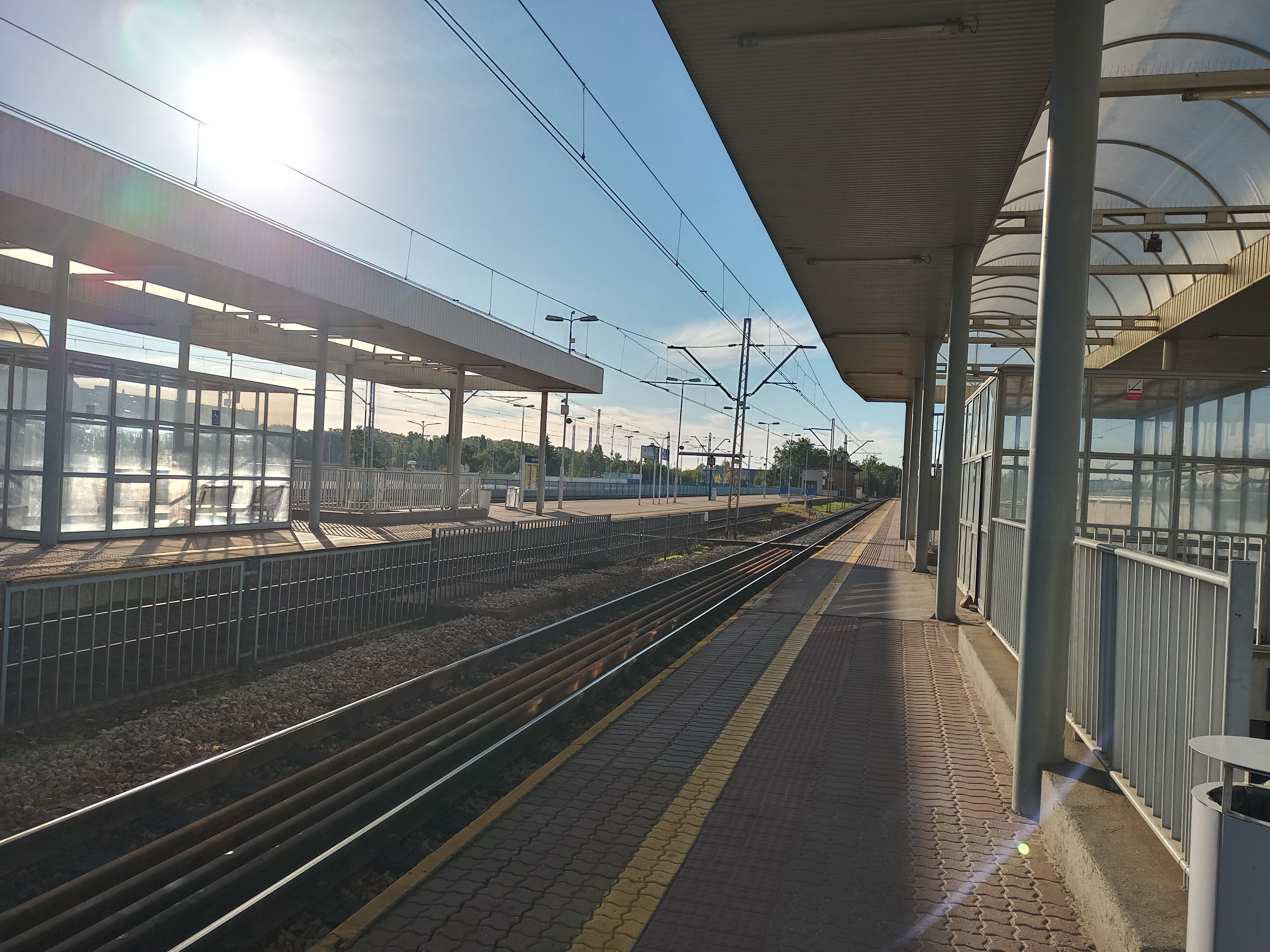

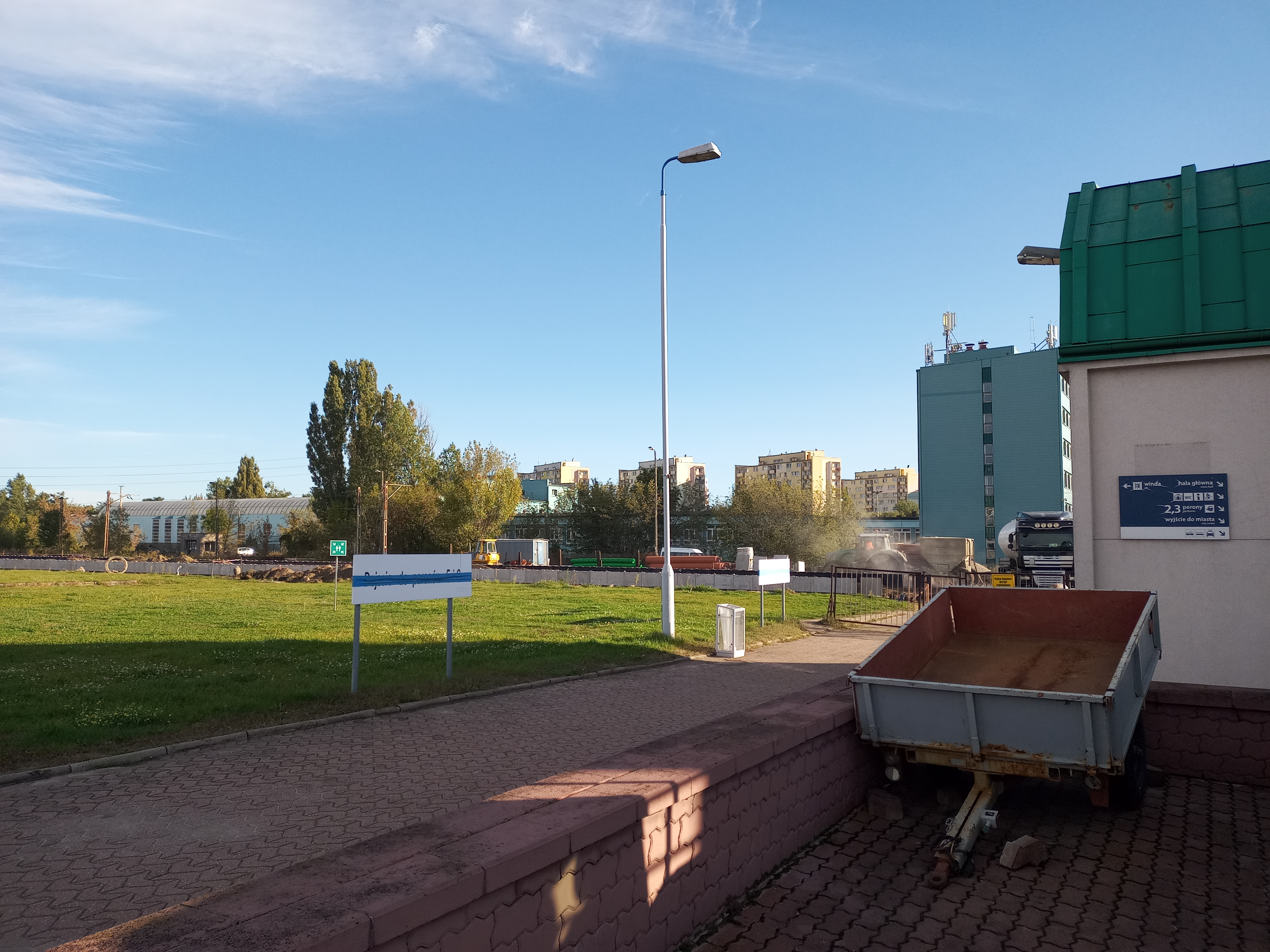

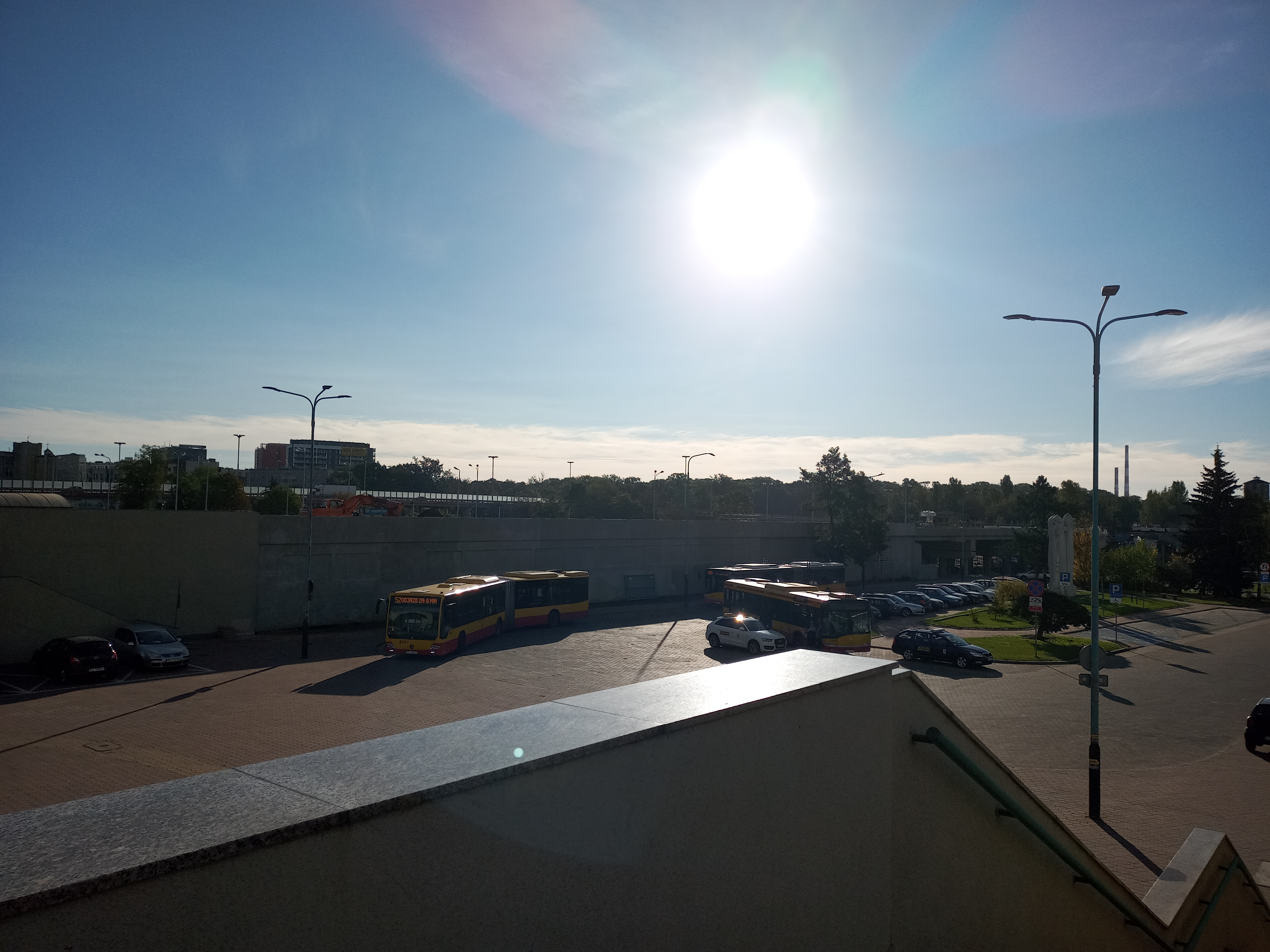

== See also ==
- Polish State Railways
