= Rose Festival =

Rose Festival may refer to:

- Rose Festival, Bulgaria in Kazanlak and surrounding towns
- Kutno Rose Festival in Kutno, Poland
- Portland Rose Festival in Portland, Oregon
- Rose Festival (Chandigarh) in Chandigarh, India
- Texas Rose Festival in Tyler, Texas
