= Mikołaj of Kutno =

Governor of Łęczyca province

Mikołaj from Kutno (Mikołaj Kucieński) (born ca. 1430 – died 1493) was a governor of Łęczyca province, a main district governor of Greater Poland, and cooperated closely with Casimir IV Jagiellon.

In 1484, he founded a church in Kutno.
