= Academy of Applied Sciences of the National Economics in Kutno =

Coordinates: 52.2360°N 19.3623°E

- Akademia Nauk Stosowanych Gospodarki Krajowej w Kutnie (ANSGK)
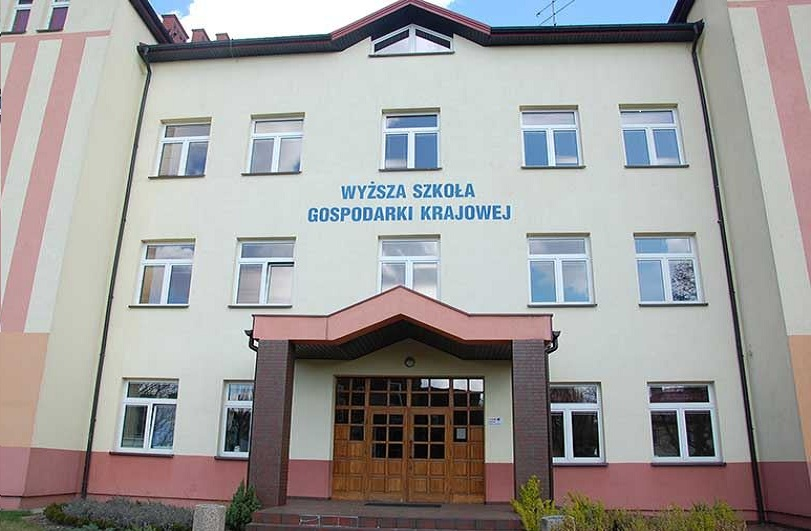
- Rector: Dr. Slawomira Byalobotska
- Address: 99-300, m. Kutno, ul. J. Lelewel 7, Kutno, Poland
- Website: wsgk.com.pl

Academy of Applied Sciences of the National Economics in Kutno (pol. Akademia Nauk Stosowanych Gospodarki Krajowej w Kutnie, abbreviated - ANSGK w Kutnie) - higher education institution based in Kutno on the street Lelewel 7, almost in the center.

It offers in-person and distance education, postgraduate education and a wide range of courses.

The university has its own houses, dormitories, social facilities and sports grounds. It also has a library and its own publishing house - "Publishing ANSGK"

There are international students’ programs, training, and excursions. The high school has its own hostels, sportive infrastructure, and libraries. Students have training in Poland and abroad.

== Departments ==
- Gardening
- Nursing (I stage)
- Nursing (II stage)
- Surveying and mapping (inż.)
- Geodesy and cartography (mgr)
- Engineering
- European studies (licencjat)
- European Studies (mgr)
- Management (its different areas optional)
- Computer science
- Special education
- Administration
- Tourism, hotel business

and other.

== Links ==
- Official website
- Taekwondo AZS WSGK
- KU AZS WSGK
