= Kutno =

City in Łódź Voivodeship, Poland

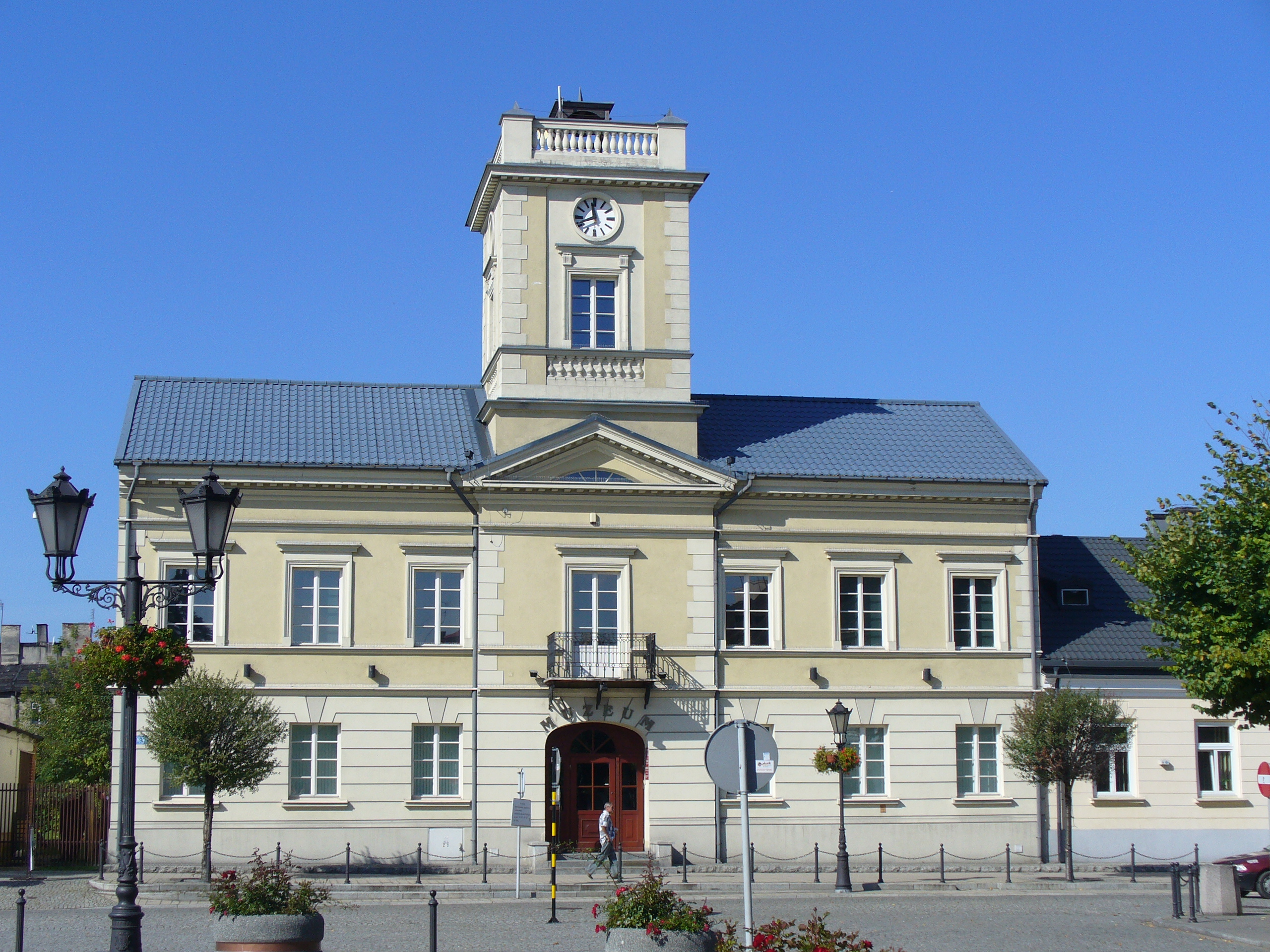
- City Hall in Kutno

- Flag Coat of arms
- Motto(s): Kutno – Miasto Róż; Kutno – City of Roses
- Location within Poland
- Coordinates: 52°14′N 19°22′E
- Country: Poland
- Voivodeship: Łódź Voivodeship
- County: Kutno
- Gmina: Kutno (urban gmina)
- City rights: 1386

Government
  - City mayor: Mariusz Sikora

Area
  - Total: 33.59 km^{2} (12.97 sq mi)

Population (31 December 2021)
  - Total: 42,704 ▼
  - Density: 1,271/km^{2} (3,293/sq mi)
- Time zone: UTC+1 (CET)
  - Summer (DST): UTC+2 (CEST)
- Postal code: 99–300 to 99–302
- Area code: +48 24
- Car plates: EKU
- Website: um.kutno.pl

Kutno [ˈkutnɔ] is a city in central Poland, with 42,704 inhabitants (2021) and an area of 33.6 km^{2} (13.0 sq mi). It is the capital of Kutno County in the Łódź Voivodeship.

Founded in the medieval period, Kutno was a local center of crafts and trade, owing its growth to its location on the Royal Route connecting Warsaw with Poznań and Dresden in the 18th century, and the railway from Warsaw to Toruń and Bydgoszcz since the 19th century. During the invasion of Poland in 1939, Polish armies under General Tadeusz Kutrzeba conducted an offensive in and around Kutno, that was later named the Battle of the Bzura.

Based on its central location and the intersection of multiple rail lines, Kutno is an important railroad junction in Poland. Two main lines cross there (Łódź – Toruń and Warsaw – Poznań – Berlin). Another connection also starts in Kutno, which connects the town to Płock. Kutno is the location of the European Little League Baseball Center and hosts the annual Kutno Rose Festival.

== Geographical position ==
Kutno is located in the northern part of the Łódź Voivodeship and is 20 kilometres (12 miles) to the northwest of the geographical center of Poland.

According to the data from 1 January 2009, the area of the town amounts to 33.59 square kilometres (12.97 sq mi).

According to the physical–geographic division of Poland, the town is placed on the western edge of Kutno plain, which is the part of Middle–Masovia macro region. At the south of Kutno plain, Kutno straddles the boundary of the Łowicko – Błońska plain, which belongs to the same region and the Kłodawa Upland plain, which spreads in the west and is counted in the southern Greater Poland. To the north of the Przedecz – Gostynin line Kujawskie lakeland begins, which is included in the Greater Poland lakeland.

Kutno is located on the edge of four historical lands. Greater Poland, Kuyavia, Masovia, and Łęczyca. It is located in what is virtually the center of Poland, at a point where geographical and historical borders, as well as in the crossing of communication lines, are of major importance to the development of the city.

=== Administrative divisions ===
Kutno has maintained the administrative units of a town (Districts, housing developments), although certain parts of the town are simply called housing developments (e.g.: Łąkoszyn housing development). These divisions are mostly historical references. For instance, the Łąkoszyn housing development is part of what remains of the town of Łąkoszyn town which was incorporated to Kutno.

The following parts of Kutno have been formulated in the National Register of Country's Administrative Division: Antoniew, Azory, Bielawki, Dybów, Kościuszków, Kotliska Małe, Łąkoszyn, Puśniki, Sklęczki, Stara Wieś, Stodółki, Walentynów, Wiktoryn, Żwirownia.

Customary Administrative Division of Kutno:

Dybów, Piaski, Rejtana, Tarnowskiego, Kościuszków, Olimpijska, Sklęczki, Łąkoszyn (New Łąkoszyn – houses and Old Łąkoszyn – housing development), Majdany, Grunwald, Batorego, Rataje (between Solidarność roundabout, Targowica and The Kutno House of Culture).

== Natural environment ==
=== Climate ===
The climate of Kutno is similar to that of the entire lowland region of Poland. The temperature is influenced by continental and oceanic airflow patterns. Kutno is in the lowest zone of precipitation in Poland. It averages 550 mm (21.65 in) per year, but this can be significantly lower in some years. This is a problem for Kutno, exacerbated by low forest cover and intensive agriculture in the area. Kutno has about five storms during the year (about half of the national average). Snow falls, on average, 39 days in a year. There are about 21 foggy days during the year in the municipal area. But near the Ochnia river fog occurs quite often. On average there are 50 sunny and 130 cloudy days every year. The wind comes mostly from the west, veering southwest in winter and northwest in summer.

July and August are the hottest months with average highs of 24 °C (75.20 °F). December and January are the coldest with average highs of 2 °C (35.6 °F) and lows of −3 °C (26.6 °F). July has the most rainfall with an average of 73mm and January has the least with 30mm.

== History ==
=== Early history ===
There are indications that the origin of the town may have taken place in the 12th century. The first mention of it was found in a document concerning an endowment of Łęczyca prepositure published due to a consecration of the collegiate church in Łęczyca in the year 1161.

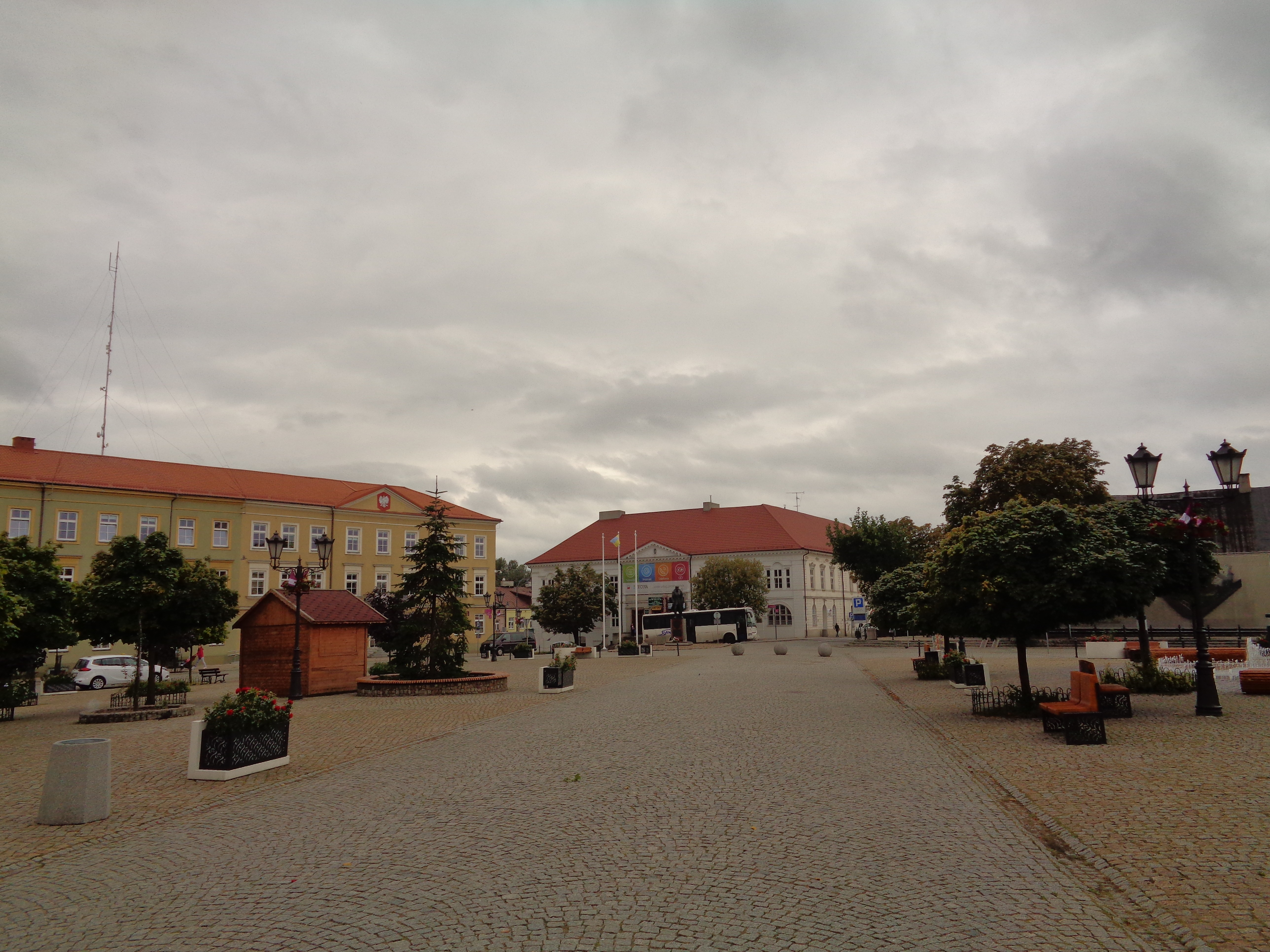
Piłsudski Square is one of the oldest areas of the town

According to the local folklore, both the town and the parish came into being in 1250, although official documentation to that effect is lacking. Most probably, the town began to be settled some time between the 12th and the 14th centuries; its name appeared for the first time in a document from the year 1301. The document had been published for his son Ziemysław by Leszek, Przemysł, and Kazimierz – duke of Kuyavia in the presence of three estate dignitaries as well as other people gathered during a convention in Włocławek. References to Kutno concern the appearance of rector Michał from the church in Kutno on the list of witnesses. In 1386, Siemowit IV, Duke of Masovia had given to Andrzej de Kutno the privilege of freeing Kutno and Sieciechów villages from all charges and burdens excluding two coins (grosz) out of every crop fee. The role of the provincial courts was transferred to the Duke. In 1386, the village of Kutno was given trade and town rights, and 46 years later, in 1432 a municipal town charter. The first records that define Kutno as a town appeared in 1444.

Kutno was historically famous for its rose fair which after 1989 changed its name to The Festival of Roses/The Rose Festival.

=== Early modern period ===
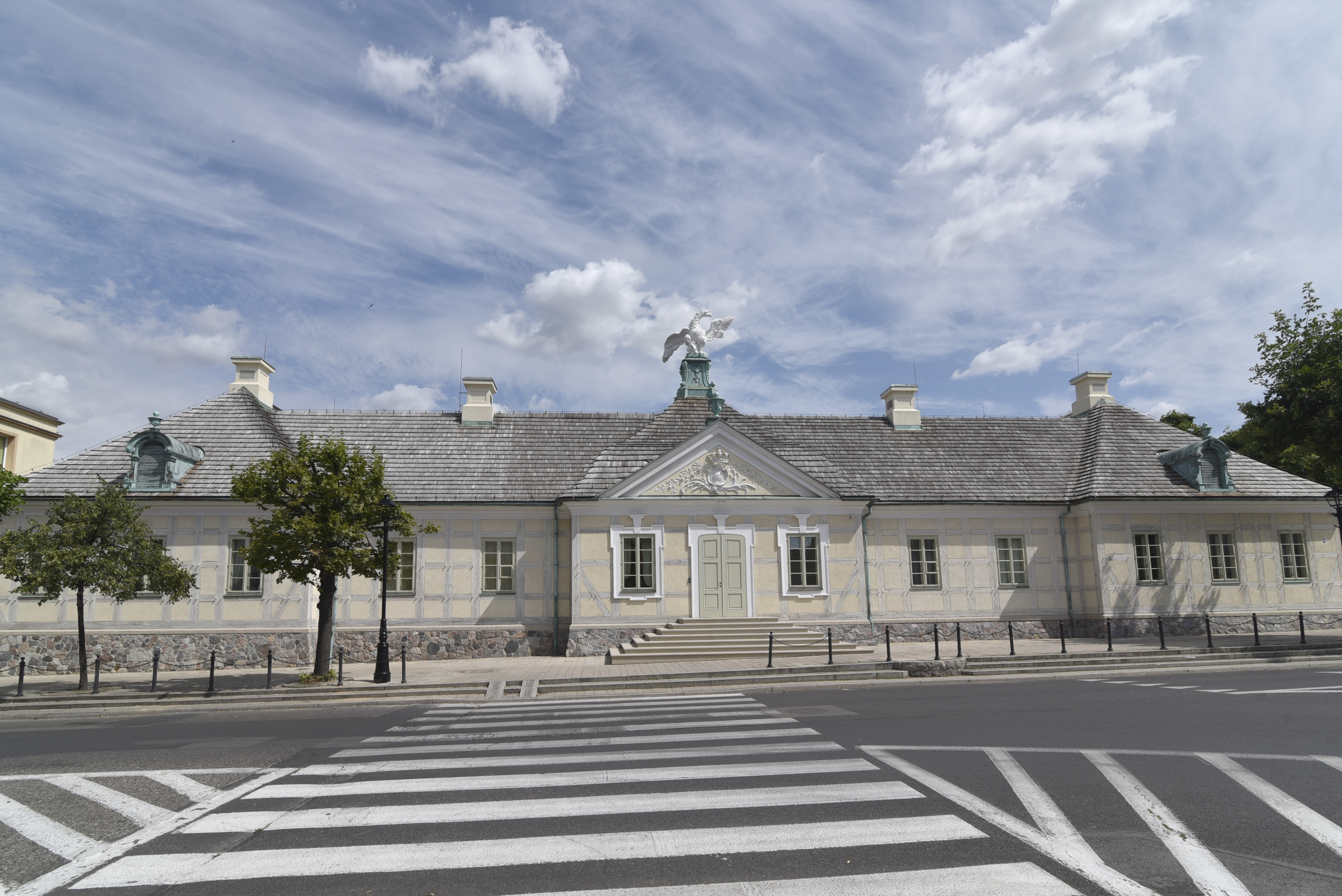
Baroque residence of King Augustus III of Poland, place of his stay during travels between Warsaw and Dresden, now a museum

Kutno was a private town, administratively located in the Gostynin County in the Rawa Voivodeship in the Greater Poland Province of the Kingdom of Poland. 1 July 1504: Mikołaj of Kutno gained the right to hold the St. Wawrzyniec fair, improving the development of the town's trade. In 1701, the Kucieński family gave up Kutno to Anna Zamojska. The Zamoyski family fought amongst themselves for the property for a long time. The town fell into debt but the situation had normalized when Andrzej Hieronim Zamoyski became the owner of Kutno. During that time Kutno was a town of prosperity and development. A route connecting Warsaw with Poznań and Dresden ran through the town in the 18th century and King Augustus III of Poland often traveled that route. The town's prestige increased after Augustus III ordered the construction of the Postal Palace and consequently, the Saxon Palace was built between 1750 and 1753, after a royal track leading from Dresden to Warsaw had been built. The palace was decorated with rich interiors according to John M Walter's plans. In 1753, Kutno was completely burned, resulting in the loss of the town records along with the settlement grant. After the fire, the King's Lord Councillor Andrzej Zamoyski left Kutno in order to obtain another settlement grant, however, the town suffered another fire due to one of the many army march-passes in 1774 and the easygoing attitude of soldiers.

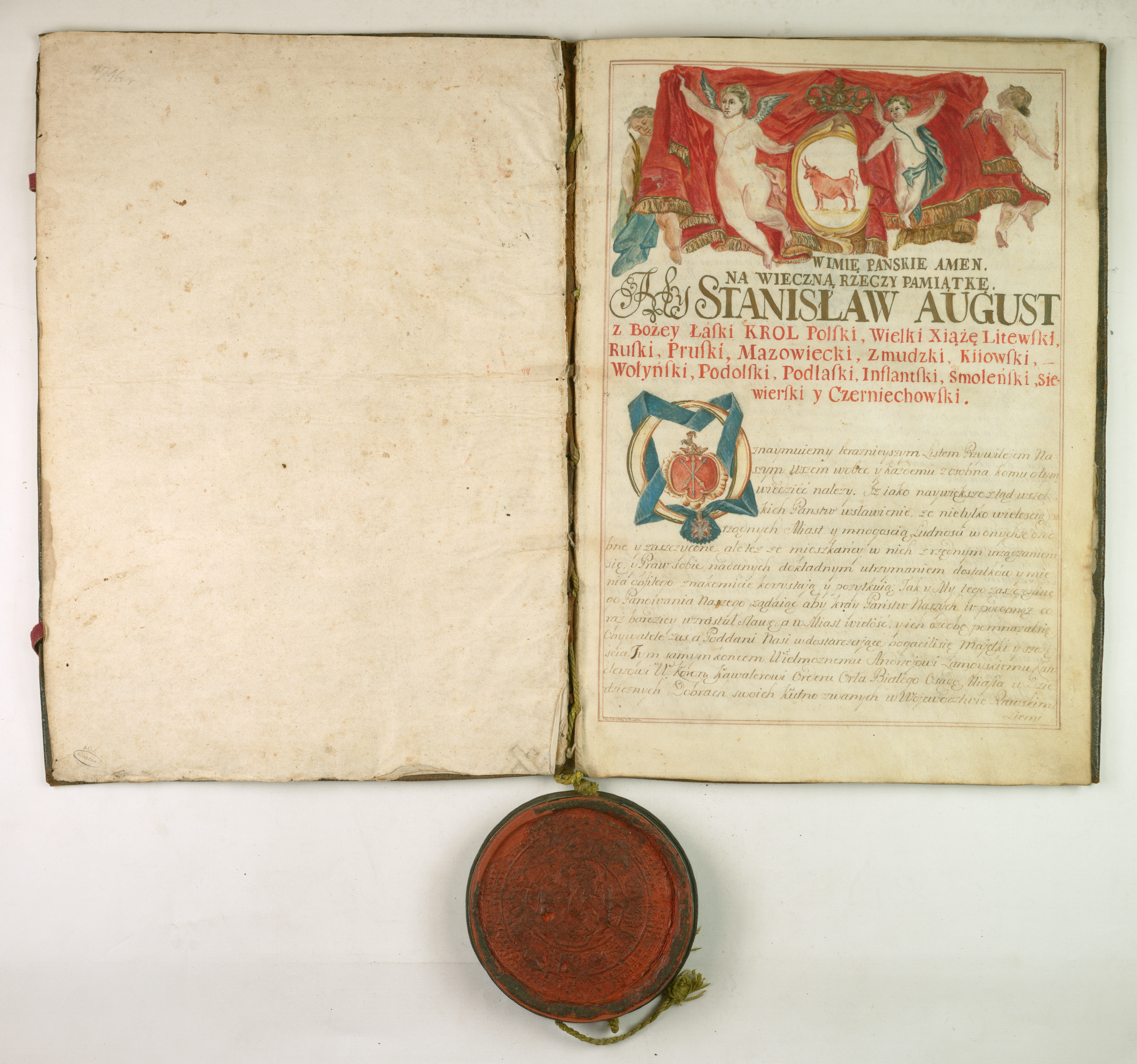
The 1766 royal decree granting city rights and privileges based on Magdeburg Law

In 1775, Andrzej Zamoyski sold Kutno to Stanisław Kostka Gadomski – governor of Łęczyca province. Under his reign, Kutno became one of the biggest settlements in central Poland. The Second Partition of Poland occurred in 1793. Kutno had been completely under Prussian control and became part of the newly created province of South Prussia. The whole province of Kutno became part of the Łęczyca department, then after the Third Partition, it became part of the Warsaw department.

=== Late modern period ===
On 4 January 1807, Napoleon Bonaparte passed through Kutno. In 1807, under the Treaties of Tilsit, Kutno became part of the Duchy of Warsaw. An 1808 fire, most likely set by Napoleon's army, destroyed 180 houses. In 1809 Kutno was visited by Jan Henryk Dąbrowski. After 1815, the area was incorporated into the Congress Kingdom of Poland. In 1826, the first town map was published due to the planned rebuilding of the town. In 1826, Fryderyk Chopin travelled through the town.

In 1840, a chapel was built which later became the Museum of the Battle of the Bzura river. Built in the Neo-Renaissance style and rotunda shape and crowned with a dome, it is part of the Wiosny Ludów park. It formerly served as a mausoleum for the Rzątkowski and Mniewski families. Another fire destroyed nearly all of the houses on Królewska St. Only two buildings remained – nowadays Crocantino and MDM. In 1844, the first hospital in Kutno was opened, sponsored by Kutno's former owner Feliks Mniewski. A City Hall was built in 1845 in classicistic style. The building, located in the Marshal Piłsudski square, currently serves as the Regional Museum, in which one can see mementos and records from the history of Kutno.

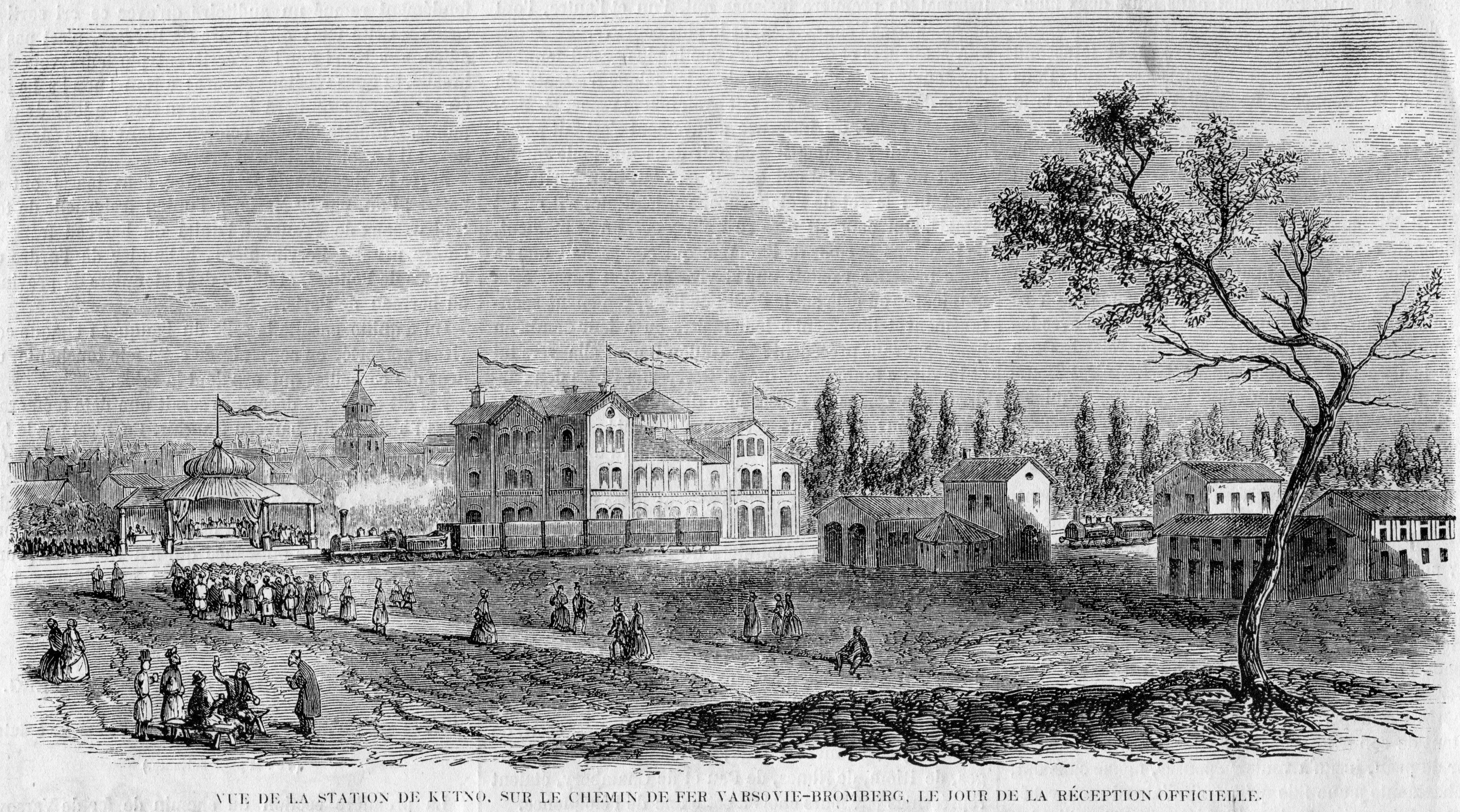
Kutno train station in the 1860s

In 1862, the Warsaw – Bydgoszcz railway line opened, leading Kutno to become an important railway junction and a trade and industry center. Directly before and during the period of the January Uprising, Kutno was the seat of the head of the Gostynin province. During the January Uprising, clashes between Polish insurgents and Russian troops took place in Kutno on 1–2 July and 8 August 1863.

In 1867, Kutno district was formed. This state endured until World War I outbreak. In 1886, on the place of the former Gothic church, the St. Lawrence Church (designed in a neo-Gothic style by Konstantyn Wojciechowski) was built.

On 5 January 1904, the Polish writer Henryk Sienkiewicz, a Nobel Prize laureate, stayed in the Town Theatre, which was the seat of the Fire Brigade at that time. Income from his lecture was given to the poor children of Kutno. After his speech, a ball was held, to which only men were allowed, while women could watch it only from open windows.

The famous Polish-Jewish writer Szalom Asz was born in Kutno in 1880. In his collection of short stories "Miasteczko" ("The Town"), he described the situation of Jewish people from this town – Kutno. Every two years, the town holds the Szalom Asz Festival, which includes a literary contest about his works. In the 19th c. Kutno was a center of a sizeable Jewish community. In 1900, 10,356 Jews lived there.

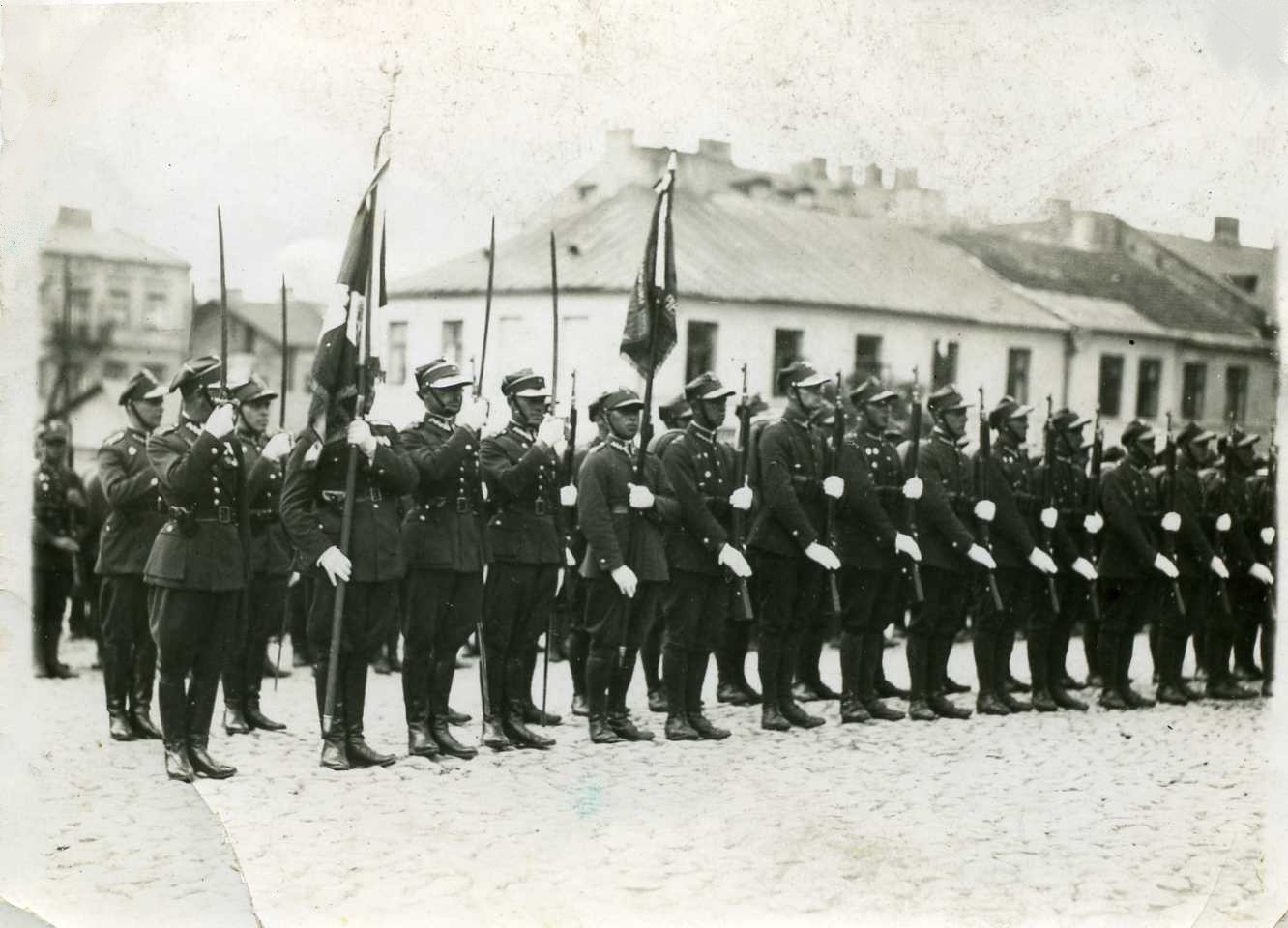
Honourable Guard of the 37th Infantry Regiment with banner – 1933

From 15 to 16 October 1914, the Battle of Kutno took place between the Russian and the German. The Russians lost the battle, and the loss of Kutno provided the Germans with a direct access to Warsaw. In 1915, a local parish priest Franciszek Pruski was executed by a firing squad. A plaque commemoratinf this event has been placed in the St. John the Baptist church.

Many Kutno inhabitants took part in the Polish-Bolshevik War. They also fought in the Siberian Division. After the war, hundreds of 15-year-old boys enlisted in the Army Mining Corps, today known as the miner–soldiers.

From April 1919 to January 1921, a future French president Charles de Gaulle stayed in Kutno, as an instructor with the French military mission under general Louis Faury. On 5 March 1938, Kutno received its blazon, which depicts two rampant wild boars on the yellow background, leaning against a green bulrush.

=== World War II ===
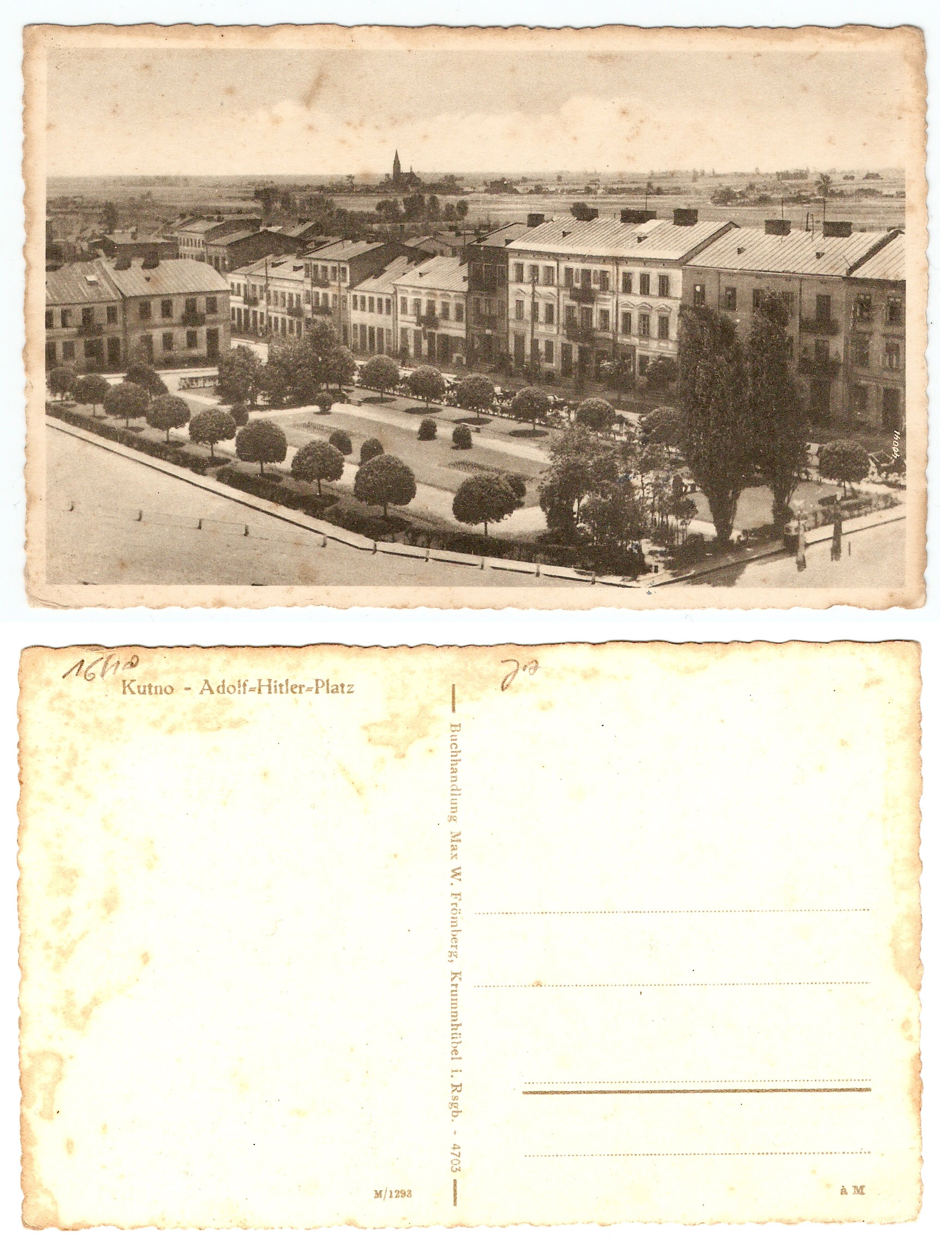
German postcard from Kutno showing the central city square, renamed Adolf Hitler Platz under German occupation, now Piłsudski Square

The Battle of the Bzura river took place from 9 to 12 September 1939 during the German invasion of Poland, which started World War II. On 9 September the Poznań Army (Armia Poznań) operational group, led by General Edmund Knoll-Kownacki, attacked the German 8th Army led by General Johannes Blaskowitz. On 11 September Poland's Pomorze Army reinforced the Polish troops in battle. At first, the Polish assault was successful but the Germans reinforced their troops on 12 September and started to counterattack. General Tadeusz Kutrzeba ordered Knoll to retreat beyond the Bzura river. Kutno remained outside the battle area. Despite the ultimate defeat of Polish army, the Battle of the Bzura river made the Germans change their strategy and regroup and also delayed the capitulation of Warsaw.

On 16 September 1939, the German Wehrmacht moved into Kutno, bombarding trains, the railway station, and houses throughout the district. At the junction of what is now Kochanowski Street and Maja Street, a German saboteur laid down a target for the bombers bombing the railway station.

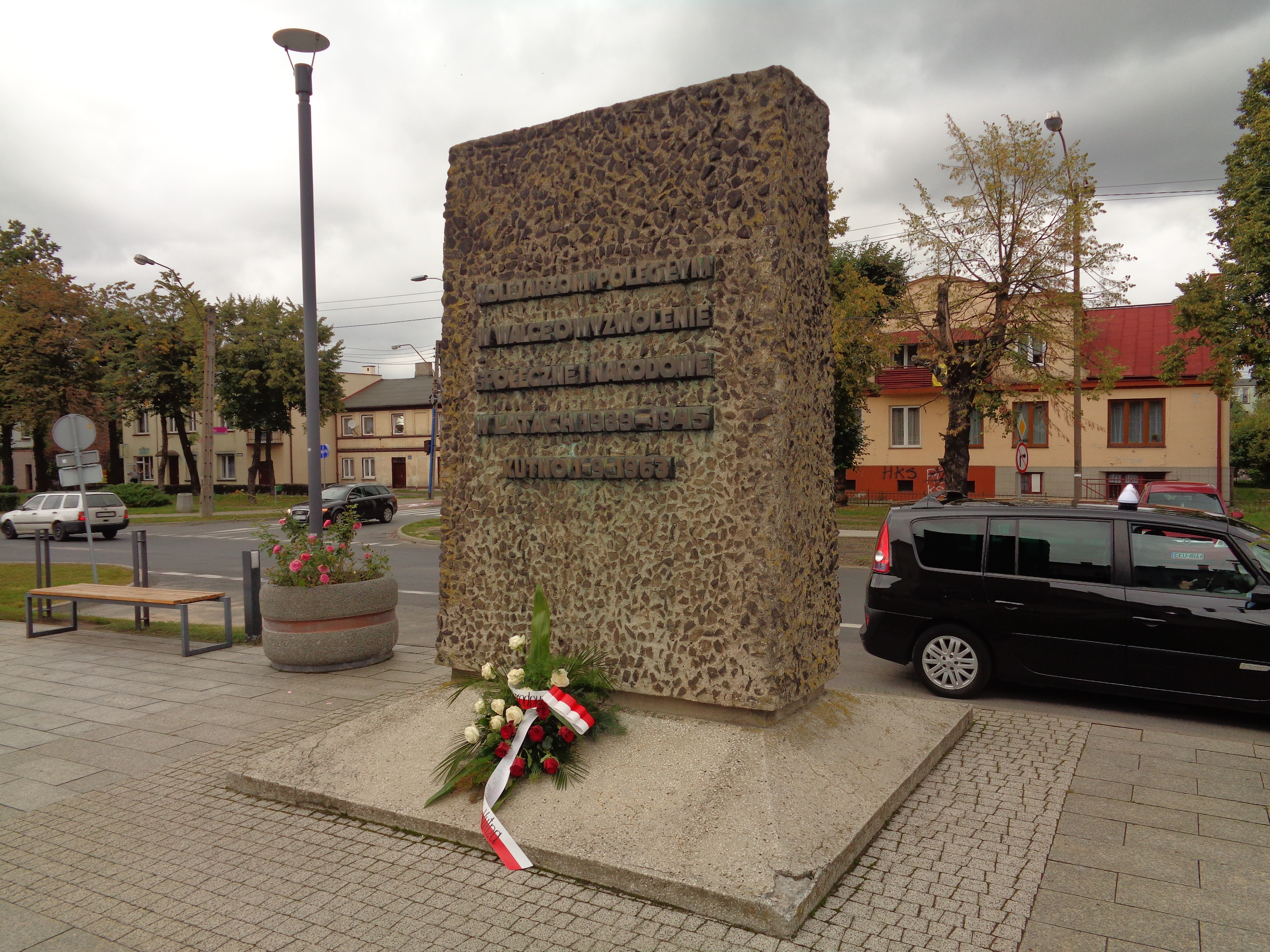
Memorial to Polish railwaymen who died in fight during World War II

The area was annexed directly to Germany, and administratively became part of the Third Reich's Reichsgau Wartheland, within the district/county (kreis) of Kutno. In December 1939 expulsions began in accordance with Nazi Germany's racial and ethnic policies, which aimed to make the town population purely German. People were forced to leave their houses early in the morning with only an hour's notice and could take only 50 kg (110 lb) of baggage and a small amount of money. Expulsion was very often carried out with violence. People were transported by trucks or wagons and then in sealed trains. The trip was up to eight days long, in terrible conditions. Poles from Kutno were also among the victims of a massacre carried out by the German police in February 1940 near Gostynin (see Nazi crimes against the Polish nation). On 14 April 1940, during the AB-Aktion, most of the Polish teachers from the Kutno district were arrested. Only a few survived having had left their houses earlier or having been prewarned. At least 173 Poles from Kutno and the county were murdered by the Soviets in the Katyn massacre in April–May 1940 or died in Soviet camps.

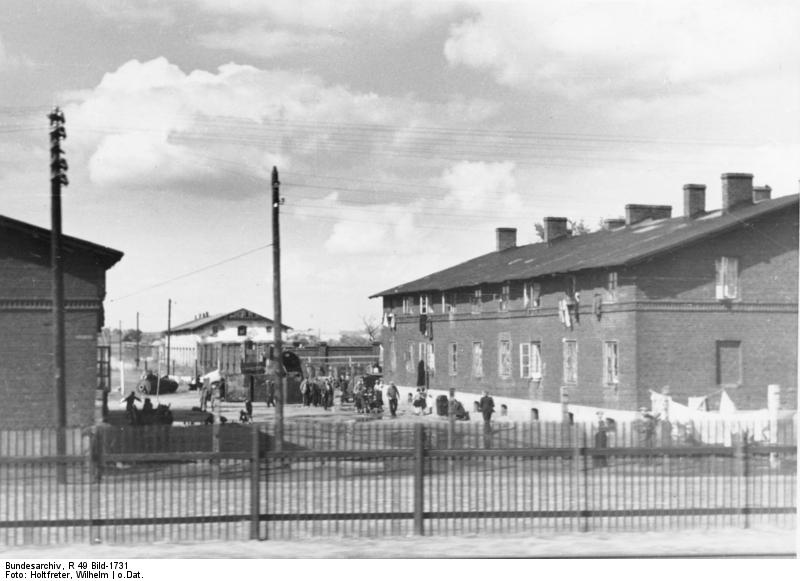
Ghetto in Kutno

Subsequently, the Germans created a ghetto in Kutno on 15 June 1940. The entire area of a former sugar factory ("Hortensja" or "Konstancja" according to various sources) was surrounded by barbed wire. On the first day, the Poles were forbidden to leave their houses, while the Jews were forced to take all their belongings and proceed to the factory. The German soldiers and SS members beat the Jews standing in the street. Eight thousand people were transferred to the area of the factory, within five buildings. On the first day, crowded and without any first-aid facilities, a few people died. The only food they had was a small amount of potatoes and bread. Prices of extra food were very high. For instance, one kilogram of potatoes cost 40 Pfennig in the ghetto, while it was 5 Pfennig in the rest of the town. However, a true nightmare started in winter, when there was not enough firewood, so that the Jews had to burn furniture or scaffolding.

In the following year, 1941, due to overcrowding of resettled people and transport difficulties, a concentration camp was established at 7 Przemysłowa St. Due to terrible conditions in the camp, about 10 persons died of dysentery every day.

On 9 June 1941, at present-day Wolności Square, three Poles, Kalikst Perkowski, Wilhelm Czernecki and Piotr Sanda, were publicly executed in punishment for smuggling food to Warsaw. Their deaths were intended to be a lesson and the presence of locals at the execution was compulsory; even the families of the executed were there.

On 19 March 1942, the ghetto was closed. All Jews, in alphabetical order, were deported to Koło and then to the Chełmno extermination camp. The 6,000 Jewish inhabitants of Kutno were killed there, while elder people who had been ghetto administrators were killed in Kutno itself. Additionally, a forced labor camp operated in the area from January 1942 until January 1945. In 1943, 31 members of the Polish resistance were sentenced by the Germans in Dresden, 24 of them to death and executed there. On 19 January 1945, the Red Army arrived in Kutno, ending the German occupation, and the town was restored to Poland, although with a Soviet-installed communist regime, which remained in power until the Fall of Communism in the end of the 1980s.

=== 1945–1989 ===
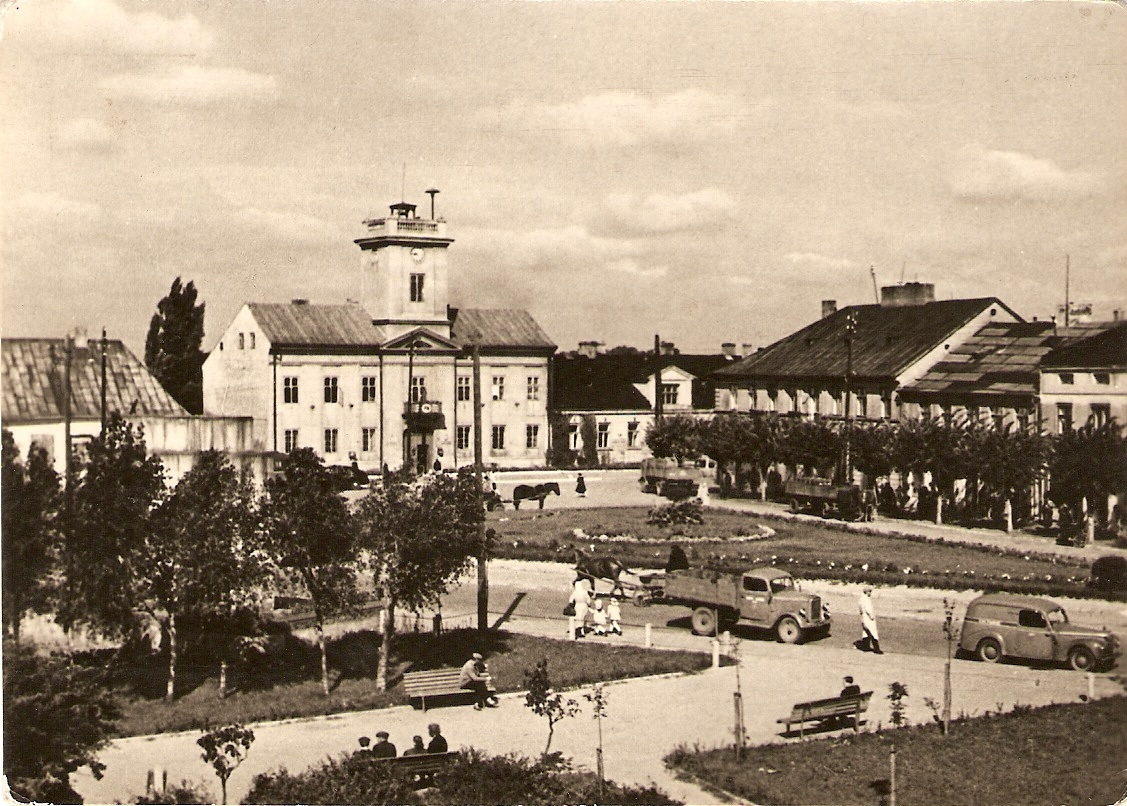
View of present-day Marshal Piłsudski Square on postcard 1950–1960

Cultural institutions resumed activity during first years after the war. Firstly, posts that had existed before 1939 were reopened. In June 1945 the Kutno District Public Library was opened. Thanks to donations by the public and the regaining of books that had been kept during the war, the library's collection grew rapidly. The public library was and still is fulfilling its important role in broadening culture.

The Polish anti-communist resistance was active in Kutno, including the nationwide Home Army and the local Mściwy Jastrząb (Vengeful Hawk) youth organization.

Because of developed railway and road trails, Kutno has been attractive for investors. Among the many branches of industry in Kutno, the most important was the electronics industry. In 1957 Radio Components Company Miflex opened, and would eventually employ over three thousand people. The Company is one of the important distributors of capacitors, anti-interference filters. At the Marshal Piłsudski square Polish – Soviet brotherhood was constructed, depicting two persons: Red Army soldier and People's Army of Poland soldier shaking hands with each other. After the monument had been constructed incidents such as vandalism and defacing it with paint by local high school students, members of the Mściwy Jastrząb organization, occurred.

In 1968 Kazimierz Jóźwiak, who was a choreographer and manager as well as director of the Kutno House of Culture founded the "Song and Dance of Kutno`s Land Band" ("Zespół Pieśni i Tańca Ziemi Kutnowskiej"). In 1971, the former Town Hall at the Marshal Piłsudski square Kutno Regional Museum was reopened. In 1975, the city was adjoined to the Płock Voivodeship and would remain so for the next 23 years. Annually, since September 1975, the Kutno Rose Festival takes place at the Kutno House of Culture, which has long been a center of cultural events in Kutno.

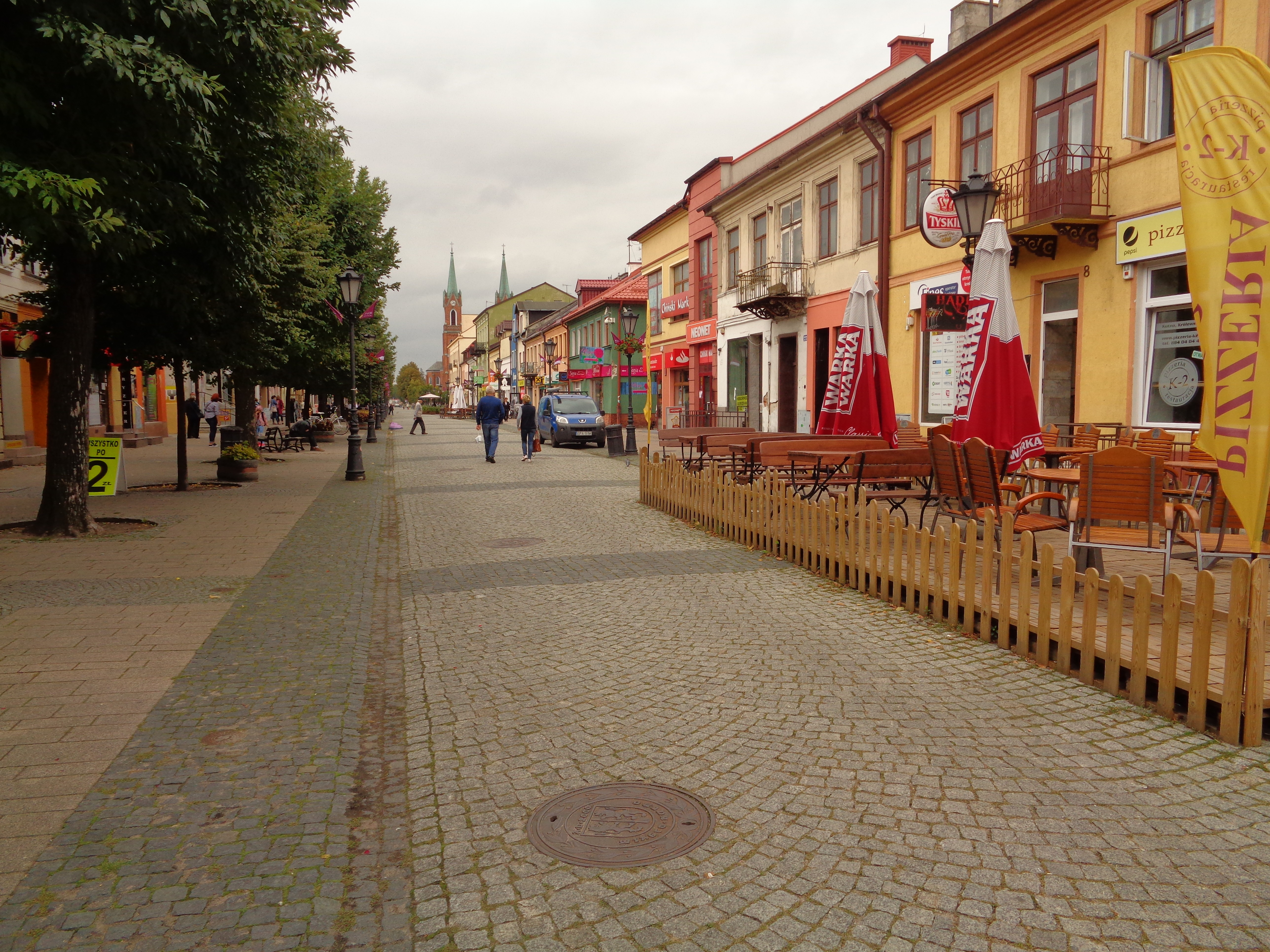
Królewska Street is the town's main promenade

=== After 1989 ===
In 1990 formula of the fair has been changed as well as its name: from The "Rose Fair" to "The Rose Festival"

In 1996 International Little League Baseball Tournament took place in Kutno. Since that time Kutno is the world-famous seat of the European Little League Baseball Center. On 18 August 1998 Higher School of Economics has been opened in Kutno in 7th Lelewel St. In 1999 because of an administrative resolution, Kutno district once again become part of the Łódź province after 24 years. In 2001, Królewska St. and Marshal Józef Piłsudski Square were renovated.

== Economy ==
=== Kutno Agro–Industrial Park (KAIP) ===
As a result of decisions made in the 1970s, industry investments began being located in the eastern part of Kutno - Sklęczki - now Kutno Agro-Industrial Park. The decisive factor was access to the A2 motorway and the presence of a system of sidings connected with the E20 railway. KAIP began in 1996 during construction of the National Center for Food Processing and Distribution. Construction was led by the Urban Institute and the U.S. Agency for International Development and was opened in 1998. KAIP is constructed on 370 hectares, and now has over 60 businesses of local and foreign capital operate within its boundaries. Nearly 6,000 people are employed here. The food industry, packaging, plastics processing, manufacturing of agricultural equipment, and pharmaceuticals are the dominant branches. 111 hectares were set aside as part of the Special Economic Zone of Łódź.

=== Kutno subzone of the Łódź Special Economic Zone ===
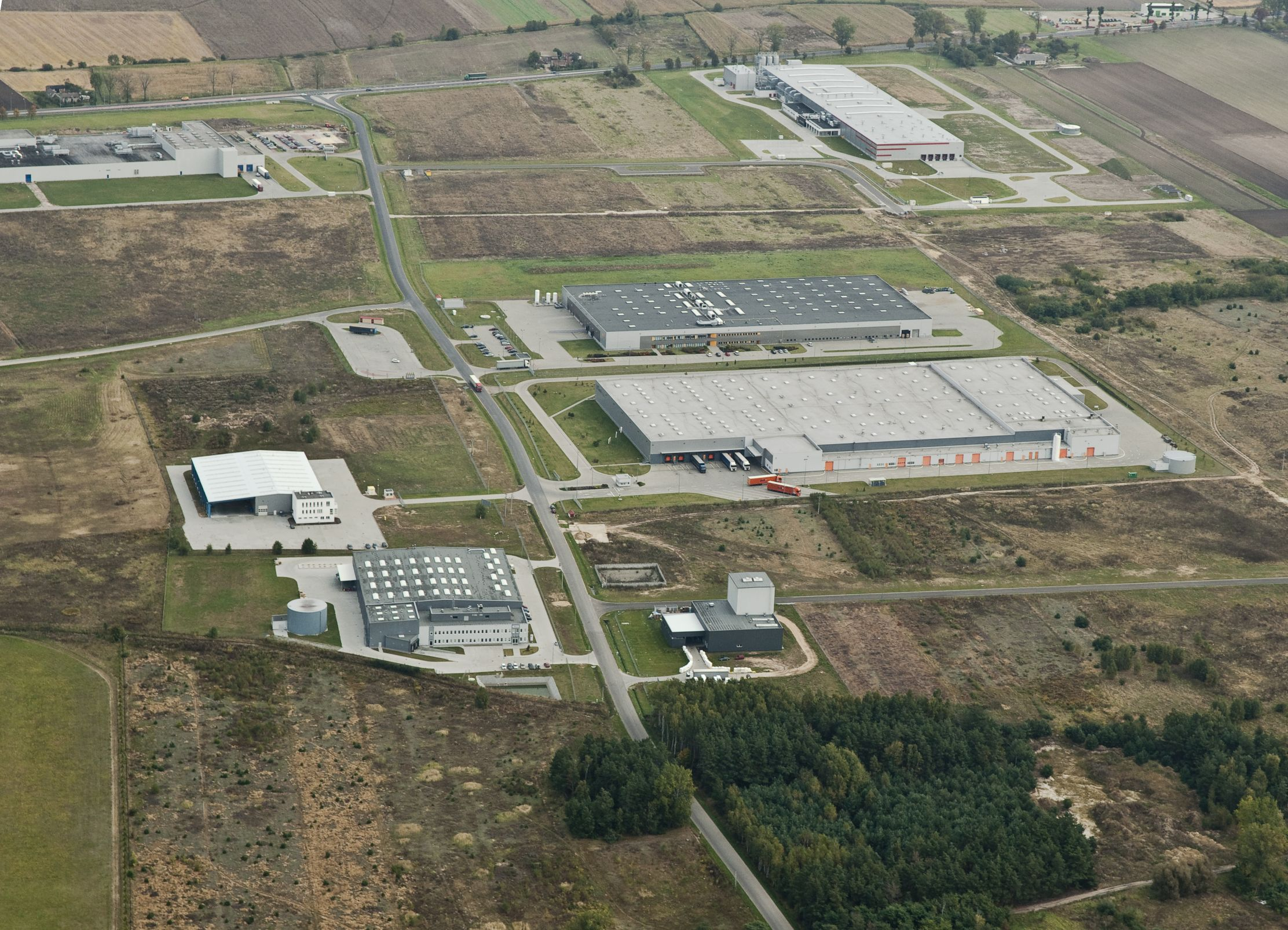
Wschodnia St. industrial park in 2009

In 2000, the Town Council created the Łódź Special Economic Zone in Kutno Agro-Industrial park. It was originally 23 hectares and had four zones: Odlewnicza St. (4.24ha), Sklęczkowska St. (6.48 ha), Stalowa I and II (7.87ha and 4.49ha). The Sub-zone has been broadened in the following years: 2002, 2005, twice in 2007 and in 2010.

According to data from the end of January 2010, the whole area of Kutno sub-zone is 111 hectares. Capital investments of companies operating only in the Kutno sub-zone have exceeded the value of 1 billion PLN over the last 10 years.

=== Industry in Kutno ===
- Pharmaceutical industry: Teva Kutno, Polfarmex, Fresenius Kabi Poland, Nobilus Ent, Trouw Nutrition International (a part of Nutreco)
- Engineering and Metallurgic industry: Kongskilde, Skiold BL, Ideal Europe, Florian Centrum, Kraj, Miflex-Masz, AMZ Kutno, Libner Poland, Fermator (Enginova), Profilplast
- Electronics industry: Miflex (a former branch of Unitra),
- Transportation: Nijhof-Wassink, Hartwig Poland
- Food industry: Exdrob, Kofola, Polmos, Pini Polonia, Pringles
- Construction industry: Schomburg Polska, Vester, Urbud, Mavex, Trakt, Kutnowska Prefabrykacja Betonu (Kutno Concrete Prefabrication), Mawex, Aarsleff, ProfilPas
- Packaging and plastic industry: DS Smith, Fuji Seal Poland, PrintPack Poland, Paja Folie, Sirmax Poland, PolyOne Poland Manufacturing, Elplast

== Tourism ==
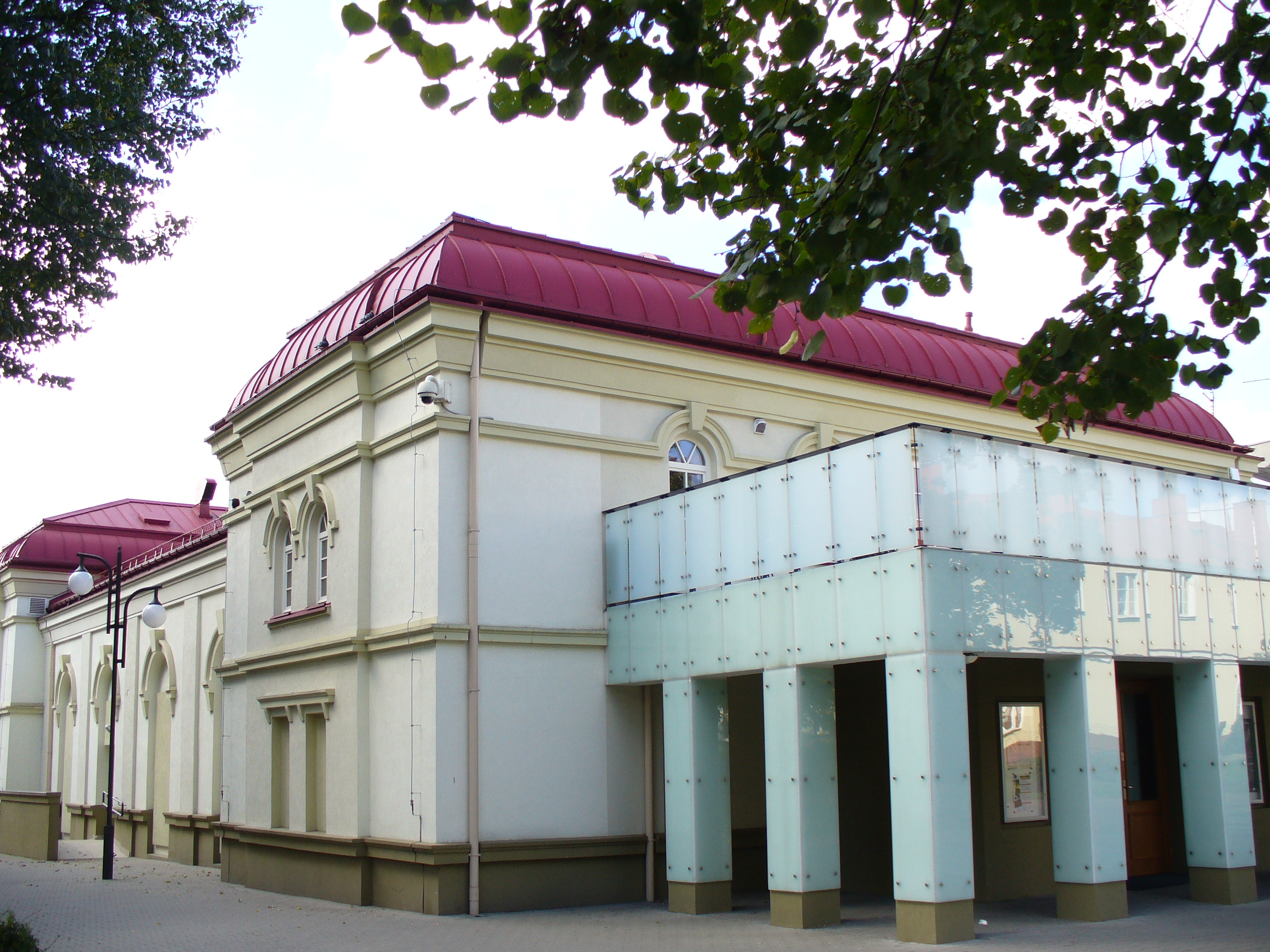
Old theatre building

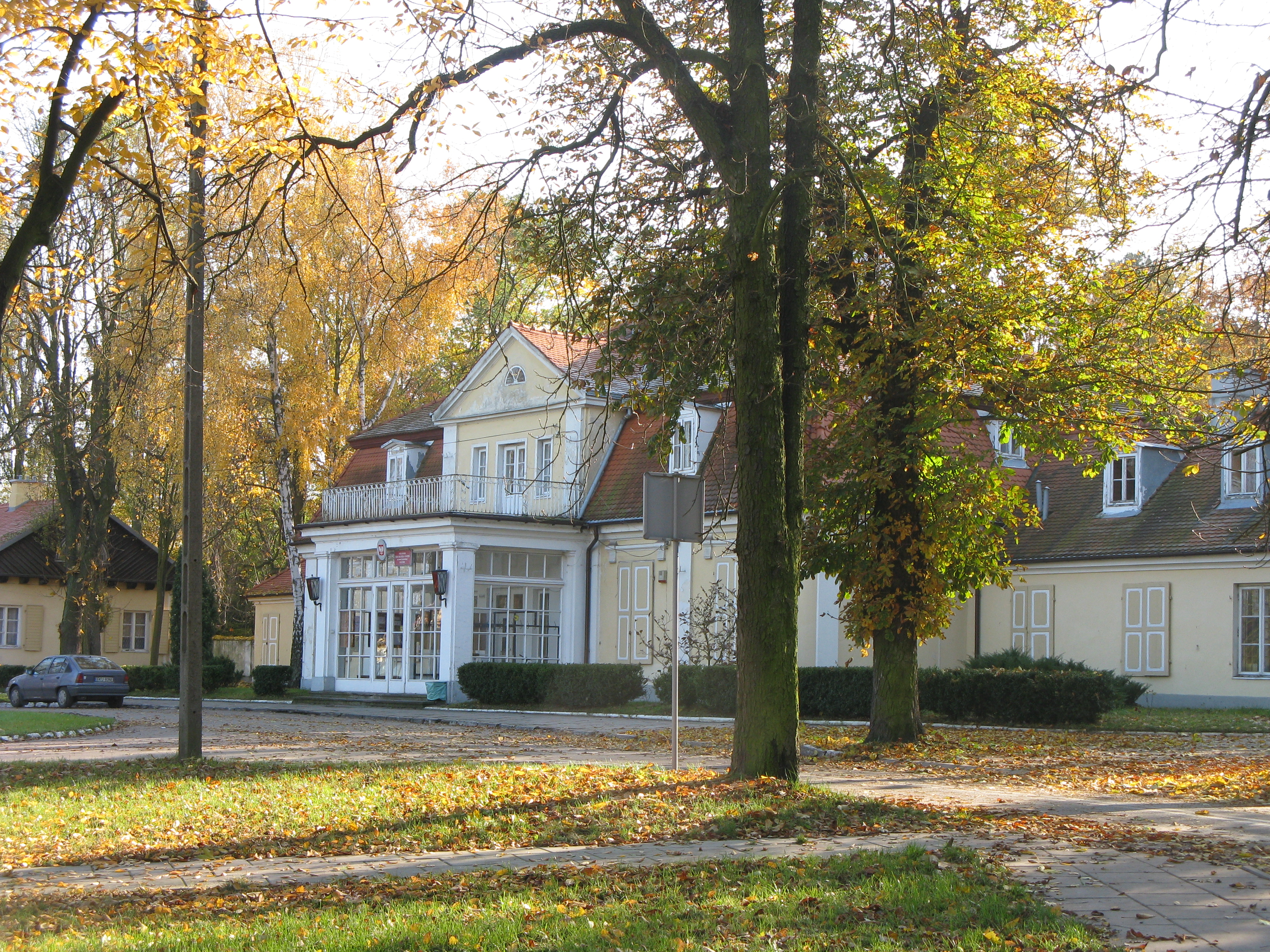
Complex of Gierałty's palaces, currently K.Kurpiński's National Music School of 1st and 2nd degree in Kutno

- Old Town – two markets connected to Królewska St. that after the modernisation made along with Piłsudski square has become town's showcase, a place where Kutno citizens can spend their free time. Taking a walk around Old Town one can easily find marks of the medieval concept of Wolnośći square, church or Zduński fair (Zduńska St. and Tetralna St.). Current buildings at New Town and in Królewska St. have been constructed in the first half of the 19th century.
- Kutno Town Hall – currently place where Regional Museum is located
- Museum of the Battle of the Bzura river – at Wiosny Ludów park where grave chapel of Mniewscy family is located. It was built in the 19th century. Currently, the place where Museum of the Battle of the Bzura River is located
- Postal Palace – known also as the Saxon Palace that was used by king Augustus III on his travel way from Warsaw to Dresden. The building is one of the oldest in town; it was constructed in the 18th century. On 11 December 1812, Napoleon Bonaparte stayed there during his escape from Russia.
- Complex of Gierałty's palaces – property of the owners of Kutno. Currently seat of National Music School. Palace was constructed between 1781 and 1785 years. In 1920 Charles de Gaulle paid a visit there. Wiosny Ludów park is located behind the palace.
- Manor house of Chlewiccy (also called Modrzewiowy) with column-shaped veranda from the 1st half of 19th century – currently seat of the Companionship of Friends of The Kutno land.
- Manor house of Szymańscy – constructed in the first half of the 18th century. Currently it a hotel with restaurant.
- Izaak Holcman's villa by the Solidarność rotary. Currently a health center.
- Villa in the 8th Matejki St – constructed during the years 1927 to 1929 for the family of engineer Ryszard Macher
- "New Inn" building – formerly seat of the Provisional government on the first days of the January Uprising.
- Former St. Valenine hospital
- Lutheran church
- Dr Antoni Troczewski's Villa
- Complex of postfactory buildings of "Kraj" owned by Alfred Vaedtke
- Former city theatre at the Zduński Market (formerly House of Volunteer Fire Brigade)
- Motor mill in Warszawskie Przedmieście St.

=== Churches in Kutno ===
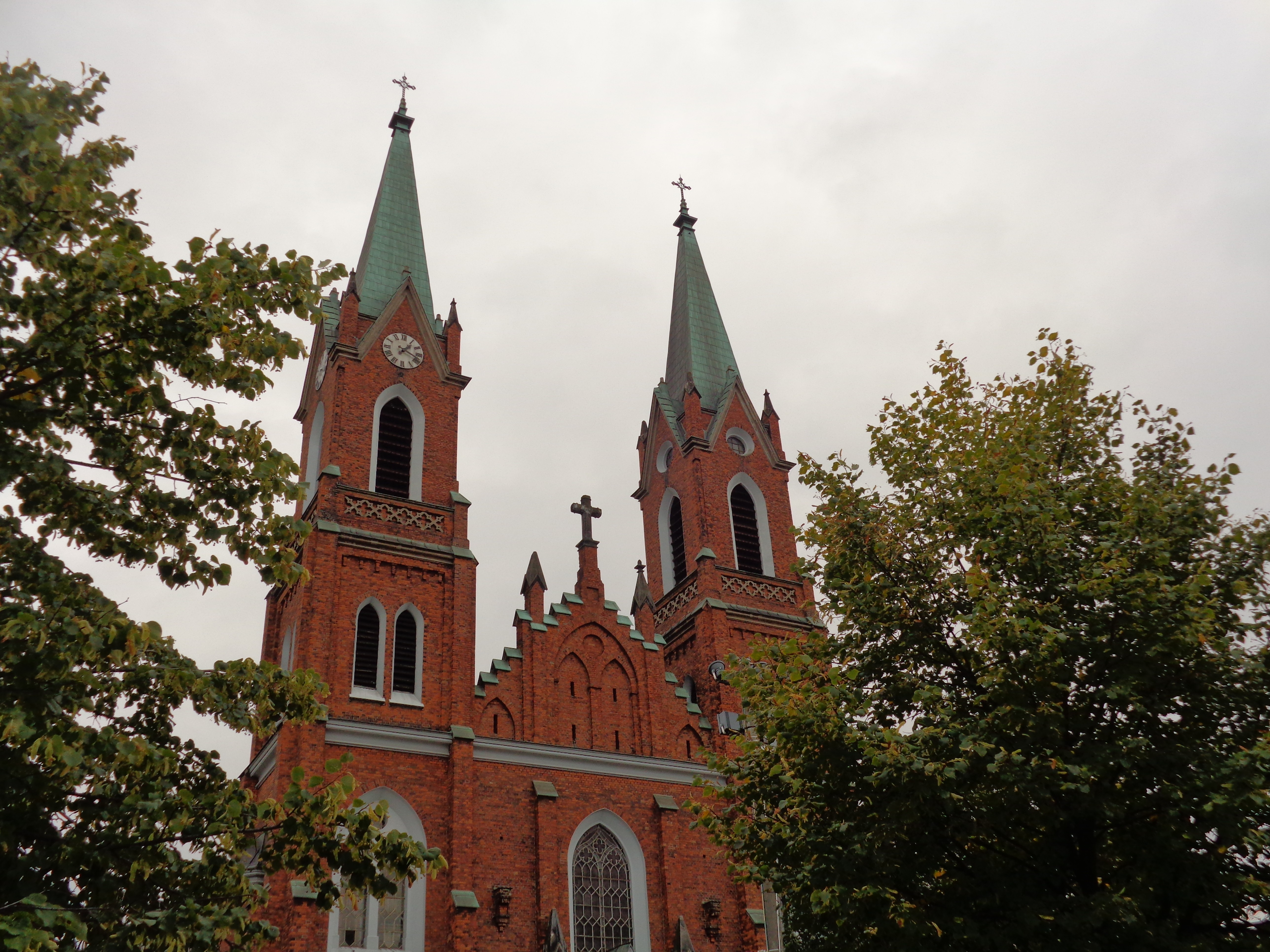
Saint Lawrence Catholic Church

- St. Lawrence Parish – founded in 1301. The first reference about St. Lawrence the Martyr comes from 1301 and mentions parish priest Michał. The first presumed wooden construction of the church was in the 13th century during the efforts to construct village parishes. It was a small church made in a Gothic style that had lasted until 1483 when burned down. The new one was funded by the Mikołaj from Kutno in 1484. It was made in gothic style, a one-aisled church with set apart presbytery and tower on the west side and St. Anne chapel adjacent to the aisle. In 1883 because of high-level of damage church had been decided to be pulled down. Construction of the current one ended in 1886 according to a design made by Konstantyn Wojciechowski. Basilical, neo-gothic church has two towers with clock placed on the top of one.
- St. John the Baptist Parish – founded in 1988. The main altar consists of a relief depicting Resurrected Christ, Consecration by Pope John Paul II in Łowicz on 1 June 1999.
- The Saint Queen Jadwiga Parish – founded in 1990. On 8 June 1997 on Kraków grasslands Pope John Paul II Consecration Cornerstone for the construction of this church.
- St. Stanislaus the Martyr Bishop Parish – founded in 1297
- The Our Lady of Perpetual Help Parish church – founded in 1988
- Saint Michael the Archangel Parish – is placed in Woźniaków district.

=== City parks ===
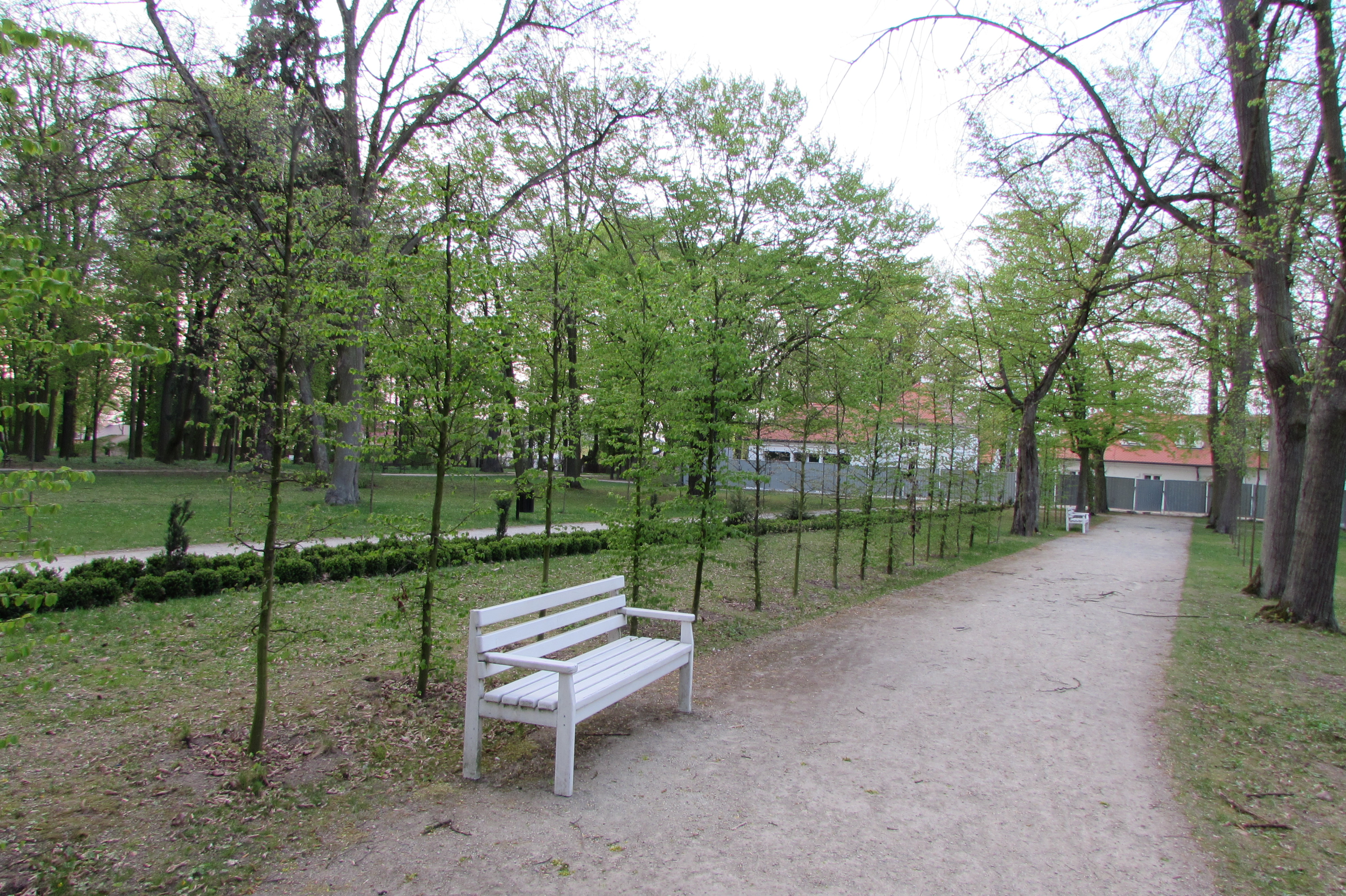
Park Wiosny Ludów (Spring of Nations Park)

- Wiosny Ludów Park – is the oldest and simultaneously biggest park in Kutno (area 17,1ha). Once it was a palace garden by the Gierałty's Palace and came into being during the years 1775 to 1791. Park is separated in two parts, first one is a symmetric garden that is similar to the shape of French garden. The other one is landscape English garden, which came into being during the years 1826 to 1840. In the western edge of the park stands chapel in the memory of Mniewscy family (owners of Kutno from the 19th century).
- Romuald Traugutt City Park – placed in the central part of town on the area of 4,2ha. Has been founded during Poland's twenty years of independence after World War I as a place where one can reSt. Park is placed on terrain with diverse heights which gives him interesting landscape composition with pond being placed on the lowest part. At first, it was just an industrial pond nowadays it is adapted to leisure functions. Most of the cultural events in Kutno take place there. Stefan Żeromski's public library and Kutno House of Culture are placed in there.
- City park by the Ochnia river – is the newest park in Kutno. Groundworks ended there in 2003 year. Park's small woodiness gives it a modern image. Football and Basketball pitches located in the neighborhood create opportunity to practice sports.

== Education ==
Kindergartens, elementary schools and middle schools:

- Jarzębinka Integrational Municipal Kindergarten nr.3
- Stokrotka Municipal Kindergarten nr.5
- Municipal Kindergarten nr.8
- Fable's Municipal Kindergarten nr.15
- Cindarella's Municipal Kindergarten
- Forget-me-not's Municipal Kindergarten nr.17
- Catholic Kindergarten
- Elementary school in Gołębiew
- T.Kościuszko Elementary school nr.1
- M.Kopernik Elementary school nr.4
- Elementary school nr.5
- M.Skłodowska-Curie Elementary school nr.6
- W.Jagiełło Elementary school nr.9
- Catholic Elementary school of catholic school friends association in Wierzbie
- A.Mickiewicz Middle school nr.1
- J.Piłsudski Middle school nr.2
- H.Sienkiewicz Middle school nr.3
- W.Anders Catholic Middle school of catholic middle school friends association in Wierzbie
- Middle school in Byszew
- St.Stanislaus Kostka Catholic Middle school of catholic middle school friends association

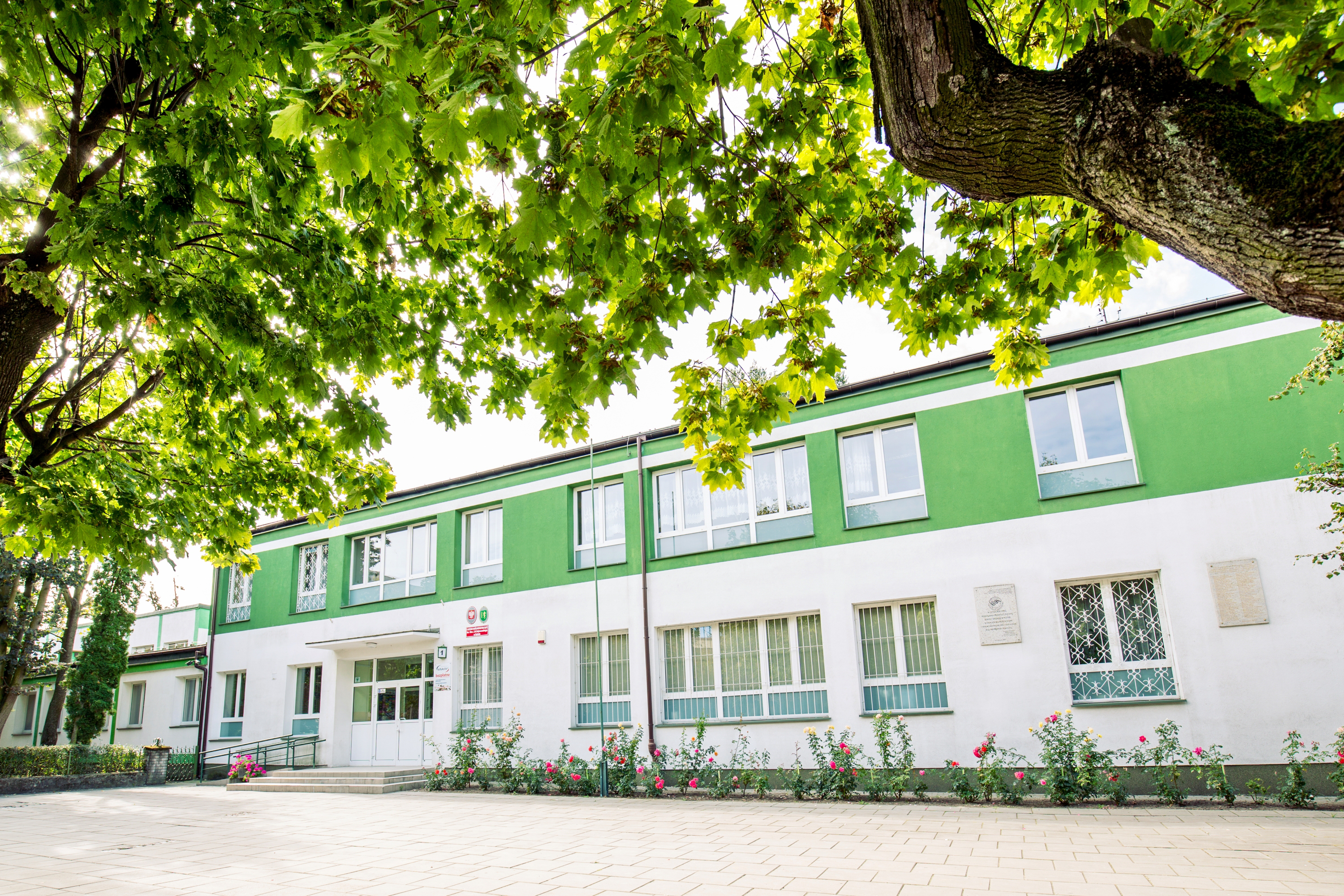
Jan Henryk Dąbrowski High School No. 1

High schools

- Zbigniew Religa Academic High School
- Jan Henryk Dąbrowski High School No.1 (so called "Dąbrowszczak")
- Jan Kasprowicz High School No.2
- St.Stanislaus Kostka Catholic High School association of catholic school friends (so called "Katolik")
- Stanisław Staszic nr.1 set of schools (so called "Mechanik")
- A. Troczewski nr.2 set of schools (so called "Margaryna")
- Wł.Grabski nr.3 set of schools (so called "Ekonomik")
- Z. Balicki nr.4 set of schools in Kutno – Azory

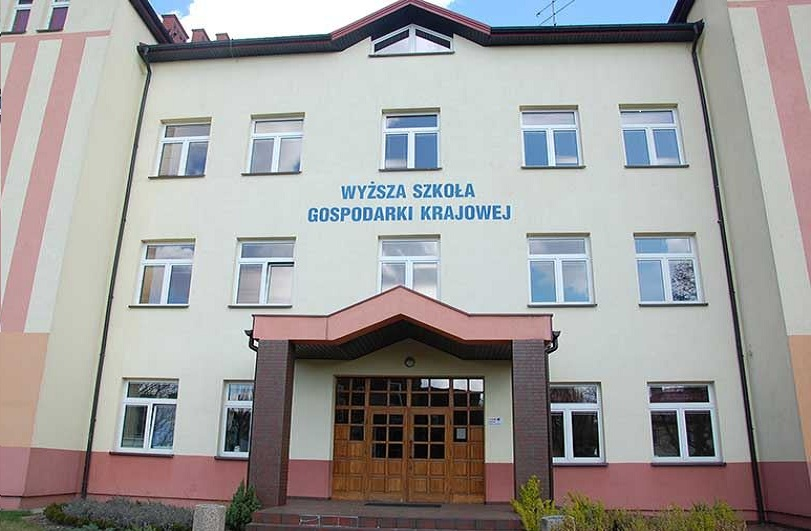
Higher School of National Economy in Kutno

Higher education

- Higher School of National Economy in Kutno
- Commuting didactic facility of Łódź University Economic – Sociological department
- Commuting facility of High schools of social skills – Law department (master's studies)

Art schools

- K.Kurpiński National Music School of Ist and IInd degree

== Communions ==
Pastoral services are provided by the following churches:

- Roman Catholic church
- Lutheran church
- Pentecost church
- Christian church "Jesus lives"
- Seventh-day Adventist Church

== Culture ==
=== Events ===
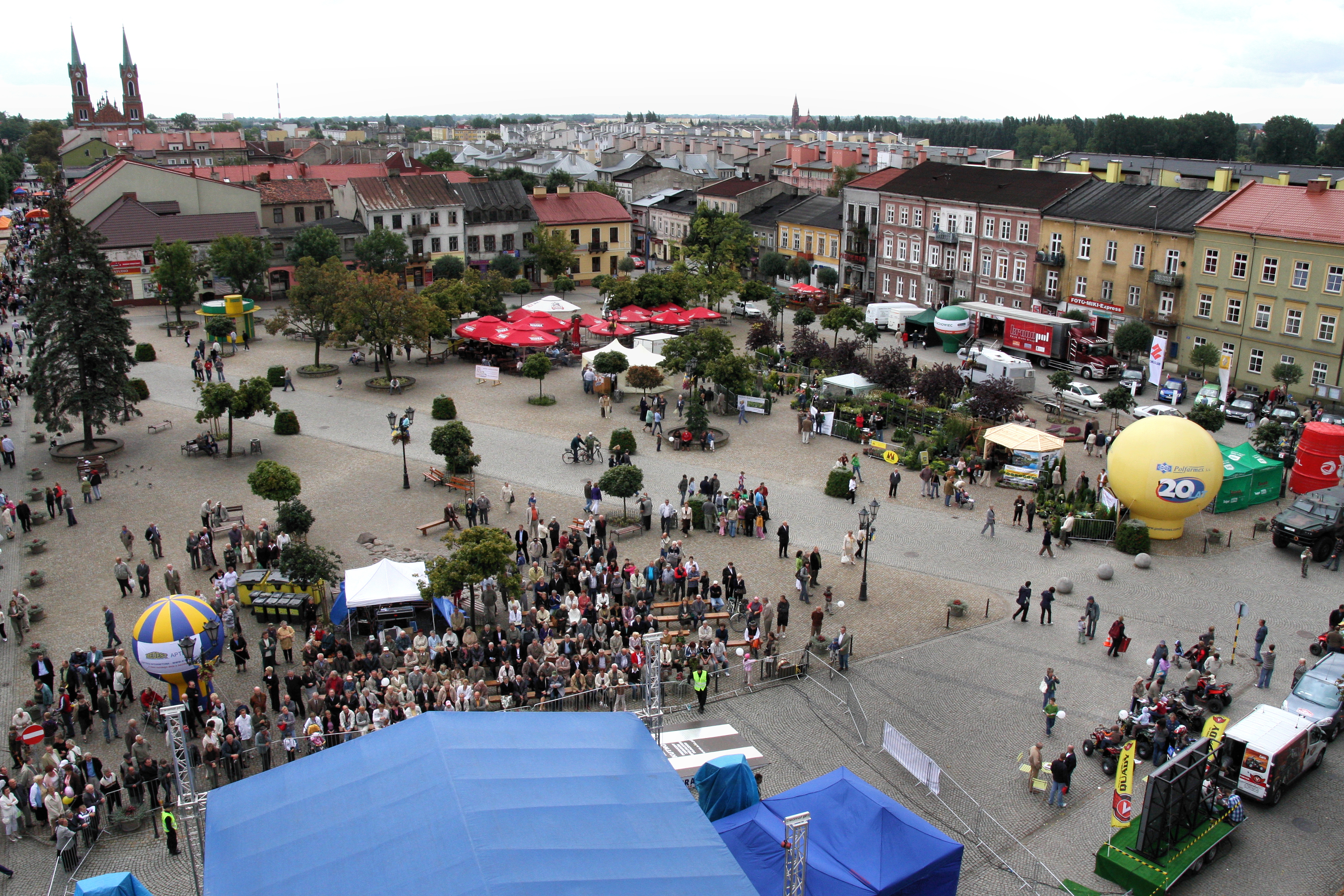
Kutno Rose Festival in 2009

- The Rose Festival – a cultural event organized by Kutno House of Culture. It was held for the first time from 20 to 21 September 1975 as Kutno's Roses Fair. Main element of this event is exhibition of roses that comes from different Kutno growers along with performances of music bands (mostly folk bands), exhibition of the local artist and trade stalls. Since 1990 name of the festival has been changed to The Rose Festival (Święto Róży) along with its theme. Exhibition of roses has been extended with arts and set design arrangements.
- Kutno Station – Nationalwide Competition of Honorable Songs of Kutno District Governor – Jeremi Przybora. For the first time, took place in 2005.
- Szalom Asz Festival – A nationwide contest that is held once every two years. Jewish music, photographic exhibitions and film screenings also are immanent part of the festival.

== Sport ==
Kutno is the seat of the European Little League Baseball Center. In 1984, Juan Echevarria Motola, a Cuban living in Kutno, started teaching baseball to groups of young people. Therefore, a baseball section of "Stal Kutno" club was created. It is the biggest youth center of baseball in Europe. The European Baseball Championship is hosted annually in various age categories. The complex consists of two lighted stadiums that have enough space to hold up to two thousand spectators named for Edward Piszka and Stan Musial. The complex also includes three training fields and a dormitory for over 200 players.

Sports club City Stadium in Kutno on Tadeusz Kościuszki St. is named by Henryk Reyman.

=== Sports clubs ===
- KS Kutno – Football, currently in third league, founded in 2014.
- KKS Kutno – basketball, currently Polish Basketball League.
- Tytan Kutno – rugby club founded in 2009
- Stal Kutno – baseball club, first league
- Stal Kutno II – Baseball club, second league

== International cooperation ==
Kutno cooperates with various cities and regions in Europe. For instance with Bat Yam city in Israel (Szalom Asz festival connects both towns). Thanks to Commune Association of Kutno Region town maintains relationship with the English county Northumberland.

== Transport ==
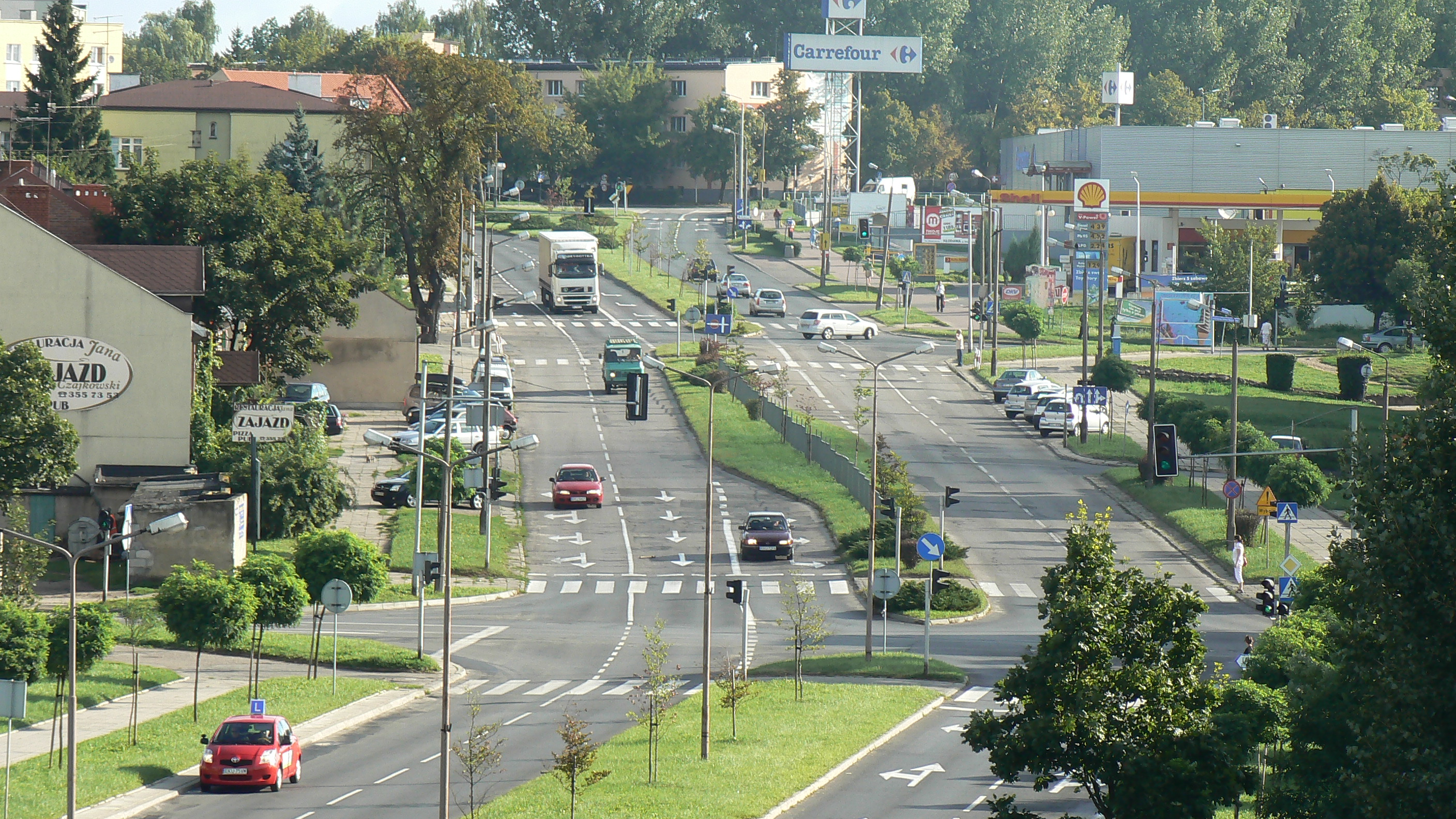
Aleje Papieża Jana Pawła II ("Pope John Paul II Avenues")

Kutno is an important communication junction in Central Europe. Two main roads lead through town: national road No. 92 (former road No. 2) connecting Miedzichowo near Nowy Tomyśl with Łowicz and Warsaw; national road No. 60 connecting Kutno with Płock and Ostrów Mazowiecka national road which is the transit corridor for trucks, leading from the Baltic states to Germany. Both roads leading through town are bypassed which helps transport though country and to reduce traffic in the town.

Fourteen kilometers (8.7 miles) from Kutno is Krośniewice. This is where the junction of roads nr 91 and 92 is situated.

Beside country roads through Kutno leads a system of Province and District roads connecting town with Łódź and other nearby towns.

The A1 motorway which opened to traffic in November 2012 has greatly improved the importance of the town in road transportation. Kutno is served by two exits from the A1 motorway (Kutno North, 7 km (4 miles) from the town and Kutno East, 2 km (1 mile) from the town).

=== List of country and province roads in Kutno ===
- country road nr 60: Łęczyca – Kutno – Płock – Ostrów Mazowiecka
- country road nr 92: Miedzichowo – Poznań – Konin – Kutno – Łowicz
- province road nr 702: Kutno – Piątek – Zgierz

=== Railway ===
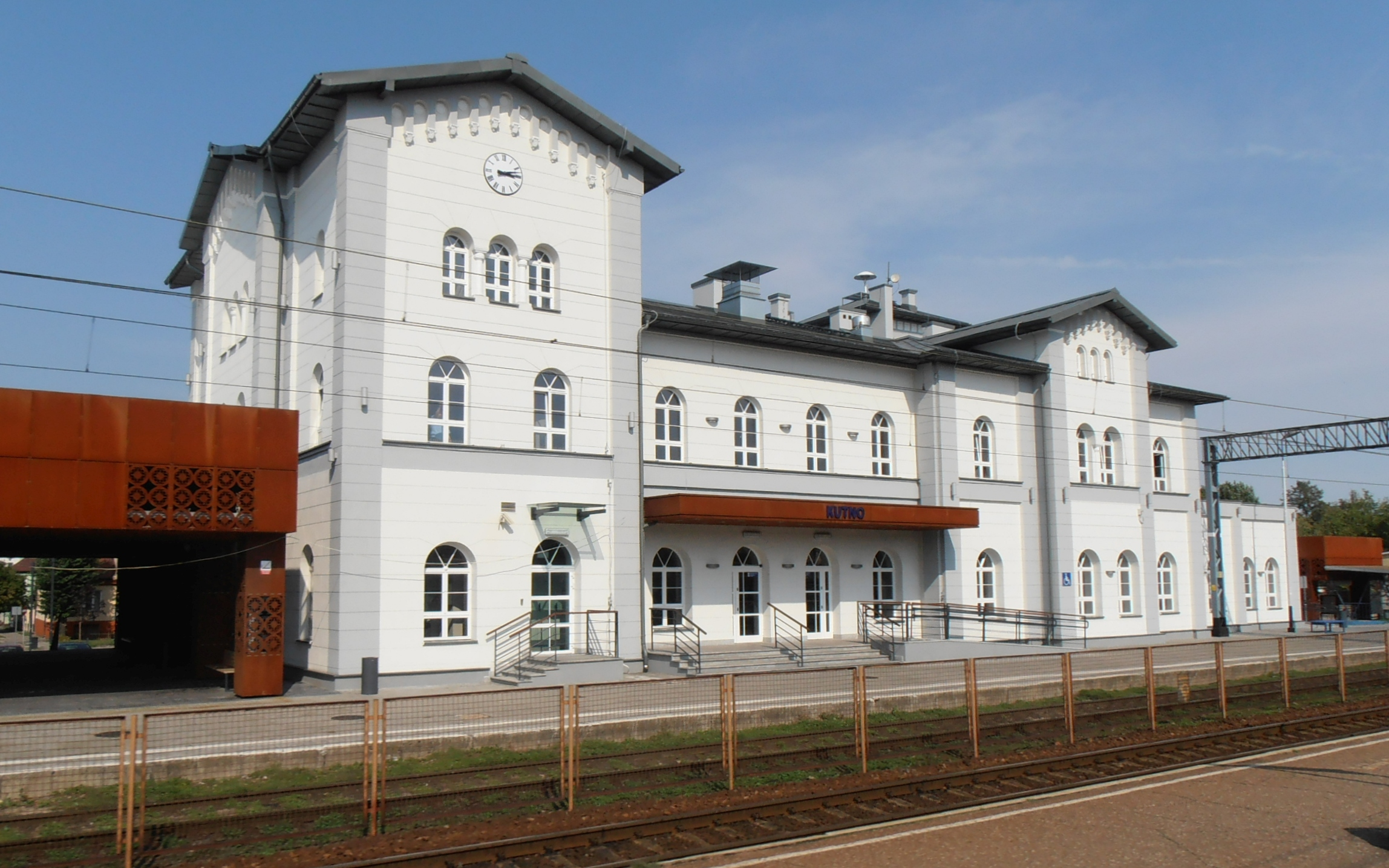
Kutno train station

Kutno is served by the Kutno railway station. Kutno has been an important railway hub in Poland since the 19th Century. The railways enjoyed its greatest development in the 1920s and 1930s.

The history of rail in Kutno dates from 1861. Intensive railway development started during the interwar period. Between 1922 and 1926, the connection linking Kutno with Poznań (thereby construction of Warsaw - Poznań railway) was completed and Łódź with Płock was finished. During the postwar period, the current platform and underground passage was constructed.

One can now travel by train from Kutno to most of the big cities in Poland (Warsaw, Łódź, Bydgoszcz, Szczecin, Poznań, Wrocław, Katowice, Kraków, Lublin) and also to various tourism centers (Kołobrzeg, Krynica-Zdrój, Hel, Zakopane).

== Bus service ==
PKS Kutno enables coach connection with neighbouring localities for which Kutno is the administrative and regional center. There are also possible regional connections to Łódź and Płock.

Municipal Transportation Company serves Kutno inhabitants around town and its closest surroundings. The 13-day bus line and one marked "N" (night bus) route through Kutno. Remaining lines with numbers from 5 to 16 service the city area and also route to neighbouring areas.

There are also private carriers servicing line: Kutno – Piątek – Zgierz – Łódź

== Honorary citizens ==
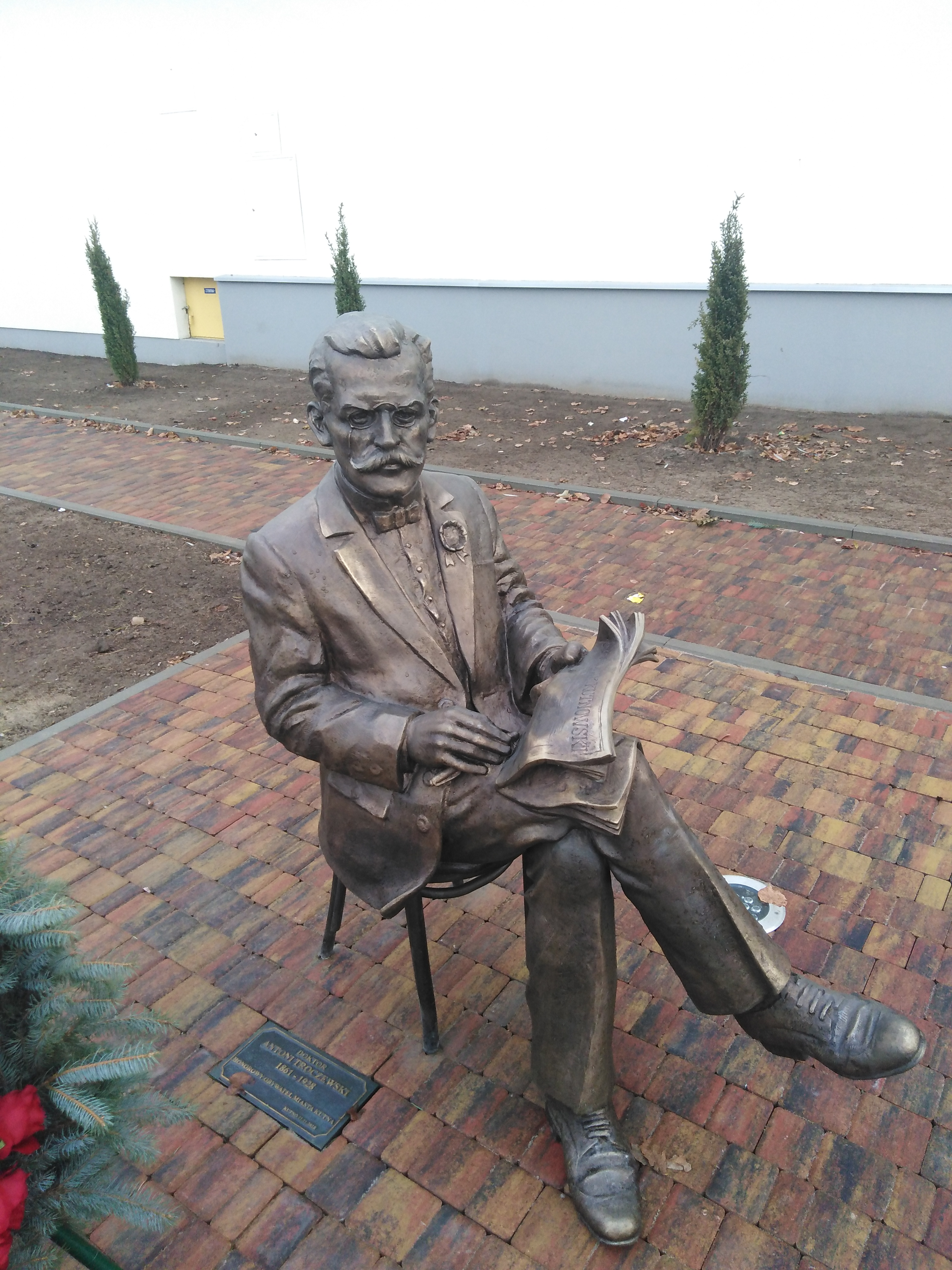
Antoni Troczewski memorial in Kutno

List of individuals granted with the Honorary citizen title by the City council

- Edward John Piszek
- Stanley Frank Musial
- Eugeniusz Filipowicz
- PhD Antoni Troczewski
- Robert Sczcepanik

== Former names in the city ==
During the times of German occupation, the square at the center of Kutno (nowadays Marshal Józef Piłsudski square) was named Adolf Hitler Platz, while Gabriel Narutowicz St. was named Hindenburg Strase.

During the times of People's Republic of Poland, Piłsudski square was named Józef Stalin square. After his death, the name of the square was changed to 19 January Square (the date related to the liberation of Kutno by the Red Army).

Former names of the streets in Kutno:

- nowadays cardinal Stefan Wyszyński st – former General Karol Świerczewski (before war Szosowa St.),
- nowadays Wilcza St. – former Hanki Sawickiej St.
- nowadays Maria Skłodowska-Curie St. – former Głogowiecka St.
- nowadays Peowiacka St. – former Mariana Buczka St.
- nowadays Augustyn Kordecki – former Marcin Kasprzak St.
- nowadays General Władysław Sikorski – former General Siemiona Kriwoszeina St.
- nowadays General Władysław Anders – former Feliks Dzierżyński St.

== Legends ==
According to a widespread story, Kutno was supposed to have been founded by Count Piotr from Kutná Hora, who had escaped in 997 with the brother of Bishop Adalbert from Bohemia to Poland. Kutno, the town, was founded as an heirloom of a family estate.

J. Łukawski, the publisher of Liber beneficiorum by J. Ławski, placed a footnote on page 478, with the following account: "When Piotr of Kutno came to Poland in the year 997, he founded Kutno in memory of his manor house in the Bohemia. The parish church was founded along with the settlement. Piotr's ancestors designated themselves as the Counts of Kutno and later assumed the name of Kucieńscy".

However, this story is not considered to be reliable and is rejected by most historians due to its doubtful origin. It is treated as an 18th-century legend or possibly a varnished version of the origins some "noble" families. The geographic dictionary of Polish Kingdom, commonly known as "Kąty", gives the impression that Kutno could have been named "Kątno" originally.

The source of this legend is likely because of the similarities between names Kutno and Kutná Hora. First references to Kutná Hora were made in 1289, whereas about Kutno itself was not noted until 1301. In addition, in the 10th century Poles were not founding towns, as an equivalent. Instead, they had strongholds which were changed in the 13th century. The title of Count being used in Bohemia since 1627.
