= Kutno Rose Festival =

Flower exhibition in Poland

The Rose Festival is an annual exhibition of roses and florist arrangements which takes place in Kutno, Poland.

The event takes place according to tradition on the first (sometimes second) weekend of September. The first exhibition took place in 1974. The exhibition is accompanied by gardening and firms bazaars, fairs on area of the city and concerts. In 2009 the automobile Rally of the Rose had its premiere.

Roses and other flowers come from breeders of Łódź province while floristic arrangements are prepared by florists from Poland and elsewhere, for instance Russia, Latvia or Lithuania.

== Origins of the festival ==
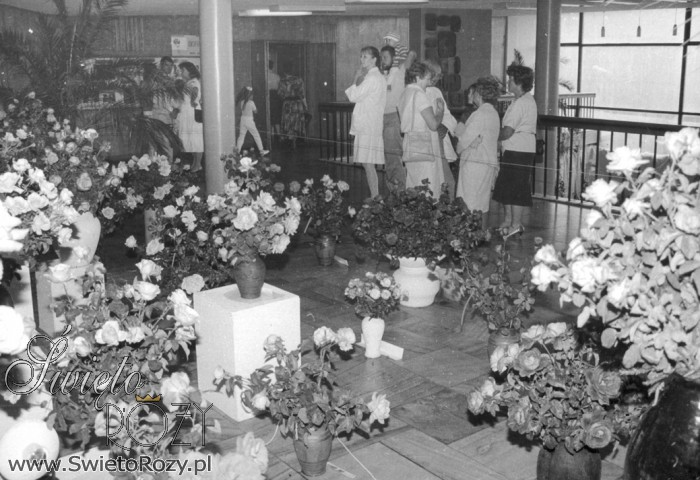
Origins of The Rose Festival

The Rose Festival for the first time was organised in 1975 from 20 to 21 September by Kutno House of Culture (Kazimierz Jóźwiak had the initiative) named Kutno Rose Fair. During the event, rose exhibitions and handicrafts of Kutno artists were presented along with performances of folk instrumental music bands and solo performers.

At first, the Kutno Rose Fair had no sponsorship; florists presented their exhibitions for free, bands performed for the proverbial "meal" in other words it was a festival cost-free event. In 1990 the name of the event was changed and the formula of the festival was enriched by broader artistic arrangements.

== The Rose Festival nowadays ==
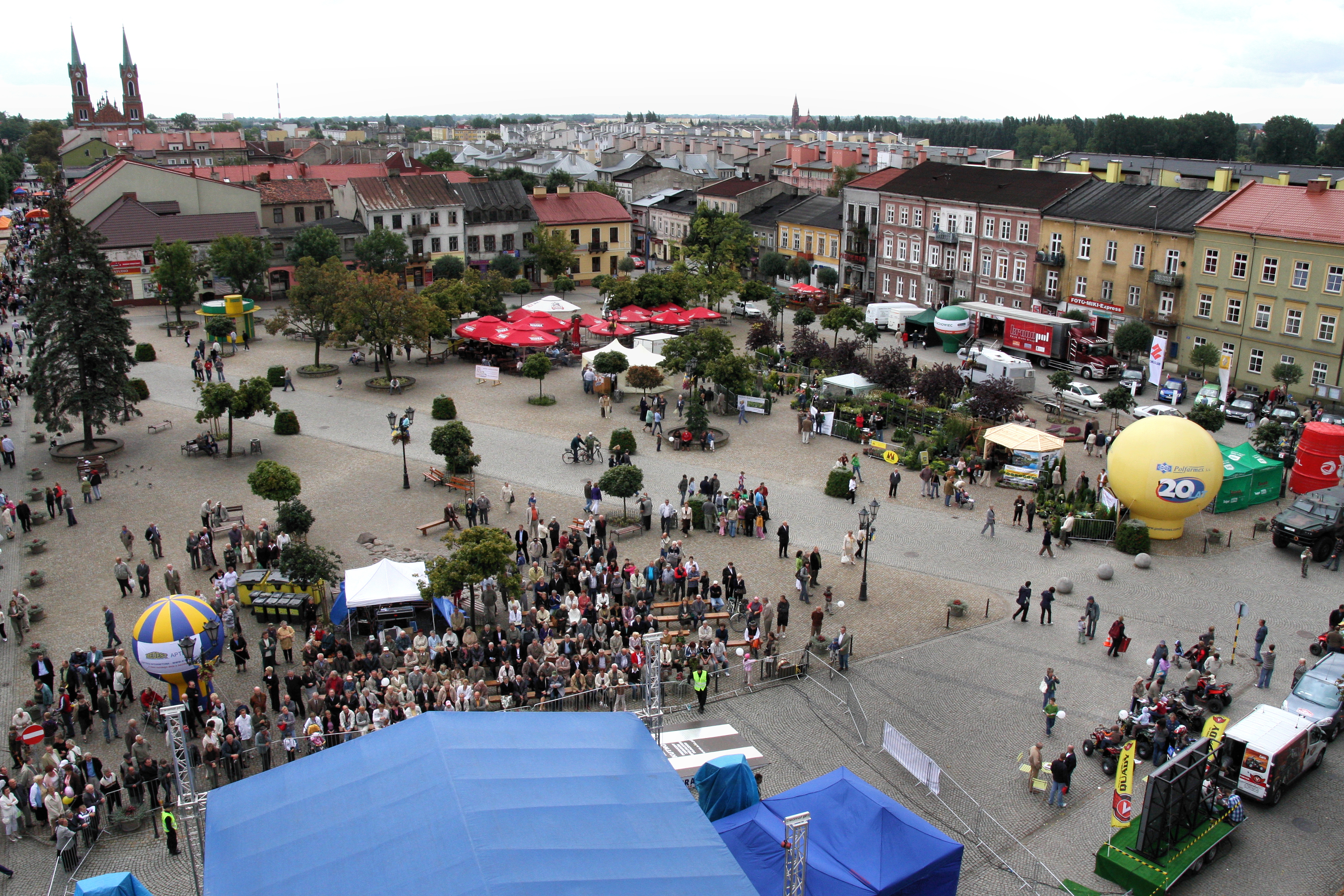
Józef Piłsudski square in Kutno during The Rose Festival in 2009

Since 1990, the biggest artistic/entertainment/cultural event in Kutno is organised under a different name and progressively improving form. On the Rose Festival annually organised on the beginning of September, many concerts of both Polish and foreign music stars take place (for instance: Dżem, Myslovitz or Bad Boys Blue).

Moreover, the Rose Festival consists mainly of exhibitions of rose compositions and events related to the rose topic. The festival is very popular amongst Kutno inhabitants, people who visit Kutno or everyone who wants to spend their time pleasantly.

=== Concerts ===
An important and inseparable part of The Rose Festival are the concerts of groups playing folk and popular music. Their performances are free and thanks to that gathers publicity from the whole Kutno region. Their diverse styles attract various kinds of audiences.

=== Rose exhibitions and artistic arrangements ===
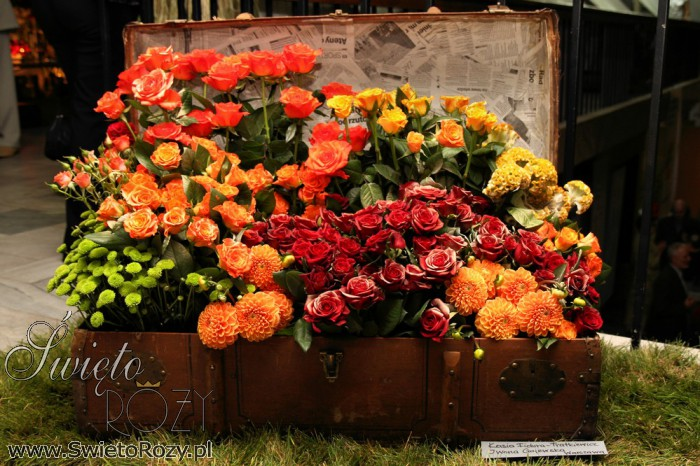
Floristic arrangement during 35th Opening of The Rose Festival in 2009

For 35 years Kutno has been associated with the rose exhibitions (delivered by the local breeders) prepared by florists of Kutno, Poland region as well as the whole world. The form of the arrangements has been changing since the festival beginnings.

Originally they were exhibitions of simple flower bouquet (of various kinds of roses) but with time, the form evolved into more plastic arrangement projects which had led into the current open form of extended artistic installations. Annual exhibitions are presented in a free form of interpretation but with an earlier set main theme. Themes of particular festival editions are: "33 Rose Arts/33 Roses" (33 Sztuki Róż) in 2007, "Garden of poetry" (Ogród Poezji) in 2008, "Treasures of the Queen" (Skarby Królowej) in 2009.

Exhibitions are created by such great artists of floristics like Druvis and Inge Ciritis from Latvia, Agnieszka Bogusz from Kraków|Crokow or Marek Melerski. Flower exhibitions are supplemented by folk artists handicraft of works that interprets modern art with flower (or rose itself) related topics.

=== Rally of The Rose ===
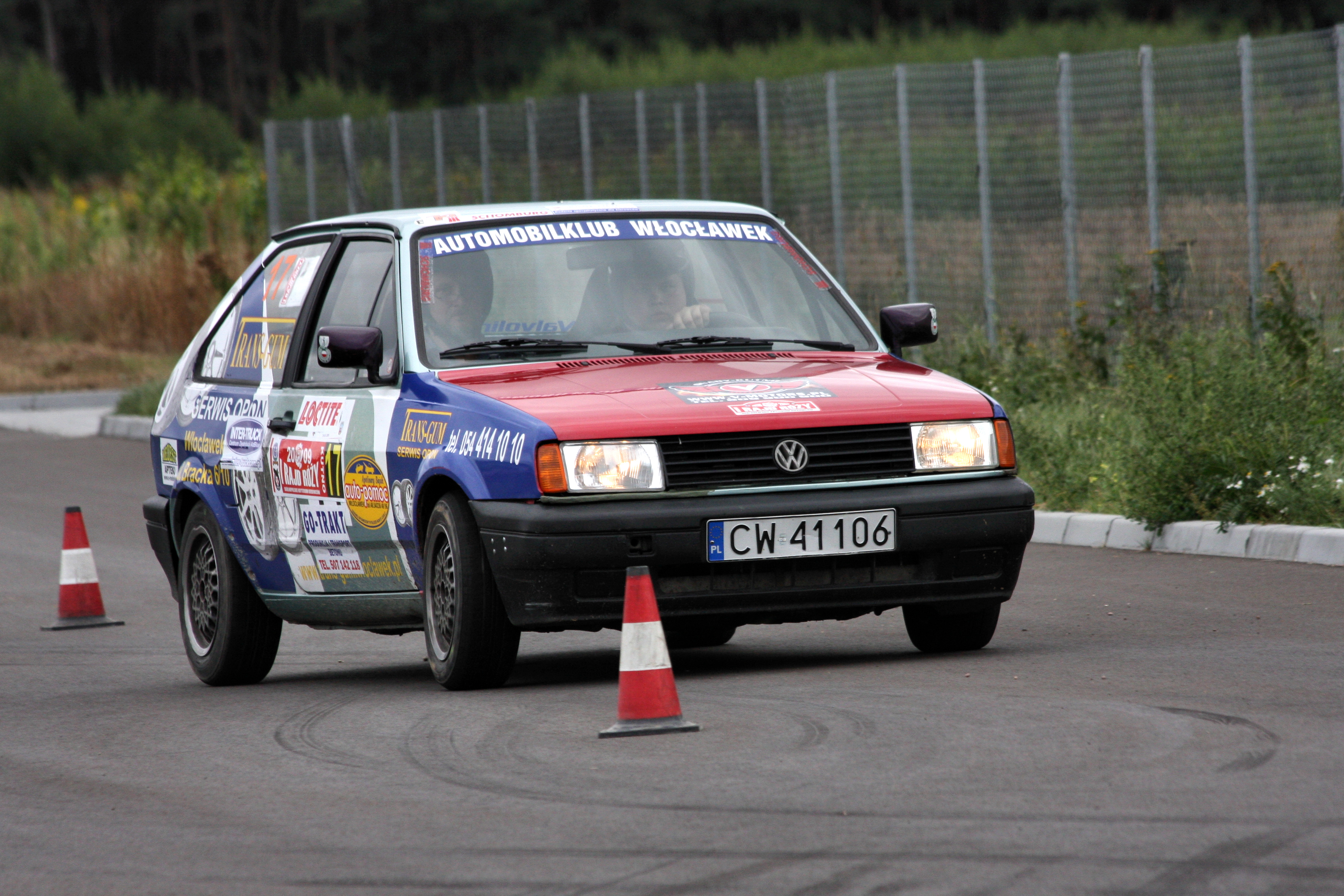
Rally of The Rose in Kutno

Initiated for the first time in 2009, the rally has a 60 kilometers long route which begins on the Pope John Paul II st. and lead through the Kutno industry zone to end at the city center. Every car driver can take part in the rally (number of crews had been limited to 50). However, cars with valid car inspection and OC+NNW insurance are required. Second edition of the event is planned to take place on The Rose Festival in 2010.

== Chronology ==
=== 33rd Rose Festival in 2007 ===
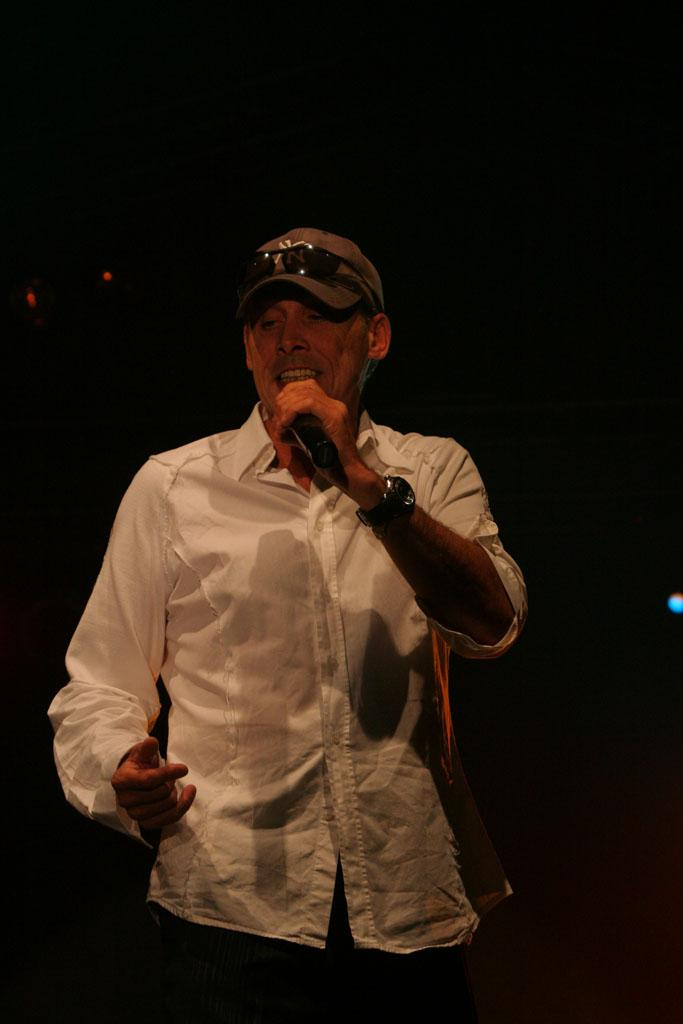
John McInerney (Bad Boys Blue) performance on The Rose Festival in 2007

Took place from 7 to 9 September 2007 and traditionally main part of the event was 33rd Exhibition of flowers and decorative plants named: ""33 roses/rose arts"" on which amongst others Bogdan Ziętek, Marijus Gvildys presented their artistic interpretation of Andy Warhol, Maurits Cornelis Escher or Vincent van Gogh works. Festival program anticipated live performances of well-known Polish and foreign bands like Pidżama Porno Dżem or Bad Boys Blue.

=== 34th Rose Festival in 2008 ===
Took place from 12 to 14 September 2008 (exceptionally second weekend of the month), festival program anticipated: 34th Rose and Floristic Arrangements named "Garden of Poetry". Exhibition theme made lower hall of Kutno House of Culture filled with various floral-artistic interpretations of lyric called "W pracowni" (In the workshop) by Zbigniew Herbert. Installations executives amongst others were Janina Kwapisz from Łódź (a florist), Iwona Gajewska and Kasia Fidura-Tratkiewicz (florists) from Warsaw or Artur Śledzianowski (plastic) from Poznań.

Part of festival were also musical performances of Kutno Land's Song and Dance band and celebrities of Polish popular music: Wilki band and Monika Brodka.

=== 35th Rose Festival in 2009 ===
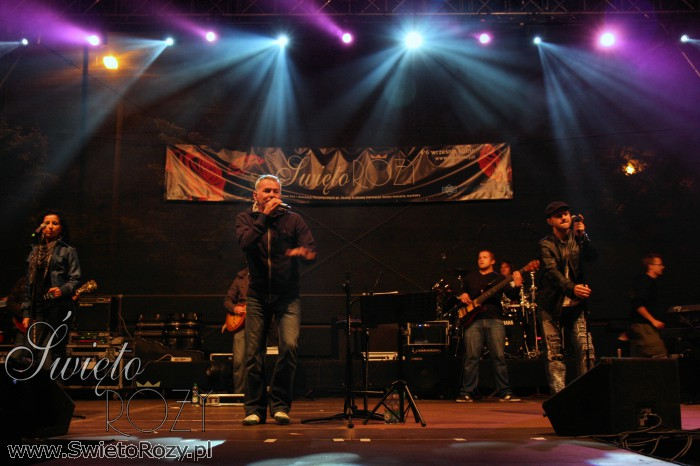
Robert Janowski performance on The Rose Festival in 2009

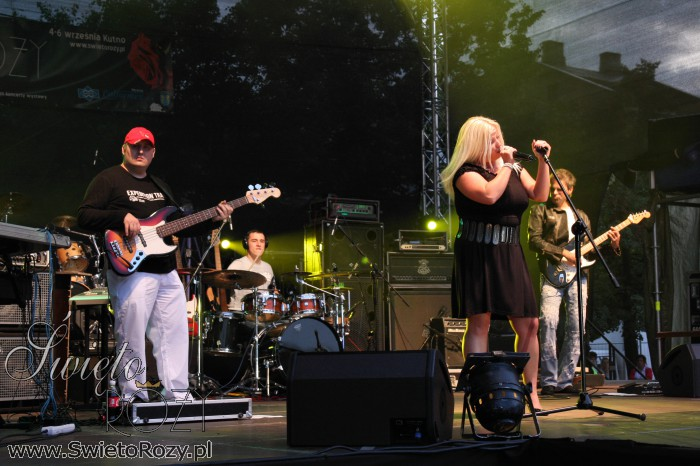
Ysia and Friends during The Rose Festival in 2009

Took place from 4 to 6 September 2009, festival program anticipated:

35th Exhibitions of Roses and Floristic arrangements named "Treasures of the Queen": theme of the expo had given large field of interpretation, so that installations created by artists like Druvis and Inga Ciritis from Latvia, Anna Nizińska, Katarzyna Fidura- Tratkiewicz, Iwona Gajewska or Marek Melerski had diverse ideas. Framework of the festival also complied performances of such Polish celebrities like Bajm, Majka Jeżowska, Afromental or Robert Janowski.

Fair took place on main streets of the city, Piłsudski square, Królewska st. and traditionally on Romuald Traugutt park and Kutno House of Culture. In the framework of festival first edition of The Rally of Rose which was one of the round of Bydgoszcz Car Rally Championship of Amateur Drivers. Rally was organised by Agency of Kutno Trade Development on commission and with the cooperation of Kutno City Hall.

=== 36th Rose Festival in 2010 ===
Festival program consisted of

- 36th Exhibition of roses and flower arrangements in Regional Museum (Marshall Józef Piłsudski square which was opened with live performance of Dorota Miśkiewicz with band called "A Girl with a Rose" ("Dziewczyna z różą") in "Magnolia" restaurant.
- Amusement park - biggest amusement park (with a roller coaster) that ever visited Kutno was located at Wolności square. Lunapark among other things consisted of Ferris wheel, huge propeller kind of attraction called Extreme or the Catapult. For younger participants of The Rose Festival the Kinder Carousel, inflatable castle of slides was provided.
- The Rose Fair - trade and gastronomy fair was locates in the city center at Marshall J.Piłsudski square, Królewska st, Wolności square and Zamenhofa st
- music part of the festival mainly consisted of live performances of Kult and Budka Suflera
