= 6 Sierpnia Street, Łódź =

Street in Łódź, Poland

6 Sierpnia Street
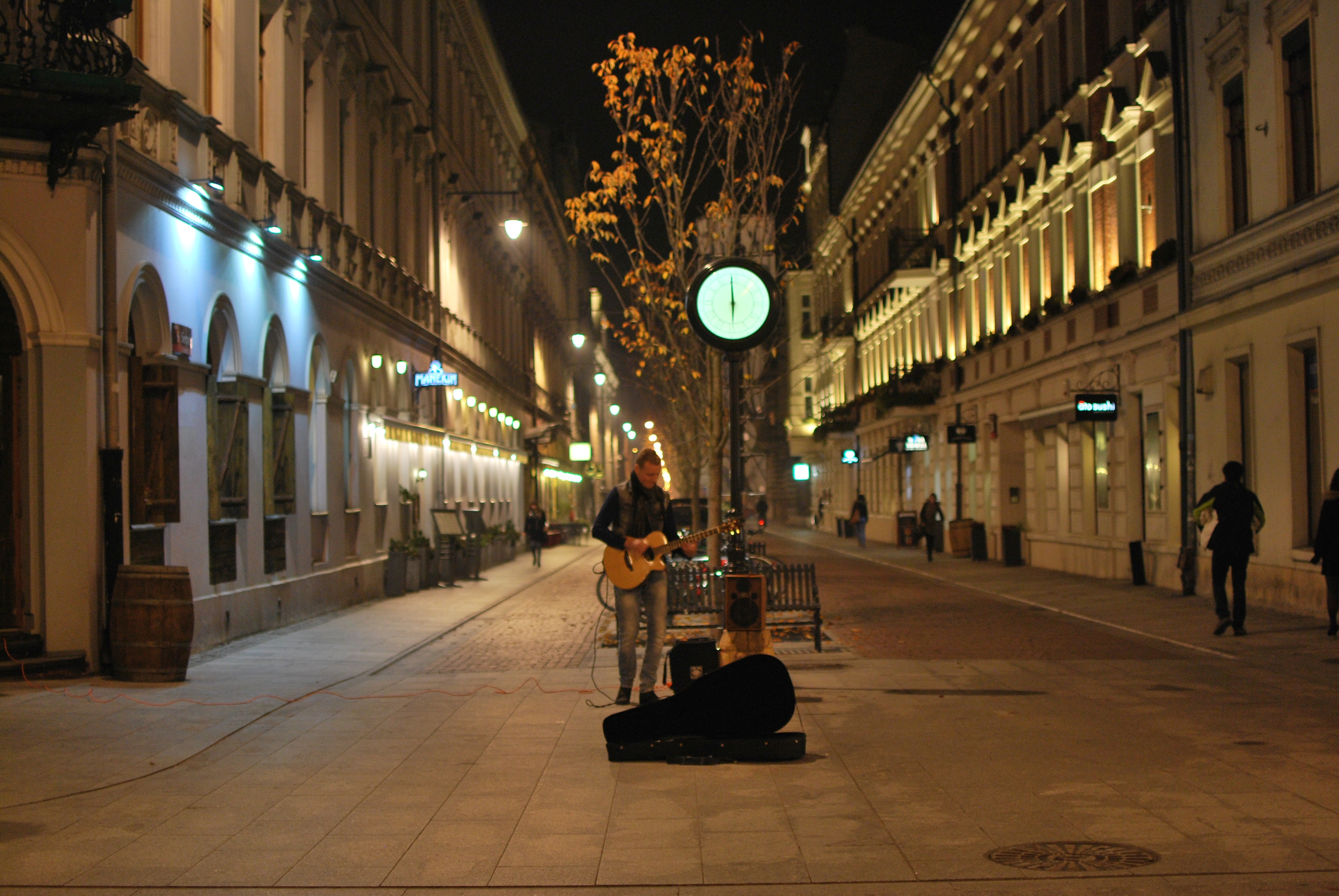
- Beginning of 6 Sierpnia Street – view from the intersection with Piotrowska Street (2015)

- Location within Poland
- Part of: City Center, Stare Polesie
- Length: 2 km (1.2 mi)
- Location: Łódź
- Coordinates: 51°46′07.4″N 19°27′22.8″E

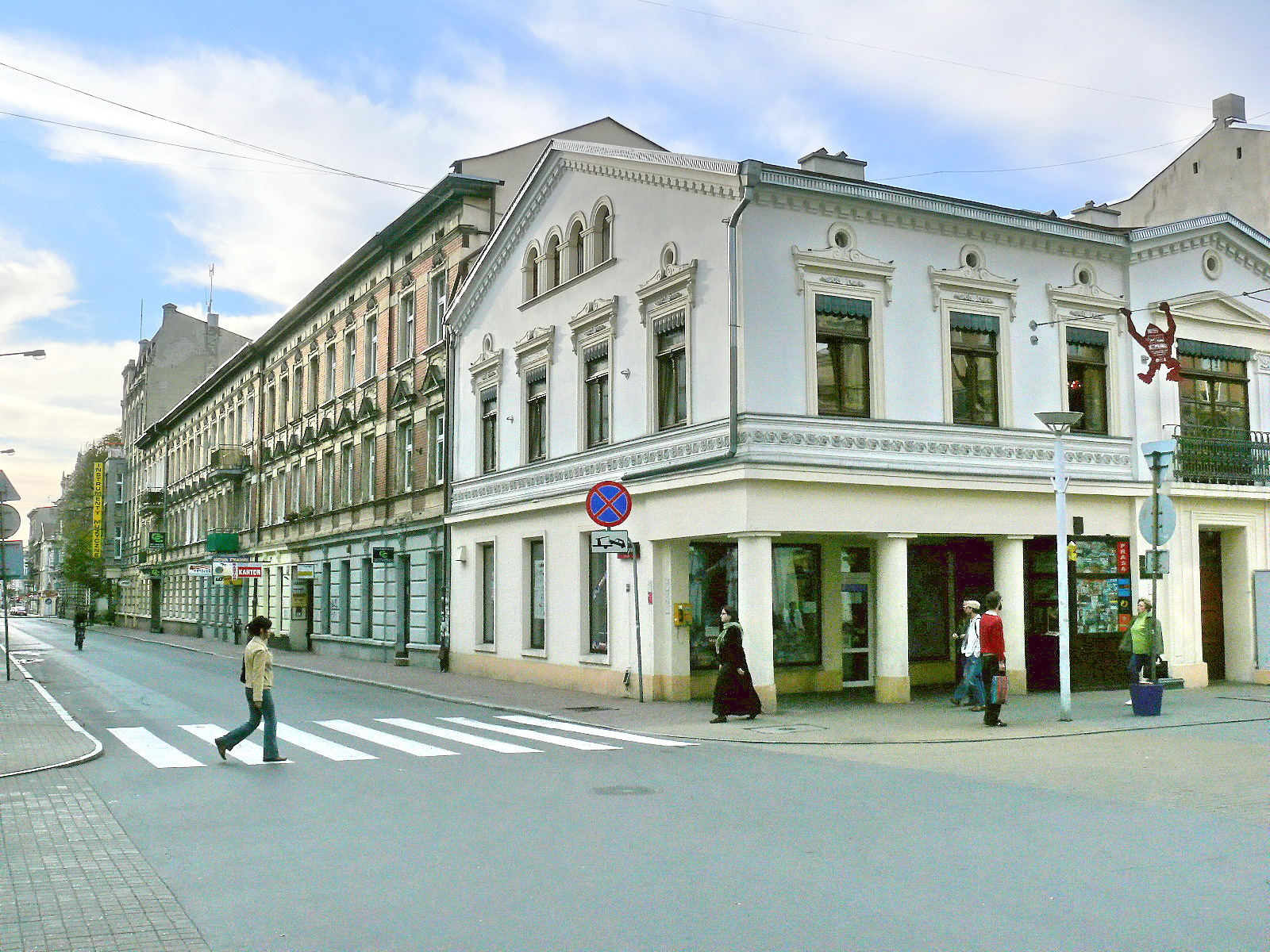
The initial section of 6 Sierpnia Street (the odd side visible) before it was turned into a city courtyard (September 2007)

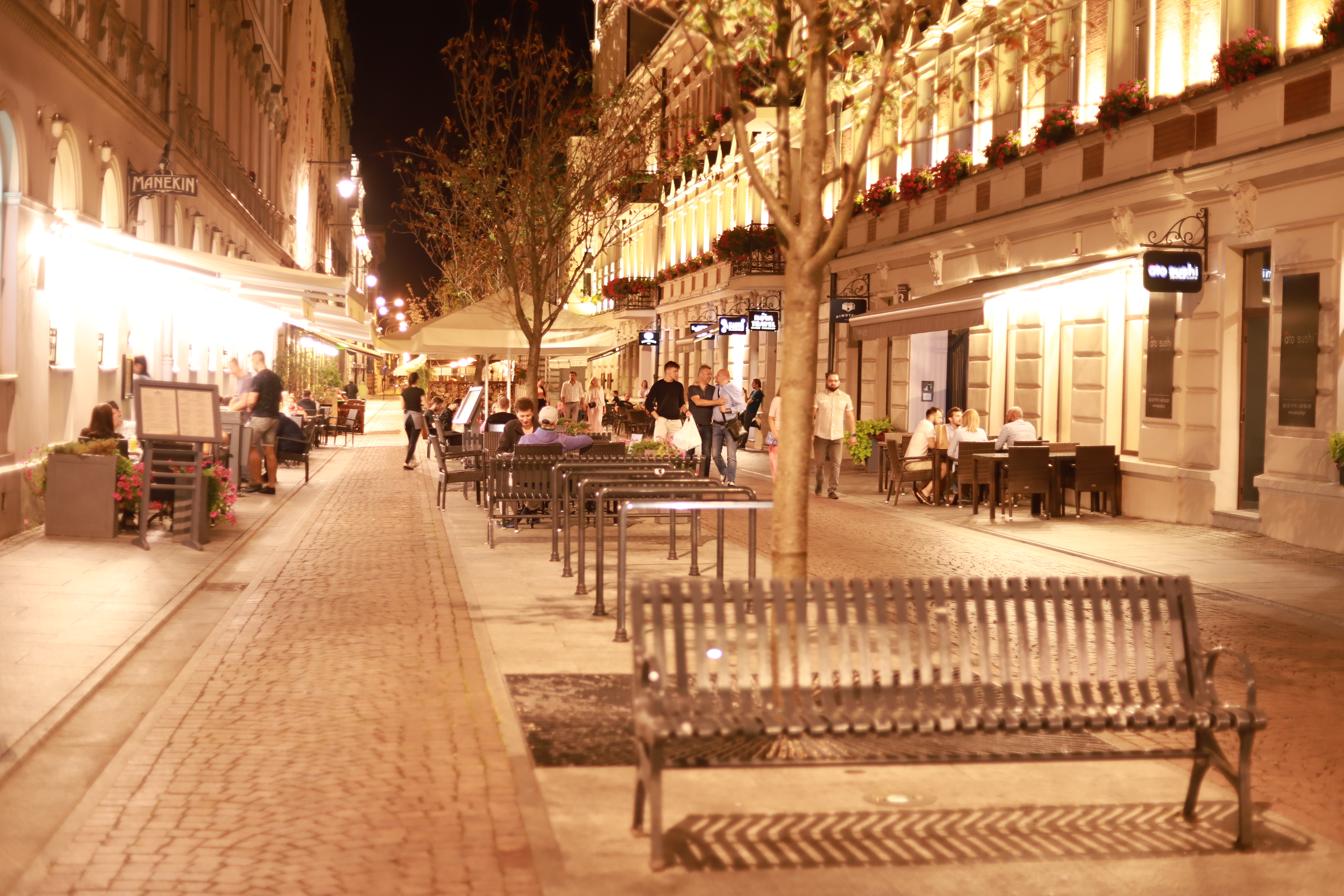
Initial section of 6 Sierpnia street – city courtyard (August 2018)

6 Sierpnia Street is located in the western part of the Śródmieście district (City Center) and the eastern part of the Polesie district (Stare Polesie) in Łódź, with a length of approximately 2 km (1.2 mi). It starts at the intersection with Piotrkowska Street and runs almost parallel to the equator to the intersection with Lucjan Żeligowski Street, and then southwest to the intersection with Włókniarzy Avenue. Its eastern extension, across Piotrkowska Street, is Romuald Traugutt Street. The name of the street commemorates the date of the departure of the First Cadre Company in 1914.

The street is divided into two sections by the dual carriageway of Tadeusz Kościuszko Avenue – neither straight passage nor left turns are possible (the barrier is a separated tram track), and only pedestrian crossing is allowed on the southern side of the intersection. The initial section, less than 300 m long, up to the intersection with Wólczańska Street, is located in the city center and in the historical-tourist zone of the city, while the remaining part is in Stare Polesie. The first section of the street – between Piotrkowska Street and Tadeusz Kościuszko Avenue – is designated as a traffic-calmed zone, and since the end of June 2014, it has been a city courtyard (Dutch: woonerf) and since 1 January 2015 has had the status of an internal road. (Note: Until 31 December 2014, this section had the status of a county road, like the rest of the street. The status was downgraded by Resolution No. XCIII/1967/14 of the Łódź City Council on 24 September 2014 due to the transformation of this section of the street into a woonerf (urban courtyard).) The remaining part – from Tadeusz Kościuszko Avenue to the end – has the status of a county road (No. 1126E).

Since 5 August 2022, two-way traffic has been in effect along almost the entire length of the street, except for the section between Piotrkowska Street and Tadeusz Kościuszko Avenue, where traffic is one-way eastbound, opposite to the direction of property numbering.

The initial part of the street (properties with odd numbers from 1 to 9 and even numbers from 2 to 20) belongs to the Roman Catholic Parish of the Exaltation of the Holy Cross, the next part on the even side (properties with numbers from 22 to 98) belongs to the Roman Catholic Parish of Our Lady of Victory, and the odd side (properties with numbers from 13 to 71) belongs to the Roman Catholic Parish of St. Matthew the Apostle.

== History ==
=== Until 1918 ===
The initial section of 6 Sierpnia Street – from Piotrkowska Street, likely to Wólczańska Street – was laid out in the mid-1820s during the development of the Łódka flax-cotton settlement. The name Krótka Street was commonly used but not an official designation and referred to both this section and the cross street on the other side of Piotrkowska Street, now known as Romuald Traugutt Street. It was not until 1863 that the city council standardized street names, assigning official names to those that previously lacked them. The council adopted the principle that cross streets of Piotrkowska Street would have separate names on either side of it; thus, the section of Krótka Street extending west from Piotrkowska was officially named Benedykta Street, (Note: In some sources, the name St. Benedykta Street is used in reference to the period before World War I. However, the first part of the name was officially added only in 1918, after Poland regained independence.) while the section extending east retained the name Krótka. Dariusz Kędzierski, a Łódź publicist and filmmaker, mentions a dispute over the patron of the street (Note: He cites the year 1861, which seems to be incorrect, given the previously mentioned fact that the street naming was organized only in 1863.) – whether it was intended to honor Benedict of Nursia or Benedyk Tykel, a co-founder of industrial Łódź – considering the second option unlikely.

The street was gradually extended, and by the 1870s, it ended near Wiązowy Market (later Green Market, now Norbert Barlicki Square), before the planned Pańska Street (now Stefan Żeromski Street). In 1870, two corner tenement houses were built at the intersection with Piotrkowska Street (at No. 1/3 and 63 Piotrkowska Street). These were erected by Karol Kretschmer, who owned a handkerchief weaving mill there since 1857, one of the oldest factories in Łódź. Most of the parcels on the north side of the street belonged to him. That same year, a corner building at No. 2 and 65 Piotrkowska Street was constructed, where Szaja Rosenblatt opened a wool spinning mill three years later.

In 1880, a wool spinning mill building was erected at 15 Benedykta Street by Henryk Feder and Jakub Vivey. The factory operated until the early 1920s, closing due to bankruptcy.

The ongoing development of the district known as Wiązowa around 1880 led to the further extension of Benedykta Street westward, and beyond the then-planned Leszno vel Leśna Street (now Lucjan Żeligowski Street), southwest to the line of the city forest running between today's properties numbered 102 and 104. The characteristic oblique layout of parcel boundaries and building lines along the NE–SW axis, inconsistent with the rectangular street grid that formed the district's basic plan, aligned with the former layout of the agricultural town's fields. The sharp bend in Benedykta Street's route (as well as several others) from nearly parallel to the equator to southwest beyond Leszno vel Leśna was due to the streets being laid out along the paths of old field boundaries. Between the 1880s and 1890s, due to cramped development and water supply issues, Karol Kretschmer relocated the handkerchief weaving mill to a plot on Milsch Road (now 62 Mikołaj Kopernik Street), and on the vacated plot at No. 5 began constructing an eclectic tenement house, which became his residence in 1896.

On 24 September 1889, Edward Szolz vel Scholtz's (Note: The Łodzianin. Kalendarz Informacyjno-Adresowy na rok 1897 lists Edward Szolc as the owner of the property, while Henryk Scholz is noted as the owner of the spinning mill.) steam wool spinning mill at No. 72 (later Nos. 72 and 74, formerly Nos. 795ii and 795kk) was completely destroyed by fire. The factory, which employed over 50 workers, had existed since 1881. The fire started in the room housing the picker and within about an hour engulfed the entire factory. The losses were estimated at over 50,000 rubles. The owner obtained permission to rebuild the spinning mill before the end of the year.

In early autumn 1889, an underground gas pipeline was laid on the section of Benedykta Street between Wólczańska and Długa streets (now Gdańska Street), and a year later this part of the street was illuminated by gas lamps.

In 1895, at 1 Benedykta Street, Zygmunt Bartkiewicz founded the first Artistic Salon in Łódź, where exhibitions of paintings by both established artists (including Józef Chełmoński, Julian Fałat, Juliusz Kossak, Władysław Podkowiński, and Henryk Siemiradzki) and aspiring artists (including Samuel Hirszenberg and Leopold Pilichowski) were presented. The first exhibition of pure applied art was opened on December 3. A significant achievement of the institution was the 1898 charity art exhibition, whose catalog included works by 94 artists (220 paintings, 24 sculptures and bronzes, and architectural drawings by 6 architects). The salon existed there until early 1899 when it moved to 3 Zawadzka Street (now Adam Próchnik Street).

At this time, between the late 19th and early 20th centuries, the Russian State Bank purchased a corner plot at 6 Benedykta Street and 14 Spacerowa vel Promenada Street (now Tadeusz Kościuszko Avenue) from the Rosenblatt spouses for 242,500 rubles, intending to build its headquarters there. In a competition announced in 1901, Dawid Lande's design was chosen. The bank building was erected between 1905 and 1908.

The construction of the Warsaw–Kalisz Railway line in 1900 determined the final length of Benedykta Street. The approved final route of the line brought it as close to the city as possible – planning its course along the eastern boundary of the city forest and requiring the construction of four railway viaducts: over Konstantynowska Road (now Konstantynowska Street) and over Benedykta, Andrzeja (now Andrzej Struga Street), and Karolewska Streets. However, for cost-saving reasons, the construction of viaducts over Benedykta and Andrzeja Streets was abandoned, and the built railway line became the ultimate barrier limiting the length of both streets.

Before World War I, Benedykta Street was an unpaved road. Between 1915 and 1916, the section from Promenade (now Tadeusz Kościuszko Avenue) to Spinnlinie (now Wólczańska Street) was paved, and between 1916 and 1917, the section from Leschnostraße (now Lucjan Żeligowski Street) toward Łódź Kaliska railway station was paved. From 1915 to 1918, the occupying Germans introduced German names – Benedykta Street became Benediktstraße. The building of the former Russian State Bank was occupied by the German occupation administration. After the German troops were driven out of Łódź, the Military Command of the city, commanded by Captain Alfred Biłyk, took over the building at 6 Benedykta Street.

=== From 1918 to 1945 ===
After the war ended in 1918, the street was again given the Polish name Benedykta Street, but this name only lasted for a year. At a ceremonial session of the city council convened on 6 August 1919 in the assembly hall of the building at 16 Średnia Street (now Pomorska Street) (Note: Originally, the building served as the seat of a female high school; it is now home to the Emilia Sczaniecka IV High School. During the interwar period, the assembly hall was used for city council meetings, municipal employee gatherings, and state ceremonies and events.) to commemorate the 5th anniversary of the First Cadre Company's march from Kraków's Oleandry Street, the council members adopted by acclamation a resolution announcing the renaming of Benedykta Street to 6 Sierpnia Street, in honor of the march date. The change was likely made in mid-November 1919, as the city council minutes from November 4 still listed the street as Benedykta, while the Dziennik Zarządu m. Łodzi from November 25 referred to it by its new name.

In 1923, the bankrupt wool spinning mill of Feder and Vivego at 15 6 Sierpnia Street was purchased by the owners of the nearby Factory of Toilet Soaps and Cosmetics – Hugo Güttel and Józef Wójtowicz. Three years later, the company was renamed the Factory of Toilet Soaps and Cologne Józef Wójtowicz, Hugo Güttel and Co., and in 1929 it became the Hugo Güttel Soap and Cosmetics Factory Pixin.

On 9 April 1924, in the early hours of the morning, a fire broke out in the boiler room of Stefan Angerstein's spinning mill at number 17. The fire quickly spread, engulfing the entire three-story factory building. All Łódź fire departments fought the blaze – a total of 14 units. The operation was led by Karol Scheibler, deputy commander of the Volunteer Fire Brigade in Łódź. The fire was extinguished by early afternoon, but the factory was completely destroyed along with its equipment, goods, and raw materials, leaving 300 workers unemployed. During the firefighting efforts, the second floor's overheated ceiling collapsed, cutting off the escape route for 3 firefighters who subsequently died in the flames. (Note: Those who died in the fire were: Wawrzyniec Kamiński – Chief of the 5th Division of the Volunteer Fire Brigade in Łódź, born on 29 July 1876; he joined the brigade on 10 October 1899 and was awarded the medal for rescuing the endangered on 28 December 1923; Ludwik Bogus (also spelled Boguś) – axe-man, born on 25 June 1894 (the tombstone inscription states that he was born on 23 July 1894); he joined the brigade on 16 February 1914 and in 1924 he was proposed for the 10-year service badge; Klemens Wasserling – axe-man, born on 2 February 1897; he joined the brigade on 7 July 1922 and was awarded the Cross of Valour, 5th Class.) After a funeral service held on 12 April 1924 at the Łódź Cathedral by Bishop Wincenty Tymieniecki, they were buried in a common grave in the Catholic section of the Old Cemetery at 39 Ogrodowa Street. Shortly after, the grave was topped with a tombstone featuring 3 shattered columns, erected with contributions from the people of Łódź.

In the early 1920s, the city allocated a vast area along the northern side of 6 Sierpnia Street, between Leszno Street (now Lucjan Żeligowski Street) and Towarowa Street (now Włókniarzy Avenue), to the military. This area, known as Zelinówka (or Selinówka) in the late 19th century, originally belonged to Fryderyk Sellin. In 1925, a full-size football stadium was inaugurated at number 71, which the newly established Military Sports Club (after World War II, Military Sports Club Orzeł Łódź) took over the following year.

In 1927, tram tracks were laid along the section of the street between Piotrkowska Street and Tadeusz Kościuszko Avenue. The first trams – line 17 running from Fryderyk Sellin Square (from 1930, Józef Haller Square) towards Władysław Reymont Square and back – traveled the route on October 26. The tracks were used almost continuously for 23 years, with four lines (6, 7, 14, and 17) operating at different times. In the same year, the former Russian State Bank building became the property of Bank Polski SA.

Between 1926 and 1933, the military sports facilities at 71 6 Sierpnia Street were expanded (at that time, all had the address Fryderyk Sellin Square, from 1930, Józef Haller Square). The first stadium was replaced with one featuring an athletics track, while a second football stadium, an Olympic shooting range, four tennis courts, and various team sports fields were built closer to Towarowa Street.

During World War II, the German occupying authorities introduced German street names in 1940, renaming 6 Sierpnia Street to Bismarckstraße, in honor of Otto von Bismarck, the first Chancellor of the Reich. Later that year, after Łódź was renamed Litzmannstadt, the street was renamed again (Note: Including Herbert Norkus Straße (pre-war Romuald Traugutt and Strzelecka streets, after 1946 Romuald Traugutt Street).) to Straße der 8. Armee – to commemorate the German 8th Army, which achieved victory in the Battle of the Bzura in early autumn 1939. This name remained until the end of the war.

=== From 1945 to 1989 ===
Some residents of the Śródmieście district recount tales of the so-called Złoty Róg (Golden Horn), located at the intersection of 22 Lipca Street (now 6 Sierpnia Street) and Wólczańska Street. They do not remember where the name originated, but they recall regular brawls by hooligans over this spot. Groups of up to twenty men would face off and fight until they could no longer stand.

— Excerpt from the article Bitwa o Złoty Róg (Battle for the Golden Horn)

After the end of hostilities, the pre-war name of the street was restored. From 17 October 1945 – the day Ruda Pabianicka was officially incorporated into Łódź – until 13 November 1946, there were two streets named 6 Sierpnia in Łódź (on November 14, the street in Ruda Pabianicka was renamed Kuźnicka as part of a naming reorganization). By a resolution (No. 76) of the National Council in Łódź on 21 July 1949 approved by the State Council on 7 September 1949, the street name was changed again – 6 Sierpnia Street became 22 Lipca Street (to commemorate the date of the Manifesto of the Polish Committee of National Liberation), as announced by the City-Center District Governor of Łódź in a notice dated 2 December 1949. A few months earlier, the street had been included among those where the President of Łódź prohibited street photography (due to the prohibition of any obstruction of pedestrian traffic on sidewalks).

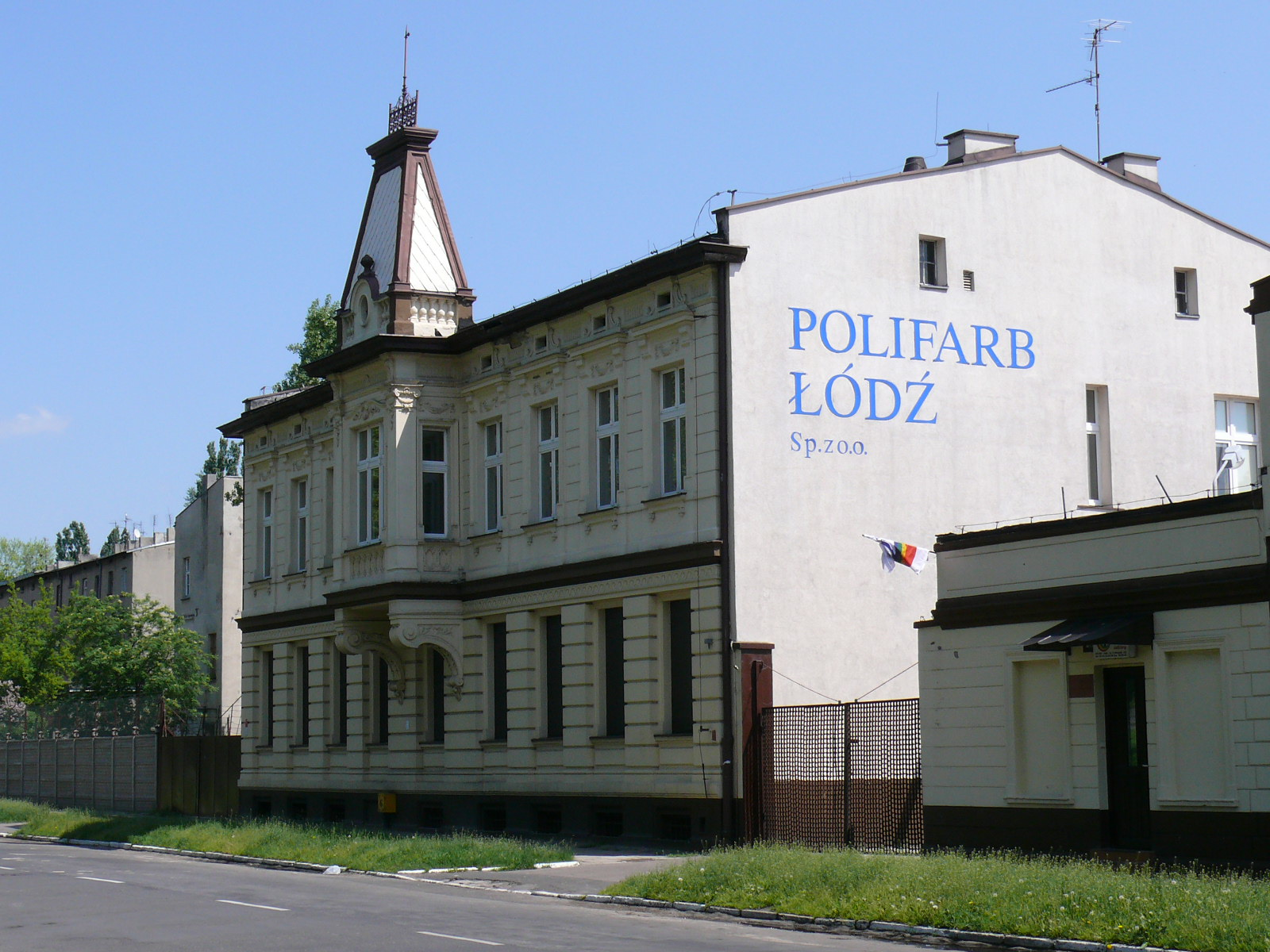
100 6 Sierpnia Street – formerly the residential house of Josel (also known as Józef) Rosenblatt from the late 19th century, currently offices of Polifarb-Łódź Sp. z o.o. (May 2007)

By the early 1950s, most industrial establishments on 6 Sierpnia / 22 Lipca Street had been nationalized. Among them were:

- the Chemical Products Factory Sterolin of F. Seidl and Alfred Gibałka (also spelled Giebler) at number 100 – taken over in 1948 (as Plant No. 6 in Łódź) by the Paint and Varnish Industry Union in Gliwice
- the Machine Factory Edelman and Ryżyk (Note: In some sources, a misspelling of the surname is encountered: Ryżek.) at number 70 – taken over in 1949 by the Central Technical Office of the Textile Machinery Industry – State Enterprise in Łódź;
- the Soap and Cosmetic Products Factory Hugo Güttel Pixin at number 15/17 – taken over in 1949 by the Łódź Fat Processing Plant – State Enterprise;
- the Mechanical Joinery and Furniture Factory Otto Konrad at number 88 – taken over in 1949 by the Warsaw-Łódź Wood Industry Plants – State Enterprise in Warsaw;
- the mechanical dyeing plant Bechtold and Seiler at number 65 – taken over in 1950 by the Maria Curie-Skłodowska Knitting Dyeing Plant – State Enterprise in Łódź.

In 1951, the state-owned Łódź Fat Processing Plant changed its name to the Ewa Cosmetics Factory, and in the early 1970s, it became the Pollena-Ewa Cosmetics Factory.

A reprivatization decision in 1945 awarded Albert Bukiet and Janina Bukiet ownership rights to the Wool and Cotton Goods Factory Bracia Bukiet located at number 58 (since 1883), which was met with strong opposition from the workforce. The factory workers staged a one-and-a-half-hour protest strike that summer, demanding the removal of both heirs – then office workers – from the factory premises and the denial of their inheritance rights. The then trade union authorities in the factory forced the heirs to leave the plant and did not recognize their ownership rights, adopting a resolution on the matter. (Note: The justification stated: The 'Bracia Bukiet' industrial plants are among the large enterprises, employing a great number of workers, and are classified as 'key' industries. After the Germans fled, the workers rebuilt and restarted the factory on their own, so it would now be unjust to return it to private hands. The resolution also mentioned that Albert and Janina Bukiet are well-off individuals and were known before the war as exploiters within the factory.) These events were reported by Dziennik Łódzki in an article titled Social Justice Has Been Served: Workers' Strike in the 'Bracia Bukiet' Factory.

At the turn of the 1940s and 1950s, the athletic track of the stadium, then belonging to the Garrison Military Sports Club Legia, was converted into a motorcycle speedway. The first competition took place on 4 June 1950 – as part of a triangular first-league speedway meet featuring teams from the Union Sports Club Ogniwo Łódź, the Union Sports Club Ogniwo Warsaw, and Unia-Olimpia Grudziądz. After 12 heats, Łódź's Ogniwo (41 points) won, followed by the Warsaw team (40 points) and the Grudziądz team (31 points), with Malinowski from Unia-Olimpia emerging as the best rider, and Tadeusz Kołeczek as the best from Łódź. In subsequent years, the track was used by riders from the Knitting Sports Club Włókniarz, KS Tramwajarz Łódź, and from 1967 until its dissolution in 1980, KS Gwardia Łódź.

From 13 August 1974, city authorities introduced one-way traffic on 22 Lipca Street from west to east – on the section from Towarowa Street (now Włókniarzy Avenue) to Tadeusz Kościuszko Avenue. In later years, two-way traffic was restored on sections between Tadeusz Kościuszko Avenue and Wólczańska Street and between Lucjan Żeligowski Street and Włókniarzy Avenue.

=== From 1989 ===
After the political transformation in Poland, the Łódź City Council restored the previous name of the street, 6 Sierpnia, on 3 December 1990 (by resolution no. V/54/90 dated 7 November 1990).

On 6 July 1992, the first city buses traveled along 6 Sierpnia Street. The route of the reactivated line 74 (from Nowe Złotno towards Norbert Barlicki Square) only ran along a 100-meter section from Stefan Żeromski Street to Mała Street, without a stop along that stretch. Shortly thereafter, on August 10 of the same year, buses also appeared on the section from Lucjan Żeligowski Street to Stefan Żeromski Street, with lines 52, 65, and 86 running on this stretch, and a stop located before Stefan Pogonowski Street. From 26 October 1927 to 15 August 2025, a total of 4 tram lines and 11 bus lines have run permanent routes along 6 Sierpnia Street (known as Bismarckstraße in 1940, Straße der 8. Armee from 1940 to 1945, and 22 Lipca Street from 1949 to 1990).

In 1992, the cosmetics factory Pollena-Ewa was transformed into a joint-stock company.

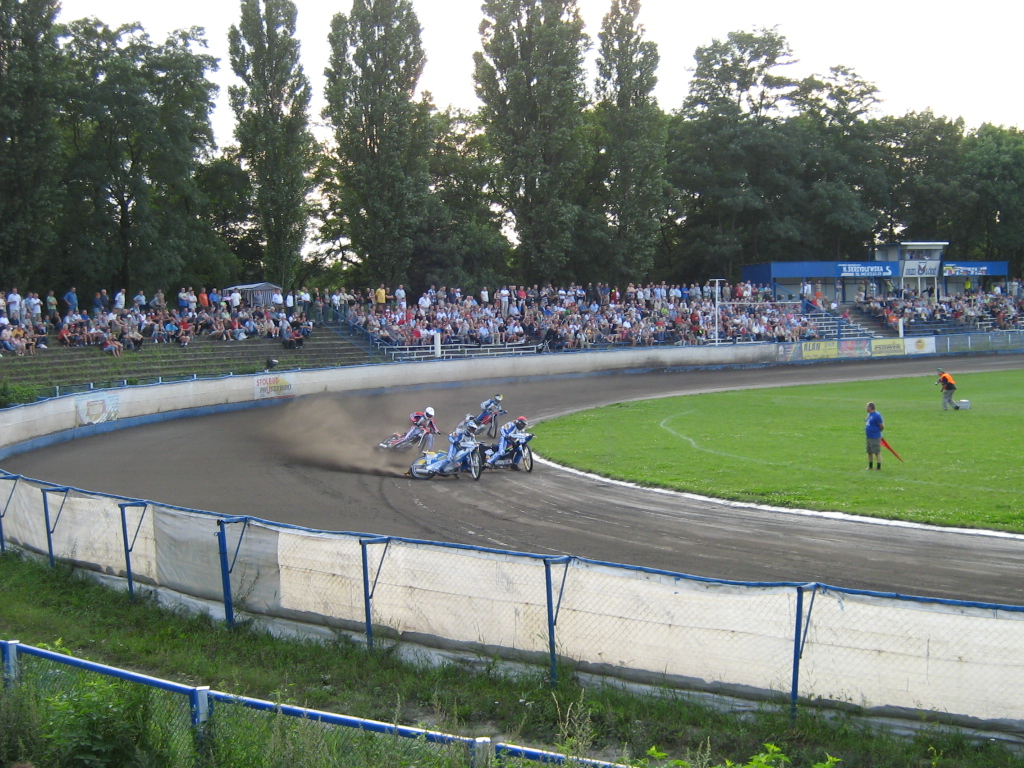
Match between Orzeł Łódź and AK Markéta Praga at the stadium at 71 6 Sierpnia Street (19 August 2007)

In 1995, speedway returned to the Orzeł-WAM stadium thanks to the establishment of the J.A.G. Speedway Club Łódź. From the 1999 season, the club ŁTŻ Łódź hosted the competitions, from the 2002 season – the TŻ Łódź club, and from the 2005 season – the Orzeł Łódź. In 2009, the city took over the sports facilities at 71 6 Sierpnia Street, managed by the Sports and Recreation Center in Łódź.

In 2003, Toruń Dressing Materials Plant became the strategic investor of the cosmetics factory Pollena-Ewa, and in November 2012, they became the sole shareholder and owner of the company. Since then, the owner gradually moved production and part of the office to Zelów, and by the end of 2014, most of the factory buildings were demolished.

On 16 September 2009, a military open-air museum was opened on the grounds adjacent to the building of the Wojskowa Komenda Uzupełnień in Łódź at number 104, initiated by Colonel Wojciech Filkowski, the then-head of the Provincial Military Staff, in cooperation with the Museum of Independence Traditions. On December 10 of the same year, the Łódź performer Cezary Bodzianowski initiated his next performance in the gate of the tenement house at number 33, using a section of a temporary water pipe as a musical instrument to blend into the old and new Łódź tradition.

At the turn of 2009 and 2010, the construction of new and renovation of existing sports facilities of Sports and Recreation Center at number 71 was completed. A full-sized grass pitch and two artificial turf pitches were handed over to the ŁKS Łódź, and 4,100 seats were installed in the speedway stadium.

In the early 2010s, the oldest part of the street became known as the designer drug capital of Poland, with several neighboring shops offering psychoactive substances on a stretch of several dozen meters.

In terms of road safety, 6 Sierpnia Street ranked 43rd among 362 Łódź streets where accidents occurred (in descending order – from streets with the most incidents) in the period from 2011 to 2013. During this time, there were 39 accidents on the street, resulting in 3 fatalities and 60 injuries, including 6 serious ones. The accident severity index (Note: The index is expressed in terms of the number of serious injuries and fatalities per 100 accidents.) reached a value of 56.4 (3rd place among 362 streets). Most incidents were recorded at the intersections with 28 Strzelców Kaniowskich Street (9), Tadeusz Kościuszko Avenue (6), and Gdańska Street (5).

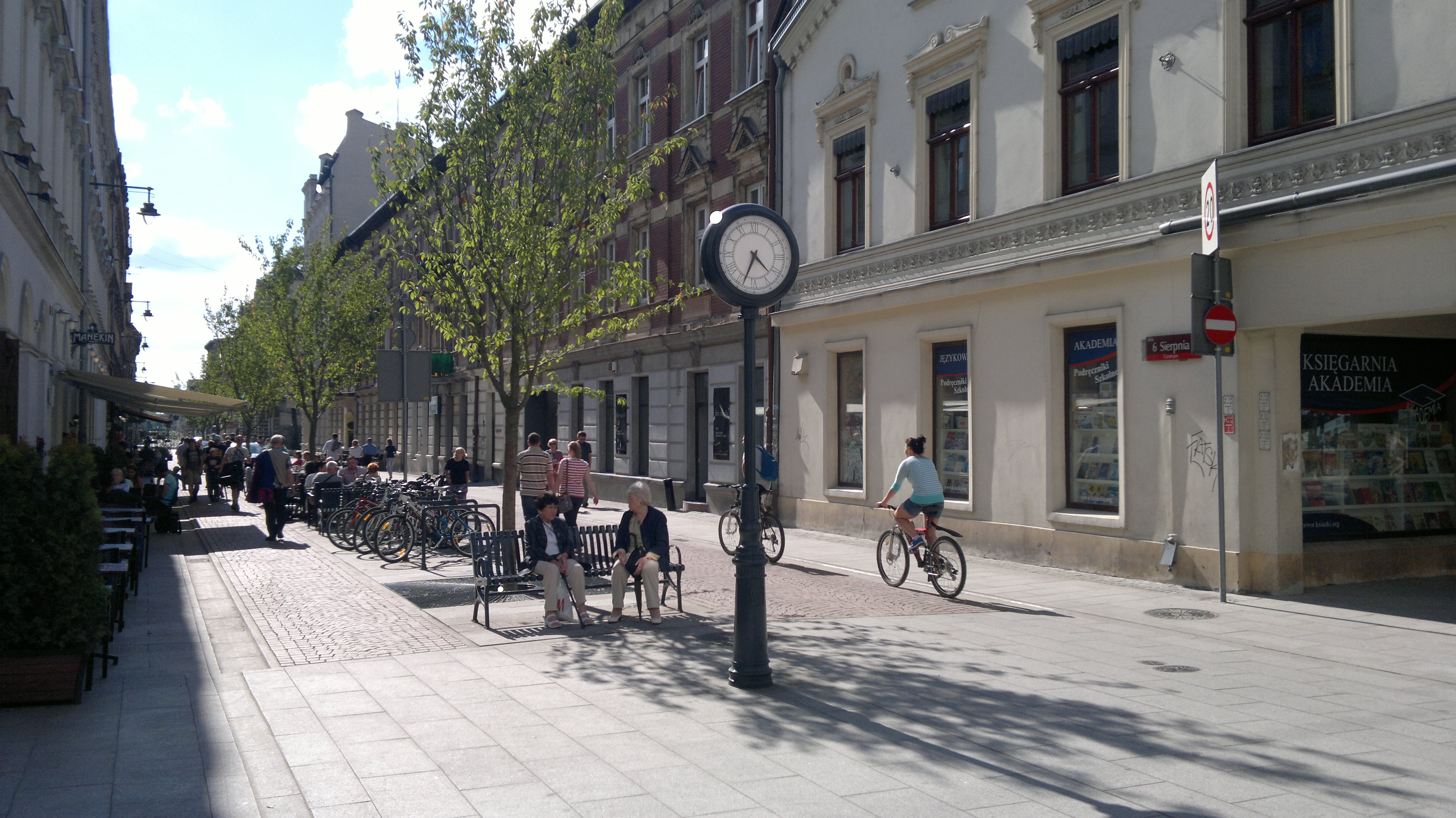
City courtyard at 6 Sierpnia Street in the third week after its opening (July 2014)

On 2 April 2014, work began on transforming the oldest section of 6 Sierpnia Street – between Piotrkowska Street and Tadeusz Kościuszko Avenue – into a woonerf, an urban courtyard inspired by urban planning solutions used in countries such as the Netherlands. The term woonerf was borrowed from Dutch by the proponents from the Normal City – Phenomenon Foundation and used for the first time in Łódź and Poland to refer to this type of urban space arrangement. The renovation included replacing the asphalt surface with pavers and granite slabs, installing flowerbeds, benches, bicycle racks, an ornamental street clock, and planting five Kanzan cherry trees imported from Germany along the street. Additionally, parking spaces were designated, and this section was made a traffic-calmed zone. The work lasted two and a half months, and the courtyard was officially opened on June 28. The transformation, proposed by Bartłomiej Derdzikowski, (Note: The first discussion of the idea took place in the fall of 2013 at the Łódź Art Cellar Przechowalnia at 5 6 Sierpnia Street.) was carried out despite opposition from the City Architect of Łódź, Marek Janiak, the Łódź District Chamber of Architects of the Republic of Poland, and the Łódź branch of the Polish Urbanists Association, as part of the first edition of the Łódź civic budget, at a cost of 1.4 million PLN. The same Polish Urbanists Association branch awarded a special prize on 11 May 2015 for the revaluation of Piotrkowska and 6 Sierpnia streets in Łódź in the 11th edition of its competition for the best-developed public space in the Łódź Voivodeship. Earlier, on 21 April 2015, the courtyard received an award for the best civic budget project in Poland, granted by the Municipal Portal I Live Here! – Smart Ideas for a Smart City at the VII European Economic Congress in Katowice.

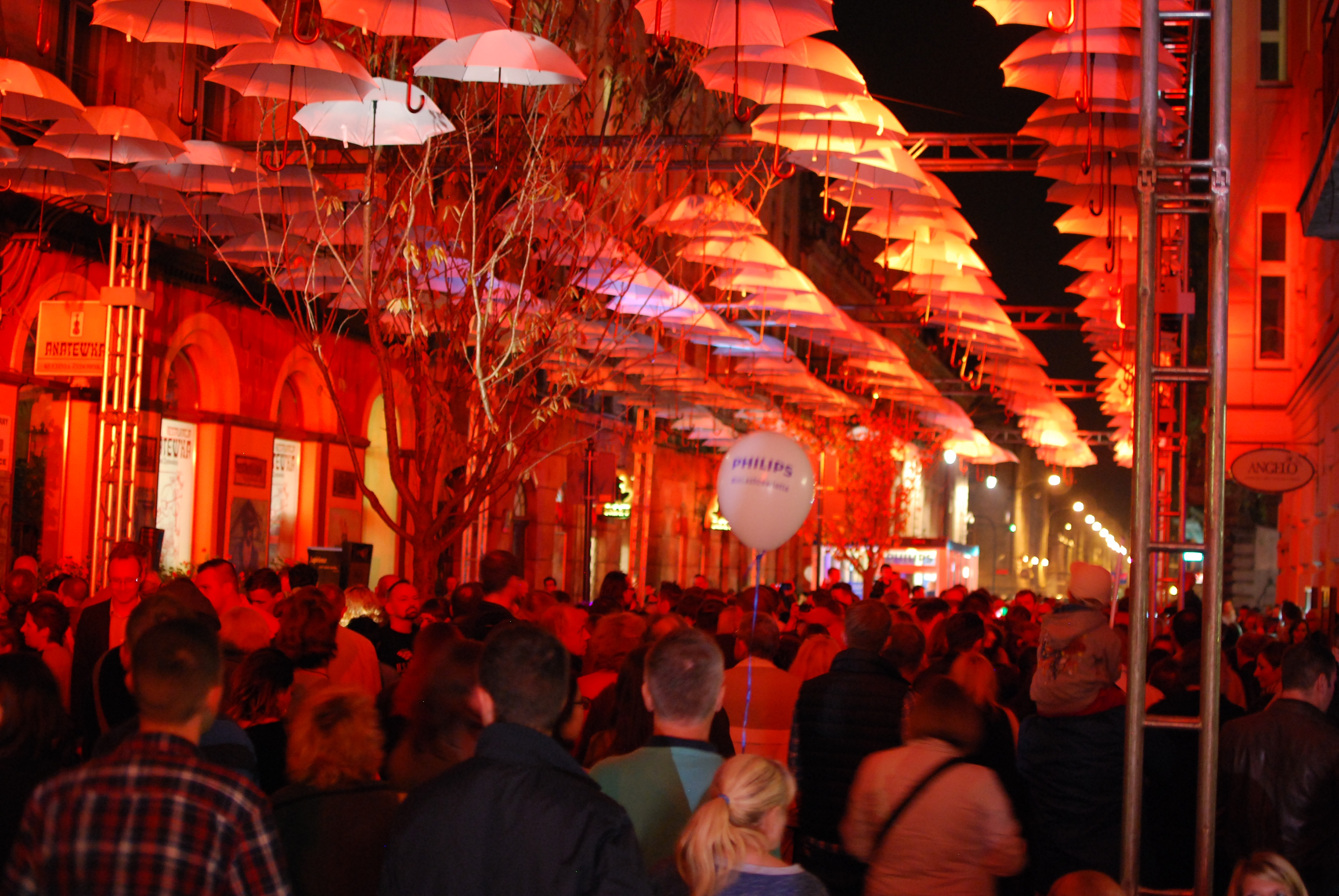
6 Sierpnia Street – light arrangement Philips Brothers Street during the 4th edition of the Light Move Festival (11 October 2014)

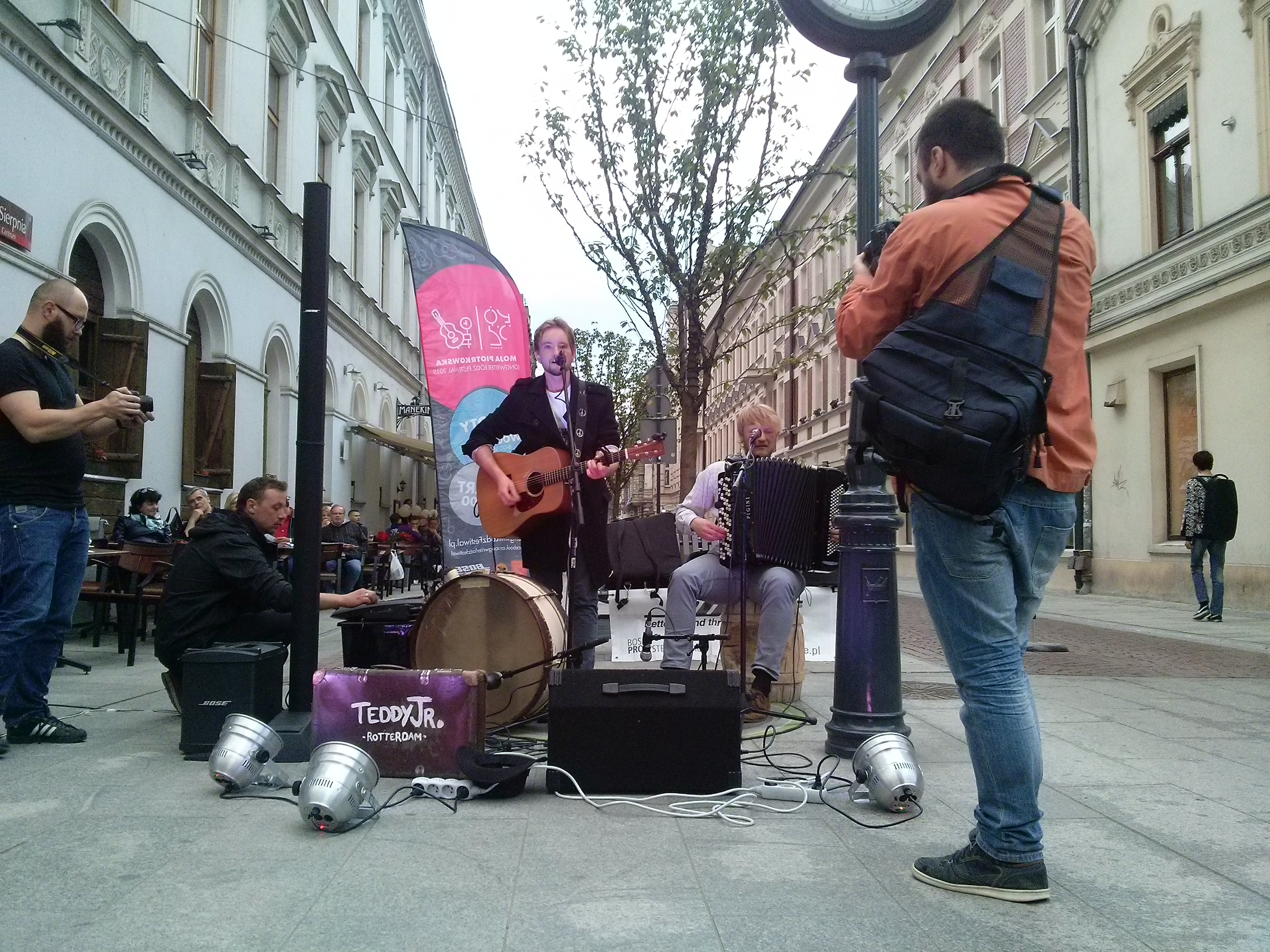
Concert by Teddy Jr. from Rotterdam as part of the Songwriter Łódź Festival (30 May 2015)

Shortly after the courtyard's opening, local entrepreneurs and restaurateurs (including the Piwoteka Narodowa pub and the Ato Sushi and Manekin restaurants) organized the first birthday celebration of 6 Sierpnia Street on 6 August 2014. The event included an arm wrestling tournament, a karate demonstration, Japanese calligraphy workshops, and performances by clowns and stilt walkers. The street's birthday was celebrated again the following year.

In autumn 2014, the Light Move Festival visited the courtyard on 6 Sierpnia Street for the first time (4th edition from October 10 to 12). A light arrangement named Philips Brothers Street was presented, and a light painting competition was organized by the Łódź Lux Pro Monumentis Foundation. The event returned in 2015 (5th edition, from October 9 to 11) and 2017 (7th edition, from September 29 to October 1).

Since spring 2015, street music performances have been held at the intersection with Piotrkowska Street every spring, summer, and autumn as part of the Songwriter Łódź Festival. The first street concert was given by Peter J. Birch on 11 April 2015. In 2015, 37 concerts were held, attended by 7,000 spectators. On May 14 of that year, a dance flash mob took place in this spot, where Maciej Maślakiewicz, a member of the Czarne Stopy dance group, promoted his efforts to participate in workshops and performances on New York's Broadway. The urban courtyard on 6 Sierpnia Street has become a cult place in Łódź, popular among residents and hosting many events.

In mid-2016, the renovation of the building at number 37, built in 1915 and listed in the municipal registry of Łódź monuments, began. On May 16 of that year, preparatory work began for the construction of a new speedway stadium for Orzeł Łódź at number 71 (on the site of a smaller football field), and the cornerstone was laid on October 2. The inauguration ceremony of the finished facility, designed for 10,400 spectators, took place on 29 July 2018. The inaugural match between Orzeł Łódź and the Gdańsk Speedway Club Wybrzeże, as part of the 1st league of the Polish Team Speedway Championships, was interrupted and canceled after two heats due to heavy rain.

According to TripAdvisor users' ratings, in March 2018, among the top 10 best restaurants in Łódź, four were located on 6 Sierpnia Street: in 1st place – Ato Sushi (at number 1, Asian cuisine), in 3rd place – Anatewka (at number 2/4, Polish, European, Eastern European, Central European, and Israeli cuisines), in 6th place – Manekin (1 6 Sierpnia Street / 65 Piotrkowska Street, Polish, European, Central European cuisines), and in 9th place – Angelo Ristorante (at number 1/3, Italian, Mediterranean, and European cuisines).

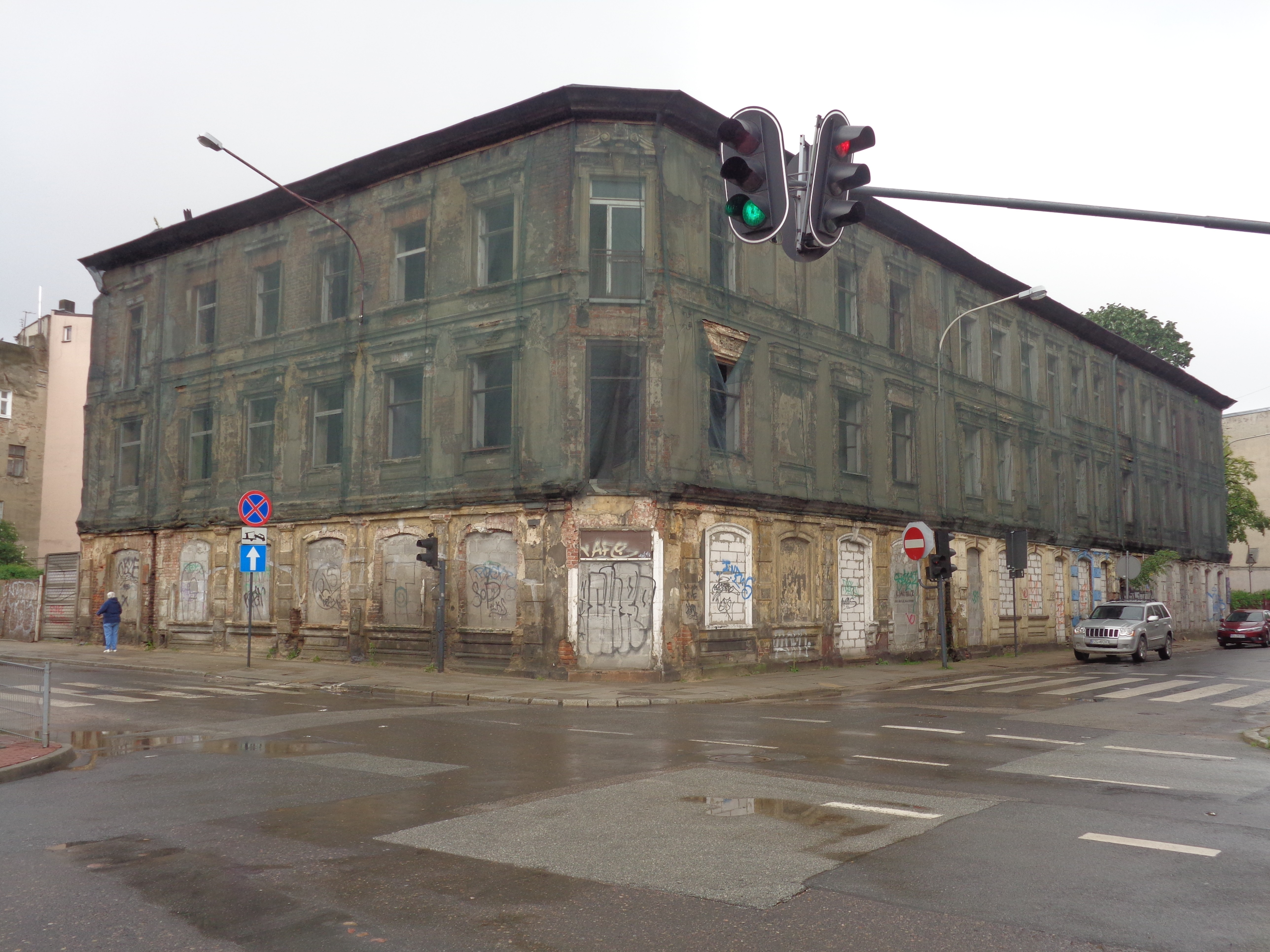
Tenement house at number 10. 11 weeks before the collapse (17 May 2018)

Around mid-April 2018, a building collapse occurred at number 21, at the intersection with Gdańska Street. On the evening of April 13, in an abandoned two-story tenement house that had been in very poor technical condition for many years, the ceiling of the first floor and part of the cornice collapsed. On April 16, about a quarter of the building fell. Until the complete demolition of the ruins, which took place from April 25 to 28, it was necessary to close the street to both vehicular and pedestrian traffic between Gdańska and Mała streets. A second similar incident occurred on 2 August 2018 in the early morning hours. A 10 m^{2} ceiling collapsed in a tenement house at number 10, at the corner of Wólczańska Street, which was slated for demolition. This necessitated the closure of 6 Sierpnia Street between Tadeusz Kościuszko Avenue and Gdańska Street, as well as Wólczańska Street between Zielona and 6 Sierpnia streets, for over a month. By mid-September, the tenement house was demolished to the height of the first floor. In October, the provincial conservator of monuments granted permission for the complete demolition of the remaining front building. Contrary to earlier press reports suggesting the possibility of removal as early as early 2019, demolition work was only carried out in the second half of September.

From 22 August 2020, due to the planned construction of the Łódź Cross-City Line between Łódź Fabryczna railway station and the Łódź Kaliska and Łódź Żabieniec railway stations, as well as the Łódź Śródmieście stop, traffic was partially reorganized on the street. Two-way traffic was introduced on the section from Wólczańska Street to Stefan Żeromski Street.

In September 2021, a private student dormitory Chill In was opened at number 70B, built by Revisit Home, featuring 153 single or double rooms, a relaxation zone, laundry, parking, and a rooftop garden.

On 23 September 2023, the Sports Center of the Medical University of Łódź was opened at number 69. The nearly century-old building was revitalized at a cost of 12.6 million PLN and now houses a sports hall with spectator seating, a 25-meter swimming pool, and a gym.

At the end of 2023, the investor – Balt Invest – began selling apartments in the multi-family building La Vie Art (designed by Marcin Tomaszewski), which is planned to be erected by 2026 on the plot at number 10 at the corner of Wólczańska Street (vacant after the demolition of the tenement ruins in 2019).

=== Headquarters of former companies and institutions ===
Before World War II, several companies and institutions were headquartered at 6 Sierpnia Street, including:

- No. 1: Art Salon of Zygmunt Bartkiewicz (1895–1899);
- No. 2: Juliusz Pruszynowski's wool goods factory, established in 1905; Wool Goods Manufacturing Goldman, Kapłan and Hirszfeld; Buszko Borysiewicz and Co. founded in 1925; warehouse of the Semi-Woolen and Cotton Goods Factory Rotberg and Adler;
- No. 4: Association of Masters of the Textile Industry of the Łódź Voivodeship;
- No. 5: Wool Goods Factory Karol Kretschmer, founded in 1857, operated at this address until the late 1880s and early 1890s;
- No. 6: Military City Command; Second Tax Office (Central);
- No. 7: Łódź Customs Agency of the State Railways;
- No. 15: Wool spinning mill of Henryk Feder and Jakub Vive, 1880 – early 1920s; Toilet Soap and Cosmetics Factory – Hugo Güttel and Józef Wójtowicz (1923–1926), Toilet Soap and Cologne Water Factory Józef Wójtowicz, Hugo Güttel and Co. (1926–1929), Soap and Cosmetics Factory Hugo Güttel Pixin (since 1929);
- No. 15/17: Sante Surgical-Gynecological Clinic;
- No. 17: Cotton spinning mill of Stefan Angerstein, launched in 1909 (in 1932, the divided factory was taken over by Abram Berliński and Hugo Güttel);
- No. 22: Mason's Guild of Łódź; Aid Circle for Polish Legionnaires and Their Families, as well as an inn for Polish soldiers;
- No. 25: Weaving mill of Hersz Rotberg, Chil Rotberg, and Izaak Szarf, established in 1920;
- No. 26: Carriage workshop of Paweł Kalkbrenner, founded in 1896;
- No. 37: Łódź Jewish Mutual Aid Society Gmilas Hasodim;
- No. 41: Guild of Surgeons of Łódź;
- No. 56: Polish co-educational Municipal Elementary School No. 33, directed by Adam Okraszewski; later, Public Elementary School No. 33;
- No. 58: Wool and Cotton Goods Factory Bracia Bukiet, founded in 1883;
- No. 59: Association of Midwives of the Republic of Poland, Łódź Branch;
- No. 65: Yarn dyeing and knitwear manufacturing Bechtold and Seiler (in 1926, the owners were Albert and Herman Bechtold);
- No. 70: Machinery Factory Edelman and Ryżyk; (Note: In some sources, a misspelling of the surname is encountered: Ryżek.)
- No. 71: Sports facilities of the Military Sports Club, established in 1926;
- No. 72: Textile factory (shredder branch) and warehouse of textile products of Eljasz Gutsztadt, steam wool spinning mill of Edward Scholz vel Scholtz (Note: The Łodzianin. Kalendarz Informacyjno-Adresowy na rok 1897 lists Edward Szolc as the owner of the property, while Henryk Scholz is noted as the owner of the spinning mill.) (from 1881, destroyed by fire in 1889, then rebuilt);
- No. 74: Cotton Goods Weaving Mill of the Kon brothers (interwar period, operating since at least 1898);
- No. 80: Paint factory of Josel vel Józef Rosenblatt, founded in 1889 on the initiative of Jan Śniechowski, a pioneer of the dye industry in Polish lands, operating until 1894;
- No. 86: Imperial Russian Army military barracks, occupied in the autumn of 1914 by, among others, the II Battalion of the 1st Regiment of Polish Legions Infantry, during World War I by the Imperial German Army, in 1918 by soldiers of the 28th Infantry Regiment Łódź Children (later 28th Kaniowskie Rifle Regiment), from 1921 by soldiers of the 4th Heavy Artillery Regiment of the Polish Army;
- No. 88: Paweł Holc and Co. – Engineering and Construction Works Company, Łódź branch; Mechanical Carpentry and Furniture Factory Otto Konrad;
- No. 94: Workers' Sports Club Huragan;
- No. 100: Wool dyeing plant belonging to the Vein family (existed until 1936); Chemical Products Factory Sterolin of F. Seidl and Alfred Gibałka vel Giebler, founded in 1932, moved to 6 Sierpnia Street in 1936;
- No. 102: Sztajnberg, Śpiewak and Co. – Dyeing Plant, founded in 1919;
- No. 104: Municipal Concrete Plant. Shortly before the outbreak of World War I, this property was purchased by the Electric Lighting Joint-Stock Company, intending to build the second Łódź power plant there, with its own industrial spur from the Łódź Kaliska Towarowa railway station; the company managed to start the construction of the gatehouse and office building, but further work was halted by the outbreak of the war and was never resumed.

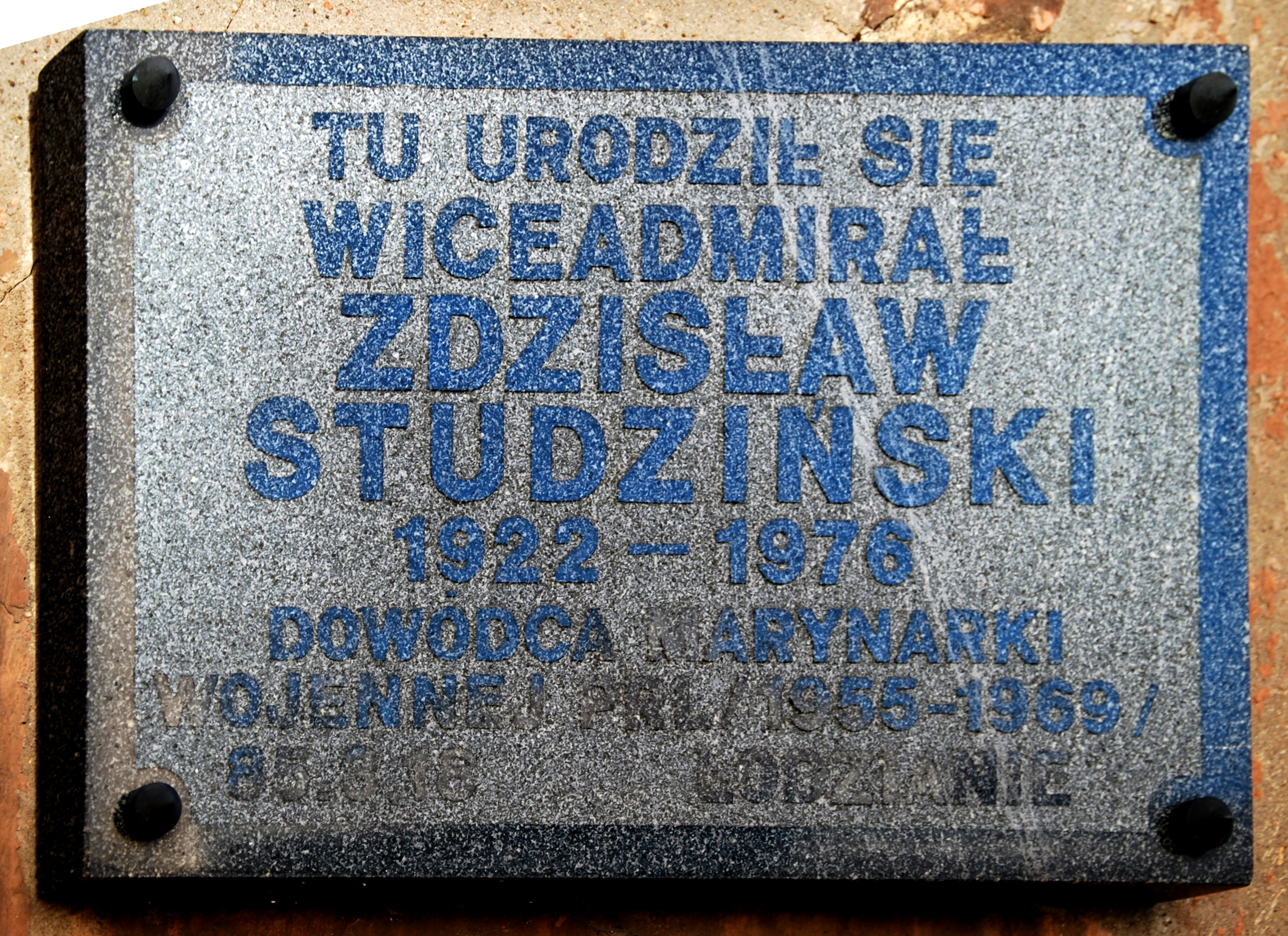
Plaque commemorating the birthplace of Zdzisław Studziński at number 26 (October 2011)

=== Notable citizens ===
- Karol Kretschmer (industrialist) along with his family – 1/3B enedykta Street (from the 1850s to the 1890s), B5 enedykta Street 5from the 1890s);
- Josel vel Józef Rosenblatt, industrialist, owner of the dye factory at number 80 – 100 Benedykta Street, 19th/20th century;
- Stefan Angerstein, industrialist – 15/17 Benedykta Street (later Benediktstraße, 6 Sierpnia), from the second decade of the 20th century until World War II;
- Salomon Budzyner, industrialist, senator of the 2nd term of the Senate of the Republic of Poland from 1928 to 1930 – 2/4 6 Sierpnia Street, interwar period;
- Antoni Burger, deputy director of the Łódź branch of the Bank Polski SA – 6 6 Sierpnia Street, interwar period;
- Stefan Derkowski, architect – 22 6 Sierpnia Street, interwar period;
- Michał Didyk, musician, described by a journalist from the trade magazine Na Parkiecie as a very high-class trumpeter, member of the Witkowski Polish Orchestra – 10 6 Sierpnia Street, interwar period;
- Boruch Grynoch, industrialist, inventor of the patented spittoon in 1931 – 16 6 Sierpnia Street, interwar period;
- Zdzisław Studziński, vice admiral, commander of the Polish Navy of the Polish People's Republic from 1955 to 1969 – 26 6 Sierpnia Street (place of birth in 1922);
- Bolesław Witkowski, painter – 33 6 Sierpnia Street, interwar period;
- Lechosław Uciński, the original model for the character Leszek Górecki from the TV series Daleko od szosy (1976) directed by Zbigniew Chmielewski (co-author of the screenplay – Henryk Czarnecki – published a novel of manners under the same title in 1979) – as a bachelor rented a room in one of the tenements on 22 Lipca Street, 1960s/1970s.

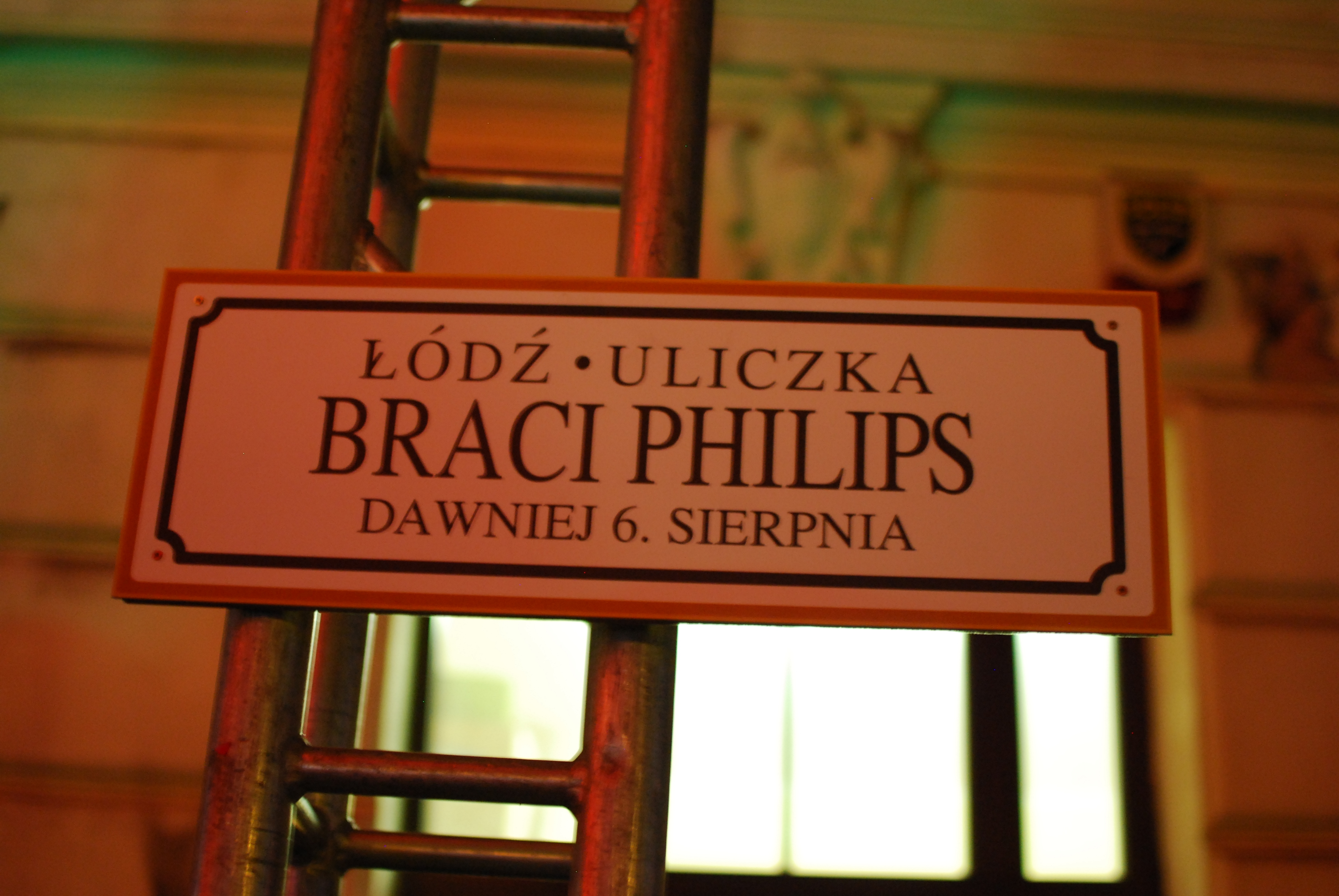
Plaque with the unofficial name of the street section placed during the 4th edition of the Light Move Festival (11 October 2014)

=== Street name changes ===
duration	name
1825–1863	Krótka Street / Круткая улица (Note: In the first half of the 19th century, only the section from Piotrkowska Street to Wólczańska Street existed. The name used was not an official name.)
1863–1915	Benedykta Street / св. Бенедикта улица (Note: In some sources, the name St. Benedykta Street is used in reference to the period before World War I. However, the first part of the name was officially added only in 1918, after Poland regained independence.) (Note: On a map by Władysław Starzyński drawn up between 1894 and 1896, it is visible as Benedykta Street (св. Бенедикта улица).)
1915–1918	Benediktstraße
1918–1919	Benedykta Street
1919–1940	6 Sierpnia Street
1940	Bismarckstraße
1940–1945	Straße der 8. Armee (Note: Including Herbert Norkus Straße (pre-war Romuald Traugutt and Strzelecka streets, after 1946 Romuald Traugutt Street).)
1945–1949	6 Sierpnia Street
1949–1990	22 Lipca Street
from 1990	6 Sierpnia Street

== 6 Sierpnia Street in film ==
- At 6 Sierpnia Street (then 22 Lipca Street), a scene was shot involving an MO police car of the Warszawa brand, traveling from Dr. Greger's hypnosis session to the Malczyks' apartment in the 7th episode titled Śpiący nie kłamie of the TV series Kapitan Sowa na tropie (1965) directed by Stanisław Bareja. In the film, the car drives along 22 Lipca Street from Piotrkowska Street and turns left onto Tadeusz Kościuszko Avenue, crossing an intersection that in the 1960s was not yet closed to straight-ahead and left-turn traffic.
- In June 2010, a segment of a car chase was filmed on the section between Piotrkowska Street and Tadeusz Kościuszko Avenue for the crime comedy Weekend (2010), the directorial debut of Cezary Pazura. In this scene, Police Commissioner (Jan Frycz) chases Maja (Małgorzata Socha), Max (Paweł Małaszyński), and "Gula" (Michał Lewandowski) – the cars turn from Tadeusz Kościuszko Avenue onto 6 Sierpnia Street, with the intersection of the two streets (already closed to straight-ahead and left-turn traffic) visible in the background, followed by the even side of the street, including the Anatewka restaurant.
- In the building of the Physical Education and Sports Study of the Medical University at number 71, some scenes of the feature film Jaskółka (2013) were shot – the second full-length diploma film directed by Bartosz Warwas (following Jerzy Skolimowski's Identification Marks: None).

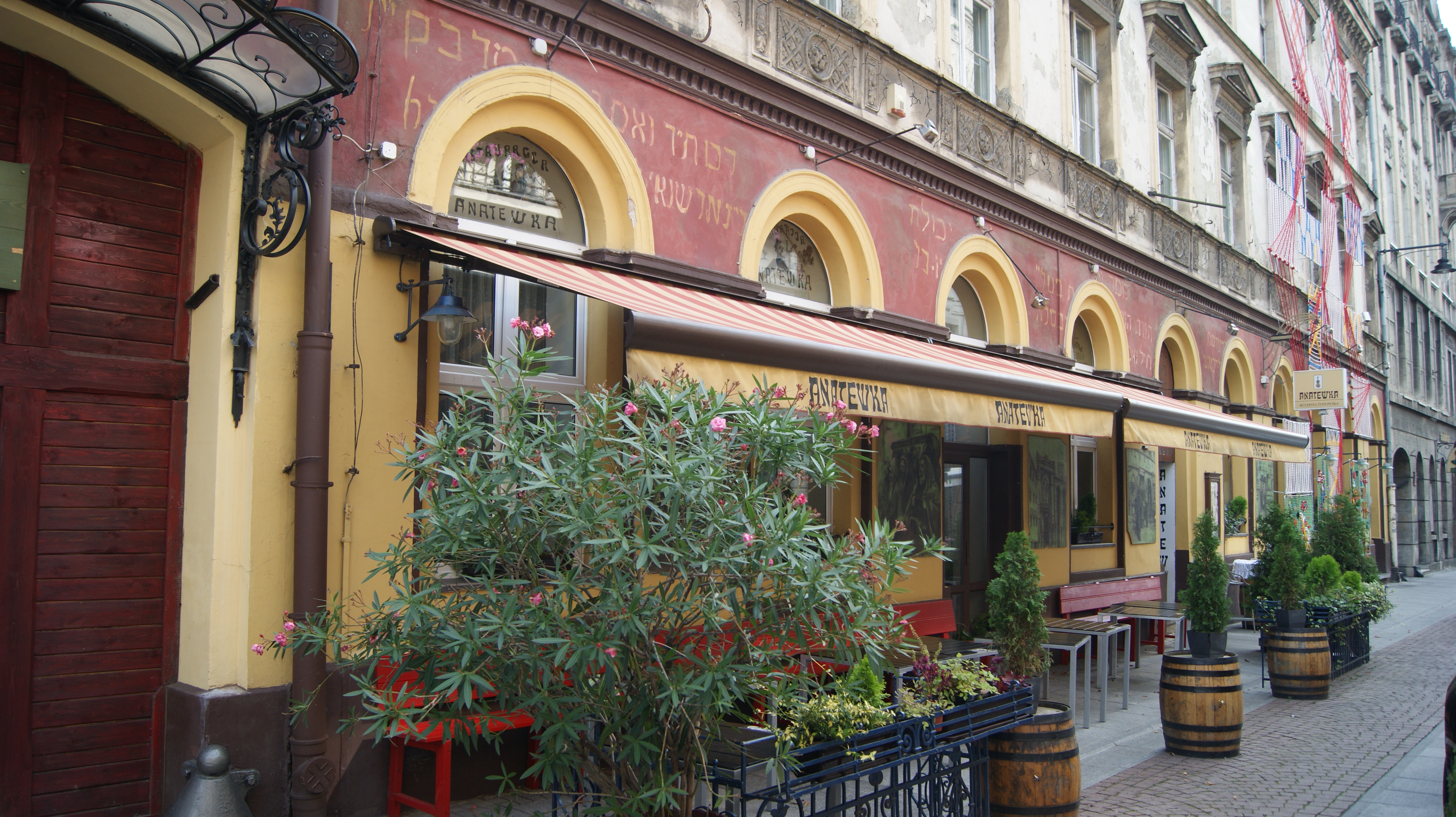
Restaurant Anatewka at No. 2/4 (October 2016)

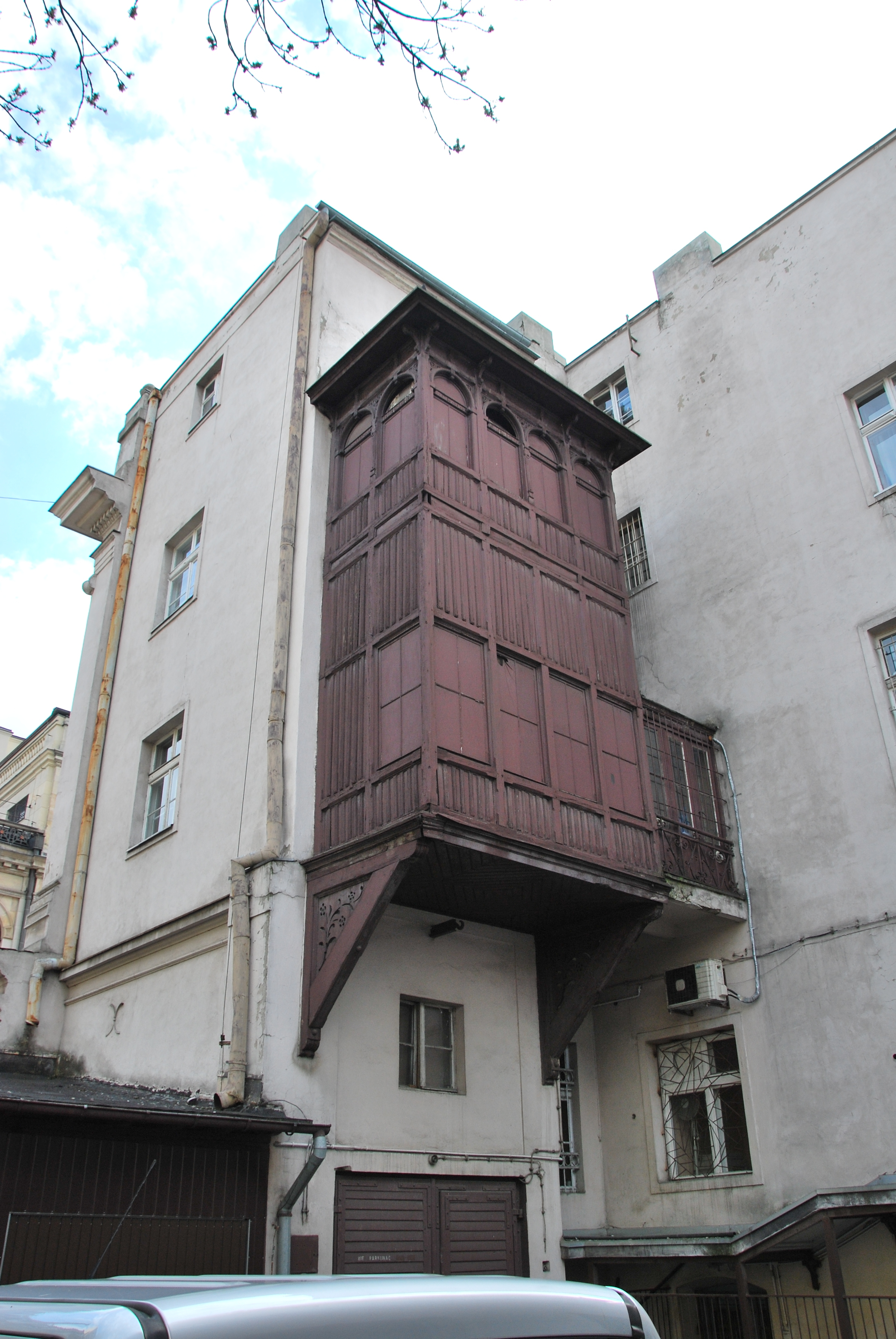
Two-story Jewish sukkah at No. 5 (April 2012)

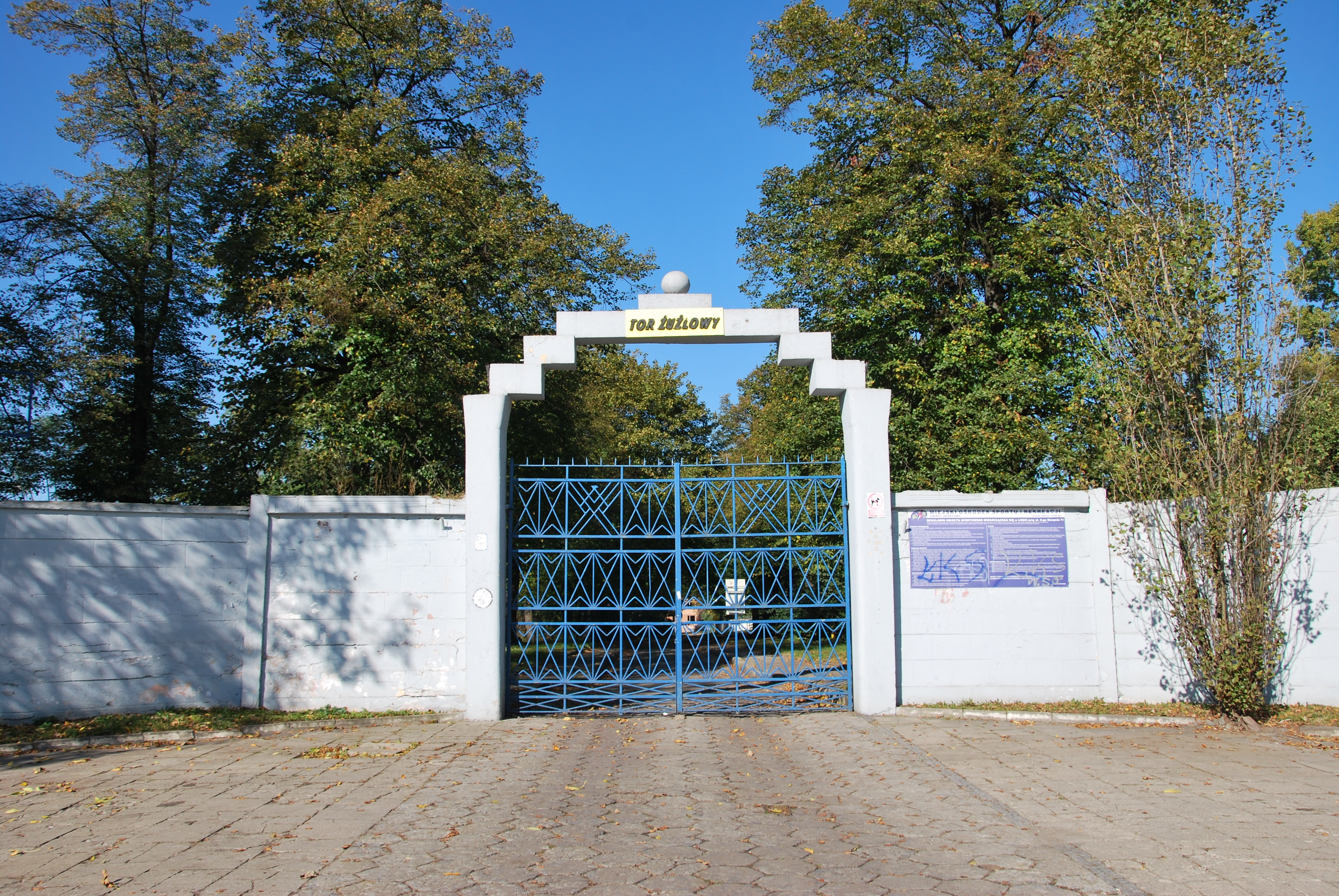
Gate leading to the old Orzeł Łódź speedway stadium (October 2011)

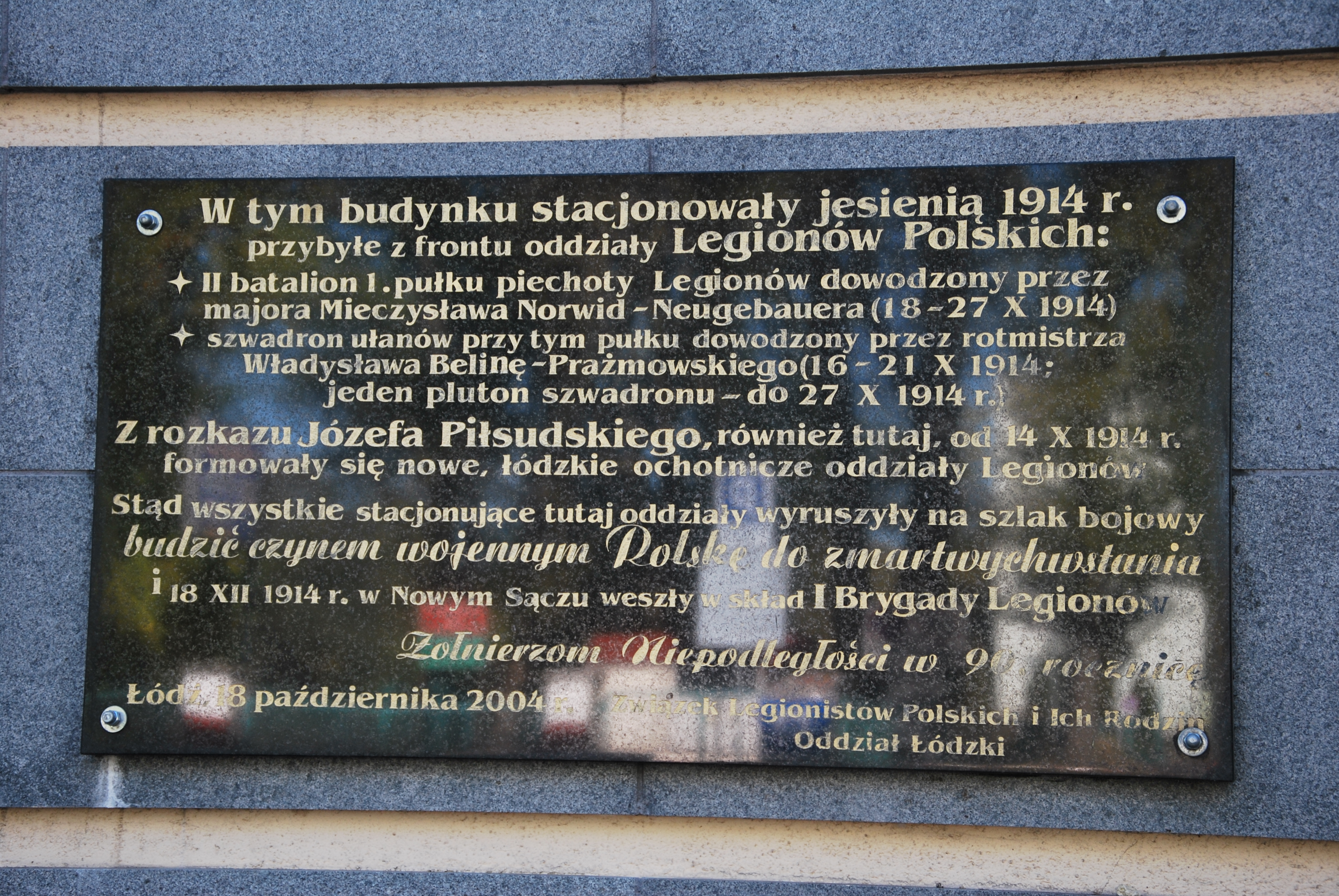
Plaque commemorating the stationing of the Polish Legions at No. 86 (October 2011)

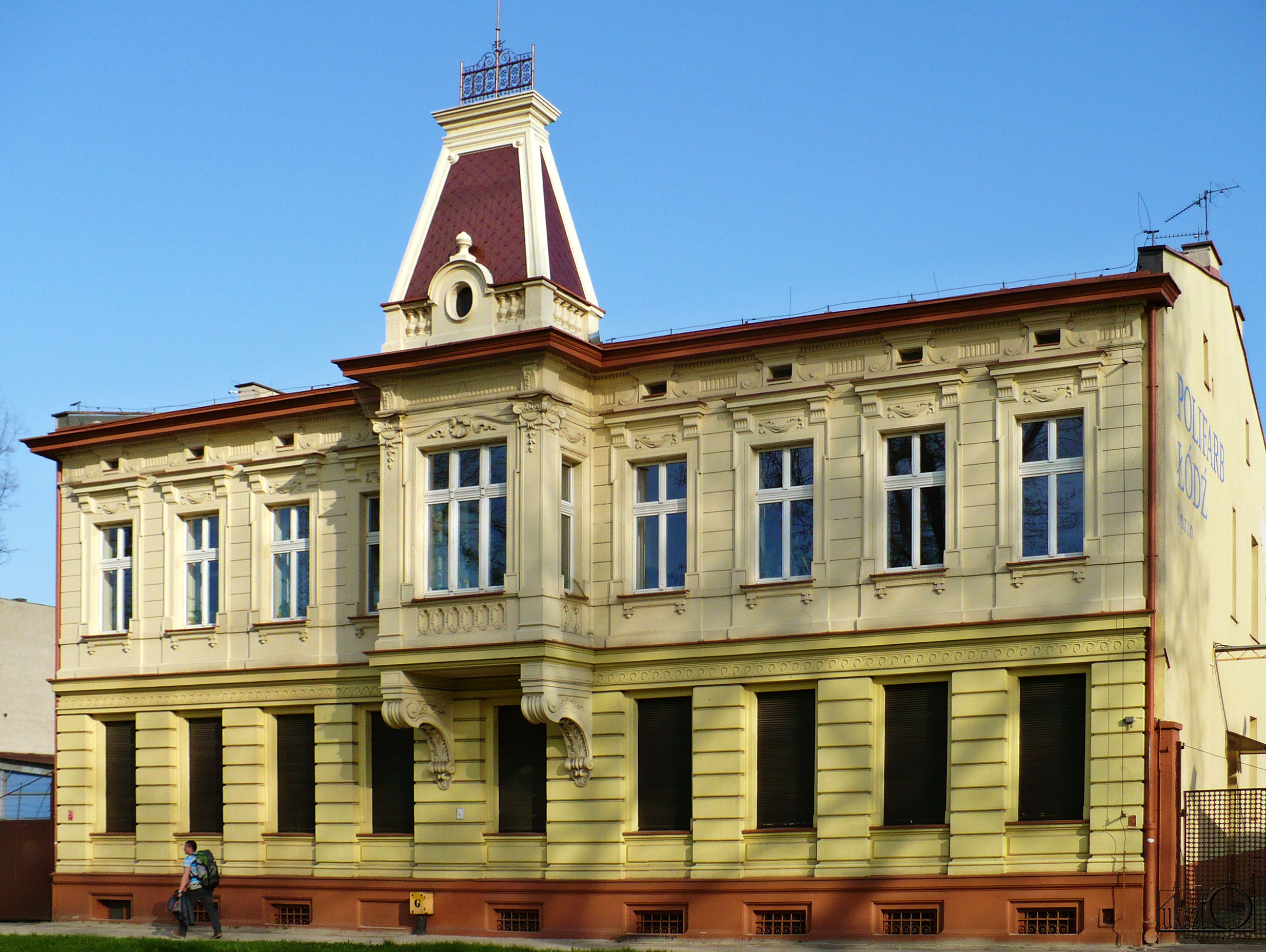
No. 100 6 Sierpnia Street – former residential house of Josel vel Józef Rosenblatt from the late 19th century, now offices of Polifarb-Łódź (May 2013)

== Buildings and establishments ==
- No. 1/3 – Kretschmer family tenement from 1870, thoroughly renovated in 2015;
- No. 2/4 – restaurant Anatewka, specializing in Jewish cuisine, founded in 2001 by Paweł Zyner, son of Mieczysław Zyner, long-time director of the nearby Grand Hotel, who became a co-owner of Zyner & Zyner in 2006. The place has been visited by numerous prominent figures from politics, business, media, culture, and sports. (Note: The guest book included (until April 2017) former presidents of Poland: Lech Kaczyński, Bronisław Komorowski and Aleksander Kwaśniewski; former Prime Ministers of Poland: Marek Belka, Jan Krzysztof Bielecki, Jerzy Buzek and Leszek Miller; politicians: Ryszard Kalisz, Jan Nowak-Jeziorański, Janusz Palikot and Jerzy Urban; actors and actresses: Anna Dymna, Janusz Gajos, Bogusław Linda, Daniel Olbrychski, Cezary Pazura, Max Ryan; musicians: Joe Cocker, Krzysztof Penderecki, Jean-Luc Ponty and Tomasz Stańko; writers: Marc Levy and Umberto Eco; directors: Jerzy Antczak, Jerzy Gruza, Agnieszka Holland, Claude Lanzmann, Jan Machulski and Krzysztof Zanussi; athletes: Tomasz Adamek, Zbigniew Boniek, Andrzej Gołota, Krzysztof Hołowczyc, Otylia Jędrzejczak, Grzegorz Lato, Andrzej Supron and Jacek Wszoła.) Previously, during the Polish People's Republic period, it housed the Smakosz restaurant, described by Jerzy Krzywik Kaźmierczyk in his collection of memoirs about old Łódź locales;
- No. 5 – eclectic tenement-residence of industrialist Karol Kretschmer, built between 1888 and 1896 on the site of his former wool scarf factory, relocated to Szosa Milscha (now 62 Mikołaj Kopernik Street). Designed by Franciszek Chełmiński, featuring a two-story Jewish sukkah visible from the courtyard. Post-World War II, it housed the Starostwo Grodzkie Śródmiejsko-Łódzkie headquarters. Renovation has been planned since 2012. The basement hosts the music club Przechowalnia, founded and run by Elżbieta Adamiak and Andrzej Poniedzielski since 1995. The upper floors and attic are occupied by the Municipal Geodesy Company. In mid-2016, the process of registering the building as a historic monument began;
- No. 6 (and 14 Tadeusz Kościuszko Avenue) – corner building of the former Russian State Bank, since 1927 housing Bank Polski SA, and from 1945, the regional branch of National Bank of Poland. From the 1990s to 2013, also housed the IV Branch of Kredyt Bank SA;
- No. 7 (and 13 Tadeusz Kościuszko Avenue) – corner tenement, previously housing the Masza café during the Polish People's Republic period;
- No. 8 – annex of the now non-existent palace of Juliusz Kunitzer from 1888, (Note: The palace itself, occupying the property at 15 Spacerowa Street, also known as Promenada (now Tadeusz Kościuszko Avenue), was demolished in 1910 after a fire. It was replaced by the building of the Bank Handlowy, constructed between 1911 and 1913 (since 1987, the headquarters of the Łódź branch of PKO Bank Polski).) since 1987 serving as the support building for the first branch of PKO Bank Polski in Łódź;
- No. 15/17 – villa of Henryk Feder from the late 19th century, neighboring a 1.6 ha area where the Pollena-Ewa cosmetics factory was demolished in the early 21st century;
- No. 26 – tenement where Vice Admiral Zdzisław Studziński, commander of the Polish Navy from 1955 to 1969, was born on 14 August 1922 (died 7 March 1976 in Gdynia); a plaque dedicated to him is on the front wall. The XII Student House of the University of Łódź was located in the annex;
- No. 49 – former residential house;
- No. 58/60 – textile factory Magam, producing woven labels, ribbons, curtain and drapery tapes (the largest producer in Poland);
- No. 61 – former residential house of Kazimierz and Marianna Rosiak;
- No. 69 – Sports Center of the Medical University of Łódź;
- No. 70B – private student dormitory Chill In, with 153 single or double rooms and a rooftop garden, opened in September 2021;
- No. 71 – headquarters of the Orzeł Łódź Sports Club and the Orzeł Łódź Speedway Club, on land belonging to Fryderyk Sellin in the late 19th century, the so-called Zelinówka (or Selinówka). The first stadium was built there in 1925 and adapted for speedway competitions after World War II. The new speedway stadium with 10,400 seats was opened on 29 July 2018. It is also home to the Physical Education and Sports Studies of the Medical University;
- No. 72 – remains of Edward Scholz's wool spinning mill from 1881, rebuilt in the late 1890s after a fire;
- No. 74 – headquarters of Trade-Stomil;
- No. 80 – Fresco hostel;
- No. 86 – former barracks of the pre-war 4th Heavy Artillery Regiment, from 1959 to 1967 housed the 8th Łódź School Motor Regiment of the Internal Security Corps, and after its dissolution, from 1966 the 8th Łódź Internal Defense Regiment, modernized in 2007, now the office of the Łódź-Polesie Tax Office. A plaque commemorating the stationing of the Polish Legions in autumn 1914 was placed on the front wall on 18 October 2004, marking the 90th anniversary of the event;
- No. 92 – headquarters of the Military Medical Training Center named after Brigadier General Dr. Stefan Hubicki, established on 1 January 2011 by transforming the Military Medical Services Training Center and the Medical Services NCO School;
- No. 94 and 96 – known as the Workers' Citadel, two isolated twin tenements located at the end of the street;
- No. 100 – former residential house of Josel vel Józef Rosenblatt from the late 19th century, now offices of Polifarb-Łódź;
- No. 100/102 – Polifarb-Łódź – since 17 January 1992, previously: United Paint and Varnish Plants in Gliwice, Plant No. 6 based in Łódź (from 2 January 1946 to 1951), Łódź Paint and Varnish Plant (1951–1976), Polifarb Paint and Varnish Plants in Łódź (1976–1992);
- No. 104 – former headquarters of the Provincial Military Staff in Łódź (until 31 December 2012) and the Military Recruitment Office in Łódź (until 19 March 2017), with an adjacent military open-air museum opened on 16 September 2009 as a joint project of the Museum of Independence Traditions in Łódź and the Provincial Military Staff in Łódź, featuring, among others, 57 mm anti-tank guns model 43, a T-34 tank (brought from Kutno, where it served as a monument for many years), a Mi-2 helicopter (brought from the 23rd Air Base in Mińsk Mazowiecki), and a PZL TS-11 Iskra training aircraft (brought from the Polish Air Force University in Dęblin).

As of August 2016, 17 buildings on 6 Sierpnia Street were listed in the municipal heritage register of Łódź: 9 tenements (Nos. 1/3, 4, 14, 28–32, 29, 37, and 70a), two front buildings (No. 7 and 13 Tadeusz Kościuszko Avenue), Karol Kretschmer's residence (No. 5), the annex of Juliusz Kunitzer's palace (No. 8), and four residential houses (Nos. 15/17, 49, 61, and 100).

== Marking ==
Since 2006, the street has been marked within the Łódź Integrated Municipal System with signs in two variants:

- In the tourist-historical zone (from the intersection with Piotrkowska Street to the intersection with Wólczańska Street – Nos. 1/3–9 and 2–8)

ulica
6 Sierpnia
Centrum

- Outside the tourist-historical zone (from the intersection with Wólczańska Street to the intersection with Włókniarzy Avenue – Nos. 11–71 and 10–104)

ulica
6 Sierpnia
Stare Polesie

== Numbering and postal codes ==
- Even numbers: 2–104; in a German source from the World War II period, as Straße der 8. Armee: (Note: Including Herbert Norkus Straße (pre-war Romuald Traugutt and Strzelecka streets, after 1946 Romuald Traugutt Street).) 2–304
- Odd numbers: 1–71; in a German source from the World War II period, as Straße der 8. Armee: (Note: Including Herbert Norkus Straße (pre-war Romuald Traugutt and Strzelecka streets, after 1946 Romuald Traugutt Street).) 1–301
- Postal codes: 90-646: (1–7 odd and 68–104 even), 90-422: (2), 90-415: (4–10 even), 90-606: (9–13 odd), 90-416: (12–20 even), 90-616: (15–33 odd), 90-623: (22–36 even), 90-617: (35–51 odd), 90-637: (38–54 even), 90-636: (53–61 odd), 90-638: (56–66 even), 90-645: (63–71 odd)

== Public transport ==
=== Current state ===
Buses of the Łódź public transport system run along the street from Lucjan Żeligowski Street to Stefan Żeromski Street (according to the permanent route as of June 2024, excluding any temporary route changes and replacement lines):

- daytime lines
  - 65A – since 4 February 2018 – from Łódź Airport (some routes from the loop at the waste sorting plant on ul. Zamiejska) towards Radogoszcz Wschód estate
  - 86A – since 1 July 2018 – from Retkinia towards Łódź Fabryczna railway station
  - 86B – since 1 July 2018 – from Retkinia towards Łódź Fabryczna railway station

There is one bus stop (no. 2156) on the street, located before the intersection with Stefan Pogonowski Street.

=== Past transport ===
In the past, the following transport services operated on 6 Sierpnia Street:

- Daytime tram lines – between Piotrkowska Street (named Adolf Hitler Straße between 1940 and 1945) and Tadeusz Kościuszko Avenue (named Hermann Göring Straße between 1940 and 1945):
  - No. 6 – during World War II from 1942, from Schlageterstraße at Blücherplatz (now Zielona Street at Józef Haller Square) towards Sängerstraße at Christian Wergau Straße (now Walery Wróblewski Street at Proletariacka Street) and back;
  - No. 7 – from 22 October 1945 to 25 October 1950 – from 9 Maja Square (now Józef Haller Square) to Chojny, ending at Śląska Street and back. The tracks on 6 Sierpnia Street were decommissioned on 26 October 1950;
  - No. 14 – during World War II from 14 December 1939 (the day tram services resumed after suspension on September 9) to 1942 (when replaced by line 6) – from Józef Haller Square (named Blücherplatz from 1940) towards Kątna Street (named Sängerstraße from 1940, now Walery Wróblewski Street) at Proletariacka Street (named Grafenweg in 1940, later Christian Wergau Straße until 1945);
  - No. 17 – from 26 October 1927 (the first day of operation on the tracks along 6 Sierpnia Street) to 8 September 1939 (the following day, the German occupation authorities suspended tram services) – from Fryderyk Sellin Square (named Józef Haller Square from 1930) towards Władysław Reymont Square and back.
- Daytime bus lines:
  - No. 52 – from 10 August 1992 to 25 July 1999 – from Stare Chojny towards Norbert Barlicki Square – on the segment from Lucjan Żeligowski Street to Mała Street;
  - No. 65 – from 10 August 1992 to 21 June 1998 – from Nowe Sady towards the loop on Bazarowa Street – on the segment from Lucjan Żeligowski Street to Stefan Żeromski Street. From 22 June 1998 to 23 May 2000 – from Nowe Sady towards Powstańców Roundabout – on the segment from Włókniarzy Avenue to Stefan Żeromski Street. From 14 September 1998 on the segment from Lucjan Żeligowski Street to Stefan Żeromski Street. From 24 May 2000 to 30 April 2004 – from Nowe Sady (some routes from Łódź Airport starting 1 February 2004) towards Radogoszcz Wschód estate – on the segment from Lucjan Żeligowski Street to Stefan Żeromski Street. From 1 May 2004 to 1 April 2017 – from Łódź Władysław Reymont Airport towards Radogoszcz Wschód estate – on the segment from Lucjan Żeligowski Street to Stefan Żeromski Street;
  - No. 65A – from 1 May 2004 until its termination on 1 July 2016 – from Nowe Sady towards Radogoszcz Wschód estate – on the segment from Lucjan Żeligowski Street to Stefan Żeromski Street;
  - No. 73 – from 26 July 1999 to 1 April 2017 – from Radogoszcz Zachód estate towards Norbert Barlicki Square – on the segment from Lucjan Żeligowski Street to Stefan Żeromski Street;
  - No. 74 – from 6 July 1992 (the day of reactivation) to 22 June 1997 – from Nowe Złotno towards Norbert Barlicki Square – on the segment from Stefan Żeromski Street to Mała Street (without a stop). From 23 June 1997 to 25 July 1999 – from Huta Jagodnica towards Norbert Barlicki Square – on the segment from Stefan Żeromski Street to Mała Street (without a stop);
  - No. 79 – from 1 January 2001 (the day of reactivation) to 1 April 2017 – from Radogoszcz Wschód estate towards Norbert Barlicki Square – on the segment from Lucjan Żeligowski Street to Stefan Żeromski Street;
  - No. 86 – from 10 August 1992 to 1 April 2017 – from Retkinia towards Henryk Dąbrowski Square – on the segment from Lucjan Żeligowski Street to Stefan Żeromski Street. From 2 April 2017 to 30 June 2018 – from Retkinia towards Łódź Fabryczna station – on the segment from Lucjan Żeligowski Street to Stefan Żeromski Street;
  - No. 89 – from 26 July 1999 to 4 July 2000 – from Radogoszcz Wschód estate towards Norbert Barlicki Square – on the segment from Lucjan Żeligowski Street to Stefan Żeromski Street.

== Bibliography ==
- Betlej, Michał; Radziejowska, Aleksandra (2016). Rusak, Zbigniew (ed.). "Rozwój idei stref woonerf w Polsce na przykładzie miasta Łodzi" (PDF). Autobusy. Technika, Eksploatacja, Systemy Transportowe (in Polish). 17 (6). Radom: Spatium. ISSN 1509-5878. Archived from the original (PDF) on 2020-03-22.
- Kędzierski, Dariusz (2014). Romanowski, Gustaw (ed.). "Ulica 6 Sierpnia. Niegdyś Benedykta". Kronika Miasta Łodzi (in Polish). 4. Łódź: Urząd Miasta Łodzi. ISSN 1231-5354.
- Pawlak, Wacław (1984). W rytmie fabrycznych syren. Łódź między wojnami (in Polish) (I ed.). Łódź: Wydawnictwo Łódzkie. ISBN 83-218-0364-4.
- Straßenverzeichnis von Litzmannstadt (PDF) (in German) (1 ed.). Łódź: Herausgegeben vom Oberbürgermeister von Litzmannstadt Statistisches. 1941.
- Żumański, Antoni, ed. (1939). Księga adresowa miasta Łodzi i województwa łódzkiego z informatorami m. stoł. Warszawy, wojew. krakowskiego, wojew. kieleckiego, wojew. lwowskiego, wojew. poznańskiego, wojew. pomorskiego z m. Gdynią i wojew. śląskiego. Rocznik 1937–1939 (PDF). Wykaz mieszkańców miasta Łodzi [A – K] (in Polish) (I ed.). Łódź: Wydawnictwo Księgi Adresowej.
- "Obwieszczenie Starosty Grodzkiego Śródmiejsko-Łódzkiego z dnia 2 grudnia 1949 r. w sprawie nazw ulic" (PDF). Dziennik Wojewódzki m. Łodzi (in Polish). 25. Łódź: Zarząd Miejski w Łodzi. 1949-12-15.
- Podręczny Rejestr Handlowy 1926 (PDF) (in Polish). Łódź: Nakładem Wydawnictwa Księgi Prawomocnych Podpisów Przemysłu, Handlu i Finansów. 1926.
