= Łódź City Council =

Local government body in Łódź, Poland

City Council in Łódź Rada Miejska w Łodzi

Type
- Type: Unicameral

Leadership
- Chairman: Bartosz Domaszewicz, KO
- Vice-Chairpersons: Paulina Setnik, KO; Krzysztof Stasiak, PiS; Agnieszka Wieteska, NL

Structure
- Seats: 37
- Political groups: Mayoral coalition (28): Civic Coalition (20); New Left (5); Modern (3); Opposition (9): Law and Justice (6); Independent (3)

Elections
- Voting system: Multi-member electoral districts with five-year terms
- Last election: 7 April 2024
- Next election: 2029

Meeting place
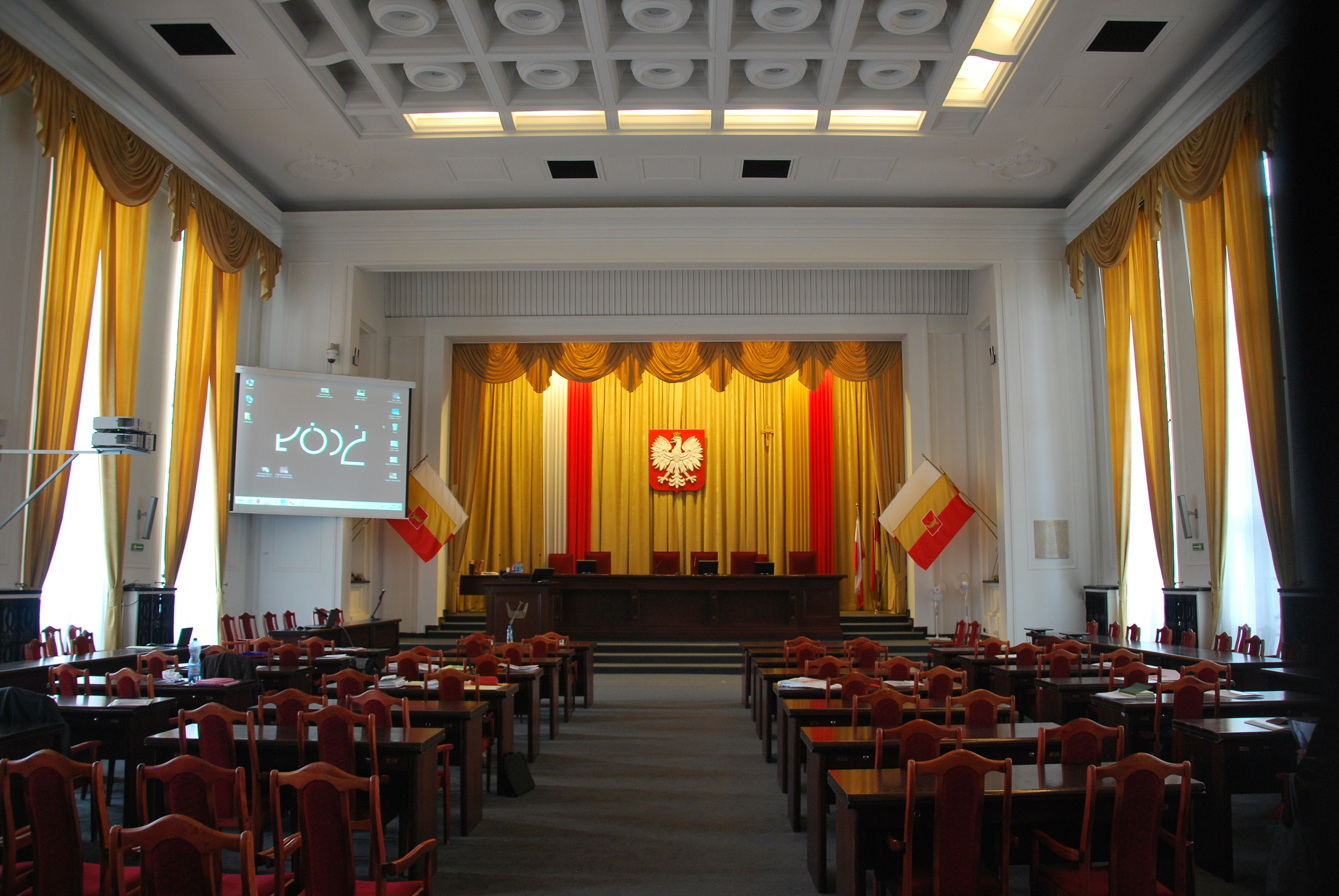

Website
- uml.lodz.pl/urzad-miasta-lodzi/rada-miejska-w-lodzi/

The Łódź City Council is the governing body of the city of Łódź in Poland. The council has 37 elected members elected every five years in an election by city voters through a secret ballot. The election of City Council and the local head of government, which takes place at the same time, is based on legislation introduced on 20 June 2002.

== Members of the Łódź City Council ==
Party	District 1	District 2	District 3	District 4	District 5	District 6	District 7
Civic Coalition	Bartosz Domaszewicz; Agnieszka Wieteska; Emilia Susniło-Gruszka; Mateusz Walasek	Tomasz Kacprzak; Krzysztof Makowski; Marta Przywara; Magdalena Gałkiewicz	Marcin Gołaszewski; Karolina Kępka; Maja Włodarczyk; Elżbieta Żuraw	Adam Wieczorek; Paulina Setnik; Marcin Hencz; Kamila Ścibor	Małgorzata Moskwa-Wodnicka; Damian Raczkowski; Joanna Budzińska; Justyna Chojnacka-Duraj	Hanna Zdanowska; Tomasz Frączak; Maciej Rakowski; Ewa Bujnowicz-Zelt	Adam Pustelnik; Katarzyna Wachowska; Marcelina Hamczyk; Bogusław Hubert
Law and Justice	Sebastian Bulak	Piotr Cieplucha	Marek Michalik	Radosław Marzec	Marcin Buchali	Włodzimierz Tomaszewski; Tomasz Anielak	Krzysztof Stasiak
Third Way					Kosma Nykiel		

== Election results ==
=== 2024 ===
All seats on the city council were being contested in the 2024 election. The number of seats was lowered from 40 to 37.

Party	Votes	%	+/–	Seats	+/–
Civic Coalition (Note: Including New Left.)	139,428	57.65	−4.45	28	−3
Law and Justice	56,701	23.44	−1.03	8	0
Third Way (Note: Including Left Together.)	23,022	9.52	+6.91 (Note: Compared to the result of Yes! in 2018.)	1	0
Confederation and Nonpartisan Localists	14,559	6.02	+3.95	0	0
Self-Government Coalition Energy of Łódź	5,779	2.39	New	0	New
National Action	2,359	0.98	+0.40	0	0
Total	241,848	100.00	–	37	–
Source: National Electoral Commission

=== 2018 ===
All 40 seats on the city council were being contested in the 2018 election.

Party	Votes	%	+/–	Seats	+/–
Committee of Hanna Zdanowska	183,383	62.10	+8.41 (Note: Compared to combined 2014 results of Civic Platform and SLD Left Together.)	32	+5
Law and Justice	72,267	24.47	−2.39	8	−5
Kukiz'15	13,080	4.43	New	0	New
Yes!	7,712	2.61	New	0	New
Freedom #MuremZaŁodzią	6,127	2.07	−2.14	0	0
Committee of Agnieszka Wojciechowska - Nonpartisans	4,548	1.54	New	0	New
Nonpartisan Łódź	3,964	1.34	−0.77	0	0
Nonpartisans - Piotr Misztal	2,165	0.73	−0.34	0	0
National Action	1,705	0.58	−0.50	0	0
Law and Power	336	0.11	New	0	New
Total	295,287	100.00	–	40	–
Source: National Electoral Commission

=== 2014 ===
All seats on the city council were being contested in the 2014 election. The number of seats was lowered from 43 to 40.

Party	Votes	%	Seats
Civic Platform	79,735	39.63	20
Law and Justice	54,052	26.86	13
SLD Left Together	28,284	14.06	7
Polish People's Party	10,680	5.31	0
New Right – Janusz Korwin-Mikke	8,462	4.21	0
Łodzianie Without Party	4,816	2.39	0
Nonpartisan Łódź	4,251	2.11	0
Committee of John Godson	3,964	1.97	0
Your Movement	2,280	1.13	0
National Movement	2,182	1.08	0
Nonpartisan Bloc of Piotr Misztal	2,148	1.07	0
Vote 4 Weno!	353	0.18	0
Total	201,207	100.00	40
Source: National Electoral Commission

=== 2010 ===
All 43 seats on the city council were being contested in the 2014 election.

Party	Votes	%	Seats
Civic Platform	77,647	38.75	23
Democratic Left Alliance	46,561	23.24	11
Law and Justice	44,245	22.08	9
Łódź Civic Association	10,846	5.41	0
Committee of Prof. Zdzisława Janowska	7,458	3.72	0
Polish People's Party	4,770	2.38	0
National Breakthrough Movement	2,855	1.42	0
KOP - Alternative	1,507	0.75	0
National-Catholic Łódź Community	1,003	0.50	0
Our Home Poland - Self-Defence of Andrzej Lepper	925	0.46	0
Committee of Teresa Białecka-Krawczyk	894	0.45	0
Committee of Janusz Rutkowski New Lifestyle "Healthy, Comfortable, Tasty and Happy"	864	0.43	0
Association Initiative of Reasonable Poles	443	0.22	0
Civic Association "Our Łódź"	353	0.18	0
Total	200,371	100.00	43
Source: National Electoral Commission

=== 2006 ===
All 43 seats on the city council were being contested in the 2006 election.

Party	Votes	%	Seats
Civic Platform	67,132	30.90	16
SLD+SDPL+PD+UP Left and Democrats	53,081	24.43	11
Law and Justice	46,635	21.47	14
ŁPO of Jerzy Kropiwnicki	21,069	9.70	2
Self-Defence of the Republic of Poland	5,241	2.41	0
League of Polish Families	4,618	2.13	0
Real Politics Union	2,922	1.35	0
Polish People's Party	2,153	0.99	0
Association Initiative of Reasonable Poles	387	0.18	0
Other committees	13,999	6.44	0
Total	217,237	100.00	43
Source: National Electoral Commission

=== 2002 ===
All 43 seats on the city council were being contested in the 2002 election.

Party	Votes	%	Seats
Democratic Left Alliance – Labour Union	53,009	33.61	21
League of Polish Families	27,178	17.23	9
Łódź Civic Association	19,664	12.47	6
Self-Defence of the Republic of Poland	18,815	11.93	6
Justice for Citizens	12,652	8.02	1
Conservative-Liberal Party Real Politics Union	5,633	3.57	0
Polish People's Party	2,178	1.38	0
Other committees	18,602	11.79	0
Total	157,731	100.00	43
Source: National Electoral Commission
