= Łódź Cathedral =

Cathedral in Łódź Voivodeship, Poland

Coordinates: 51.7488°N 19.4596°E

Archcathedral Basilica of St. Stanislaus Kostka
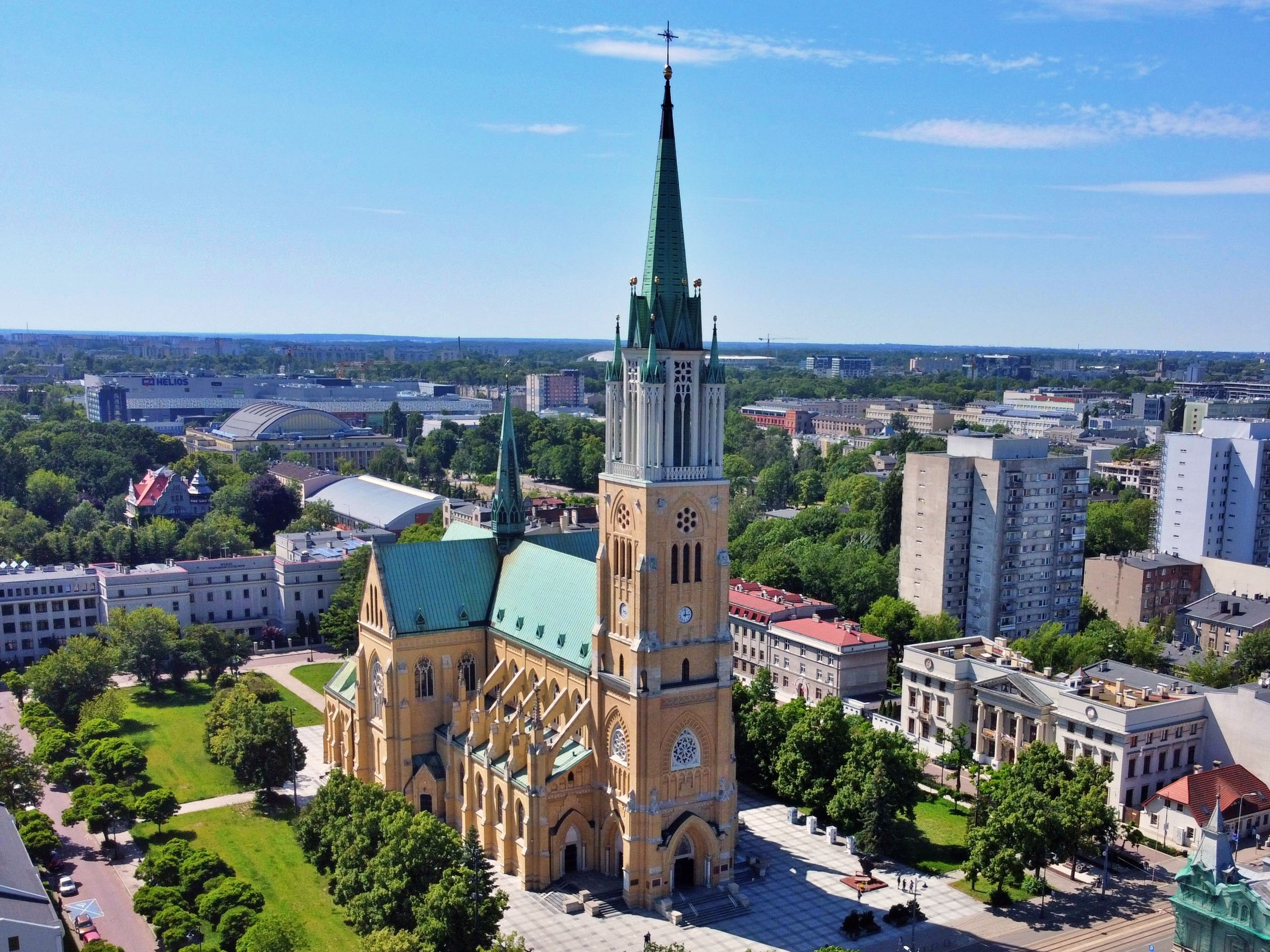
- Łódź Cathedral

Religion
- Affiliation: Roman Catholicism
- Status: active church

Location
- Location: Łódź, Poland
- Interactive map of Archcathedral Basilica of St. Stanislaus Kostka

Architecture
- Architect: Emil Zillmann
- Type: Neo-Gothic
- Groundbreaking: 1901
- Completed: 1912
- Height (max): 104.5 metres

Archcathedral Basilica of St. Stanislaus Kostka is an archcathedral basilica located in Łódź, Łódź Voivodeship; in Poland.

== History ==
The building committee was called in 1895. The cornerstone was blessed on June 16, 1901, by Bishop of Warsaw Wincenty Teofil Popiel. The building was built out of non-plastered brick, in the Rohbau architectural style, by which the church was built between 1901 and 1912, following the plans of the Wende i Zarske firm. The construction of the church was co-led by Berliner Emil Zillmann, with small corrections made by architects: Józef Pius Dziekoński, and Sławomir Odrzywolski-Nałęcz from Kraków. The naved basilica is based on the Ulm Minster in Ulm, Germany. The archcathedral in Łódź, is the tallest building in the city, with a height of 104.5 metres, and is one of the highest churches in Poland.
