= Wojskowa Komenda Uzupełnień =

Wojskowa Komenda Uzupełnień (WKU, translated variously as Army Recruiting Command or Military Replenishment Council) is a unit of military administration in Poland, dealing with military draft. It is subordinate to the local representatives of Ministry of National Defence.
