= Łódź Radogoszcz Zachód railway station =

Commuter railway station in Łódź, Poland

Łódź Radogoszcz Zachód

General information
- Location: Łódź, Bałuty district Poland
- Coordinates: 51.8220°N 19.4158°E
- System: Commuter Station
- Lines: Łódź Circular Line; 15 Łódź - Bednary Line
- Platforms: 2
- Tracks: 2

Construction
- Accessible: elevators

History
- Opened: 17 December 2013

Services
Preceding station	Polregio	Following station
Zgierz towards Toruń Główny	PR	Łódź Żabieniec towards Łódź Kaliska
Preceding station	ŁKA	Following station
Łódź Żabieniec towards Łódź Widzew	Łódź - Toruń	Zgierz towards Toruń
Łódź Żabieniec towards Łódź Widzew	Łódź - Łowicz	Zgierz towards Łowicz Główny
Łódź Żabieniec towards Łódź Fabryczna	Łódź Widzew - Łódź Kaliska - Zgierz	Zgierz Terminus
Location

Łódź Radogoszcz Zachód (English: Łódź Radogoszcz West) is a commuter railway station located in Łódź, in Bałuty district, between Zgierz and Łódź Żabieniec stations. It was built in early 2010s and opened in 2013 as part of Łódź Commuter Railway project. It serves only regional and commuter trains running from Łódź Kaliska station toward Łowicz and Kutno, as well as routes over the railway ring between Zgierz and Łódź Widzew stations. It bears the name after the estate, located right next to the station.
