= Łódź Żabieniec railway station =

Railway station in Poland

Coordinates: 51°47′37″N 19°24′25.6″E

Łódź Żabieniec
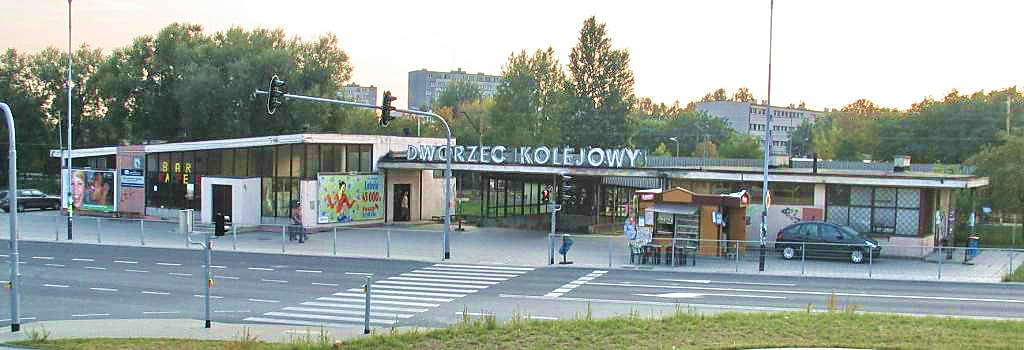
- Łódź Żabieniec station in 2006

General information
- Location: Łódź, Poland
- Owner: Polish State Railways
- Lines: Łódź Circular Line; 15 Łódź - Bednary Line; Łódź Cross-City Line (planned)
- Platforms: 2
- Tracks: 6

History
- Opened: 1951
- Rebuilt: 1972
- Electrified: 1965

Services
Preceding station	PKP Intercity	Following station
Zgierz towards Gdynia Główna	IC	Łódź Kaliska towards Łódź Fabryczna or Bielsko-Biała Główna
Łódź Kaliska towards Katowice	TLK	Zgierz towards Gdynia Główna
Preceding station	Polregio	Following station
Łódź Radogoszcz Zachód towards Toruń Główny	PR	Łódź Kaliska Terminus
Preceding station	ŁKA	Following station
Łódź Kaliska towards Łódź Widzew	Łódź - Toruń	Łódź Radogoszcz Zachód towards Toruń
Łódź Kaliska towards Łódź Widzew	Łódź - Łowicz	Łódź Radogoszcz Zachód towards Łowicz Główny
Łódź Kaliska towards Łódź Fabryczna	Łódź Widzew - Łódź Kaliska - Zgierz	Łódź Radogoszcz Zachód towards Zgierz
Location

Łódź Żabieniec (Polish pronunciation: [ʐaˈbjɛɲɛt͡s]) is a railway station in Łódź, Poland, located in Bałuty district. It serves regional passenger traffic from Łódź Kaliska station to Zgierz, Łowicz, Kutno and Toruń.

== History ==
Initially, in 1910, the site of station served as guard post, securing a single-level crossing between the Warsaw-Kalisz Railway and a tram line between Łódź and Aleksandrów.

The first building at the station was erected in 1951. Five years later a viaduct for Aleksandrowska street and tram tracks were constructed south to the station.

In 1972 the passenger section of the station, consisting of two single-edged platforms and an underground passage between them and the neighbouring streets, was opened south to the viaduct, leaving the already existing part of station for cargo service.

== Current state ==
The station's building was repurposed after 2010, due to closure of cash office. It has been adapted to serve as a restaurant.

The underground passage is notorious for being flooded during heavy rains. Refurbishment of the passage and reconstruction of the platforms began in 2019.

The station is a crucial point for cargo transportation, as it serves branch lines to the production plants located in Teofilów, as well as EC-3 power plant.

== Train services ==
The station is served by the following services:

- Intercity services (IC) Łódź Fabryczna — Bydgoszcz — Gdynia Główna
- Intercity services (IC) Gdynia - Gdańsk - Bydgoszcz - Toruń - Kutno - Łódź - Częstochowa - Katowice - Bielsko-Biała
- Intercity services (TLK) Gdynia Główna — Bydgoszcz/Grudziądz — Łódź — Katowice
