= Zgierz railway station =

Railway station in Zgierz, Poland

Coordinates: 51°50′58″N 19°25′32″E

Zgierz
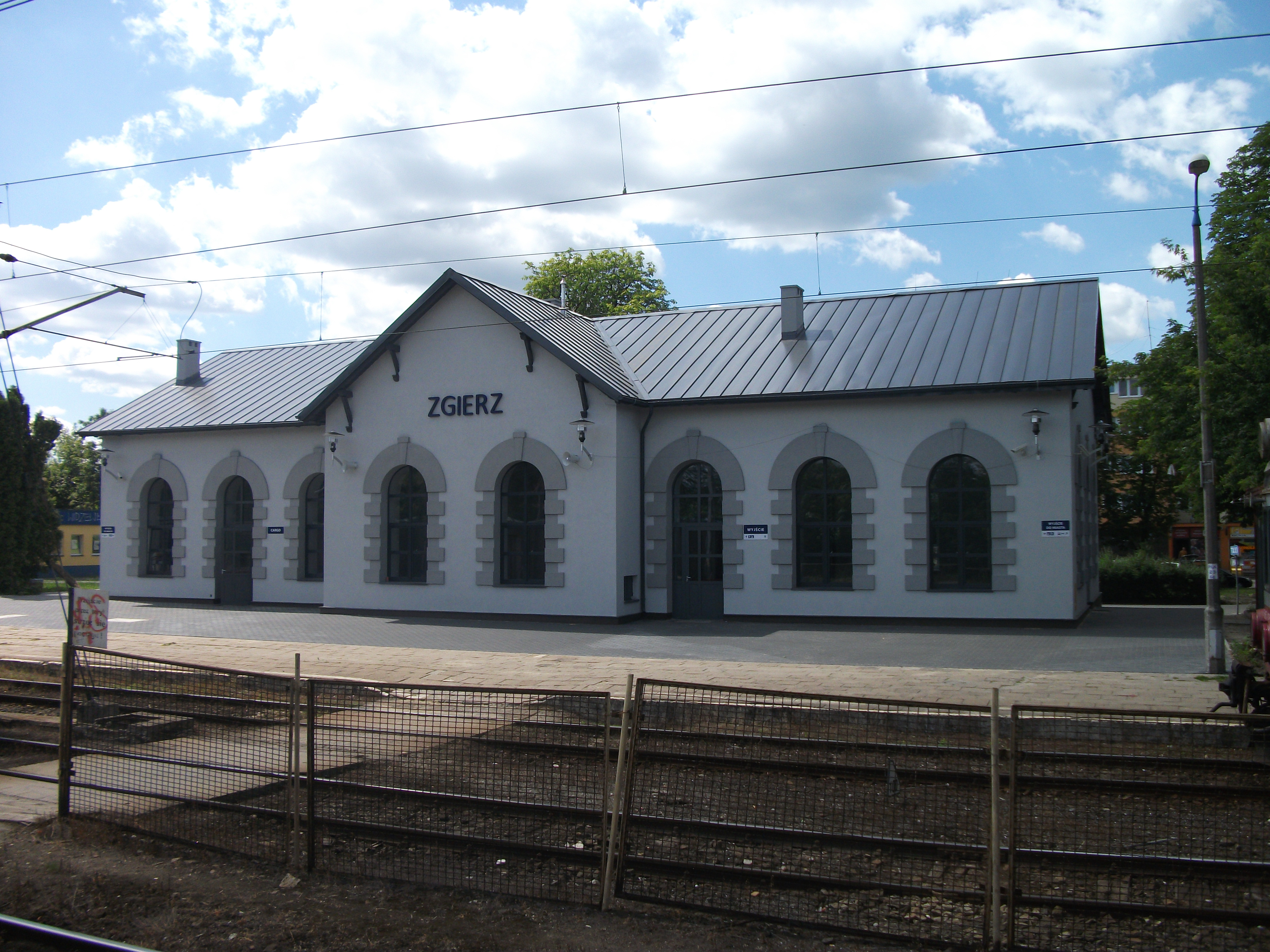
- Main building of the station

General information
- Location: Zgierz, Łódź Voivodeship; Poland
- System: Regional Station
- Owner: Polish State Railways
- Lines: 15 Łódź–Bednary railway; 16 Łódź–Kutno railway
- Platforms: 2
- Tracks: 5

History
- Opened: 1902
- Rebuilt: 1923-1926, 2019-ongoing
- Electrified: 1965
- Former names: Görnau (1940-1945)

Services
| Preceding station | PKP Intercity | Following station |
|---|---|---|
| Ozorków towards Gdynia Główna | IC | Łódź Żabieniec towards Łódź Fabryczna or Bielsko-Biała Główna |
| Łódź Żabieniec towards Katowice | TLK | Ozorków towards Gdynia Główna |
| Preceding station | Polregio | Following station |
| Zgierz Jaracza towards Toruń Główny | PR | Łódź Radogoszcz Zachód towards Łódź Kaliska |
| Preceding station | ŁKA | Following station |
| Łódź Radogoszcz Zachód towards Łódź Widzew | Łódź - Toruń | Zgierz Jaracza towards Toruń |
| Łódź Radogoszcz Zachód towards Łódź Widzew | Łódź - Łowicz | Smardzew towards Łowicz Główny |
| Łódź Radogoszcz Zachód towards Łódź Fabryczna | Łódź Widzew - Łódź Kaliska - Zgierz | Terminus |
| Łódź Radogoszcz Wschód towards Łódź Fabryczna | Łódź Widzew - Zgierz via Stoki | Terminus |
Location

Zgierz is a main railway station for the town of Zgierz, Łódź Voivodeship, serving two major railway lines connecting Łódź with Kutno and Łowicz, as well as being a key station of the railway ring surrounding city of Łódź.

Opened in 1902, it initially served the Warsaw-Kalisz Railway section between Łódź Kaliska and Łowicz stations, but in the 1920s it was rebuilt due to construction of a line between Łódź Widzew and Kutno stations. The main station's building was built in Renaissance Revival style, same as those in Pabianice, Zduńska Wola and Sieradz. The building hasn't changed significantly until the 1980s, when the first refurbishment was made (exterior was plastered, and the interior rearranged) and 2011, when the building went under capital refurbishment. Since 2019 the station goes through another refurbishment.

Currently, the station serves mostly ŁKA commuter trains running from Łódź to Łowicz and Kutno, as well as commuter routes from Łódź Kaliska, Łódź Fabryczna and Łódź Widzew stations as well. It is also a stopping point for PolRegio regional trains running between Łódź and Toruń, as well as PKP Intercity trains running from Gdynia to Katowice.

== Train services ==
The station is served by the following services:

- Intercity services (IC) Łódź Fabryczna — Bydgoszcz — Gdynia Główna
- Intercity services (IC) Gdynia - Gdańsk - Bydgoszcz - Toruń - Kutno - Łódź - Częstochowa - Katowice - Bielsko-Biała
- Intercity services (TLK) Gdynia Główna — Bydgoszcz/Grudziądz — Łódź — Katowice
