= Aleksandrowska Street, Łódź =

Street in Poland

Aleksandrowska Street
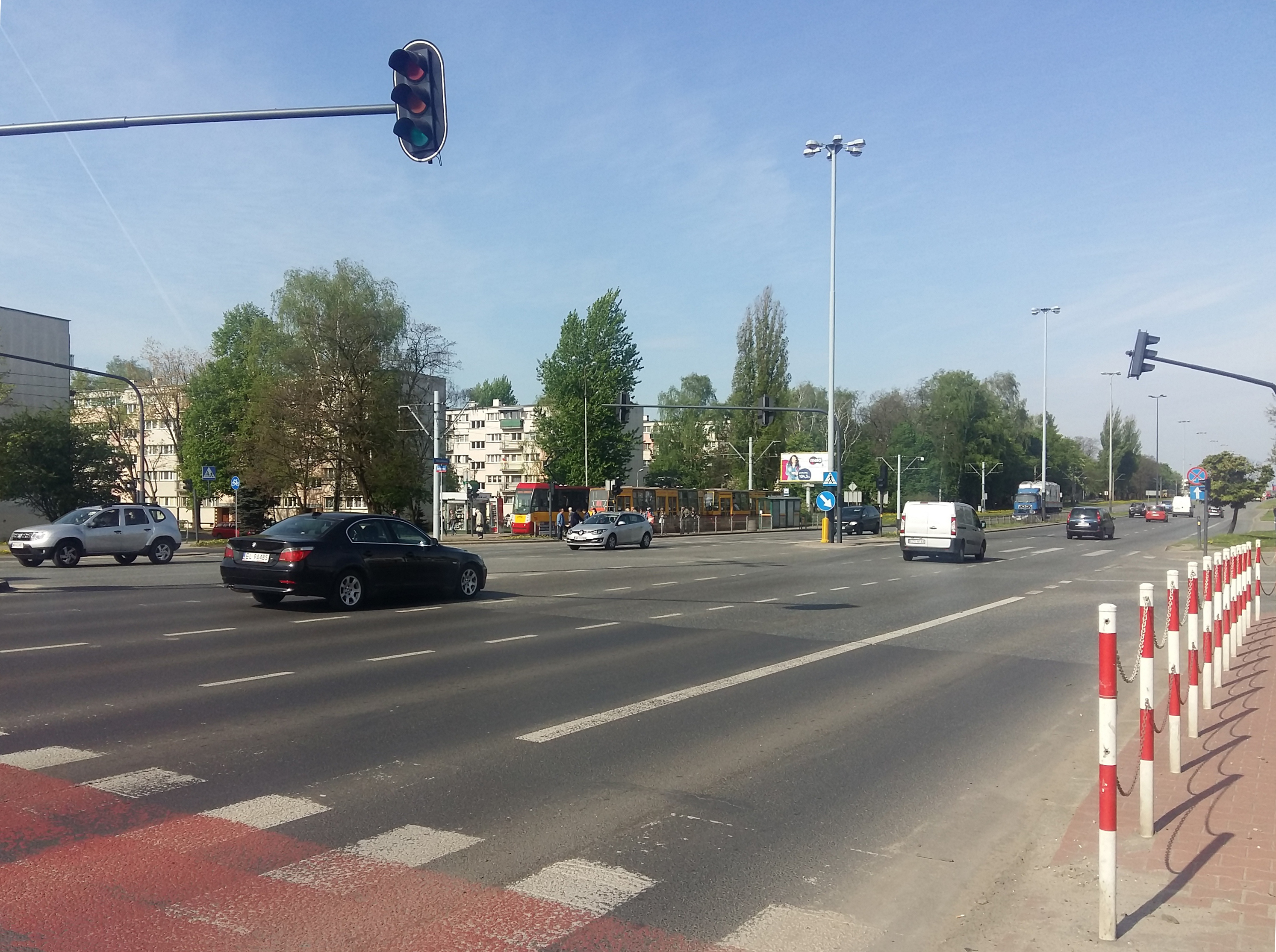
- Aleksandrowska Street as seen from the side of Bolesław Limanowski Street (April 2018)

- Location within Poland
- Part of: Teofilów Przemysłowy, Teofilów, Kochanówka, Romanów
- Length: 5.2 km (3.2 mi)
- Location: Łódź
- Coordinates: 51°47′42.7″N 19°24′22.7″E

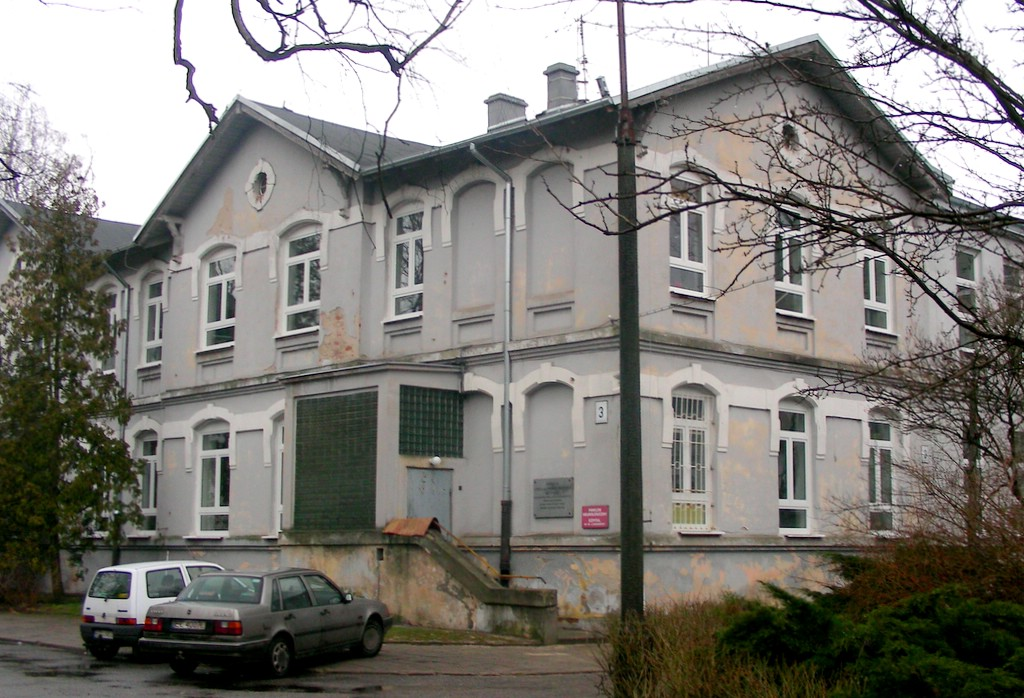
Neurology pavilion of Józef Babiński Hospital (February 2007)

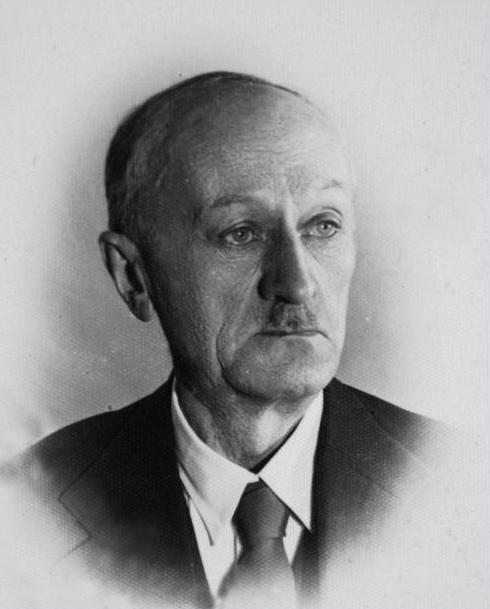
Jan Mazurkiewicz – the first supervisor of Józef Babiński Hospital

Aleksandrowska Street is a street located in the southwestern part of the Bałuty district in Łódź, stretching approximately 5.2 km in length. It begins on a viaduct above the Łódź–Bednary railway as an extension of Bolesław Limanowski Street. Running almost parallel with a slight northern deviation, it ends at the city boundary, transitioning into Wojska Polskiego Street in Aleksandrów Łódzki. Until 1946, the entire street was outside the administrative borders of Łódź.

The street demarcates the boundary between the districts of Teofilów Przemysłowy and Teofilów, as well as Kochanówka and Romanów.

Aleksandrowska Street is part of the national road no. 72 and serves as an exit route towards Konin. It accommodates two-way traffic throughout its entire length. From the viaduct above the Łódź–Bednary railway to house number 127 beyond the intersection with Szczecińska Street, it is a dual road. Along its southern side, up to Chochoła Street, runs a tramway track that terminates in a loop.

The section of Aleksandrowska Street closest to the city center (houses numbered from 10 to 30) falls under the pastoral care of the Roman Catholic Parish of the Immaculate Heart of the Blessed Virgin Mary and St. Anthony Mary Claret. The middle section (houses numbered from 50 to 130) is served by the Roman Catholic Parish of Divine Mercy, while the farthest section (houses numbered from 117 to 203 and from 162 to 246) belongs to the Roman Catholic Parish of Our Lady of Perpetual Help.

== History ==
=== Until 1918 ===
Measuring approximately 5.2 km in length, Aleksandrowska Street was originally part of a new route established between 1858 and 1860 to connect the newly founded city of Aleksandrów with the Bałuty settlement on the outskirts of Łódź and with Łódź itself. This route was called the Road to Aleksandrów or the Aleksandrowska Road. It began in Aleksandrów and ended at the newly established Bałuty Market. Thus, it also included today's Wojska Polskiego Street in Aleksandrów Łódzki and Bolesław Limanowski Street in Łódź, but was entirely outside the administrative boundaries of Łódź. For over a quarter of a century, it was a dirt road that was difficult to travel on in summer due to sands, and in spring and autumn due to mud. It was not until 1886–1887 that work was carried out to harden it.

On 17 September 1902, a Hospital for the Mentally and Nervously Ill Kochanówka (now the Specialist Psychiatric Health Care Facility in Łódź – Józef Babiński Hospital) was opened on the Aleksandrowska Road, far from the city, in a wooded area. The owner of the estate where the hospital was built was named Kochański – both the estate and the hospital took their names from him. The institution owes its creation to the initiative of the Łódź Christian Charity Society and the Łódź doctor, Dr. Karol Jonscher, and upon its opening became one of the most important psychiatric centers in the Congress Poland at the time. The hospital's construction was mainly funded by public donations, with the city council allocating 5,000 rubles for this purpose. During the revolution in the Kingdom of Poland, the hospital – thanks to the stance of its director, Dr. Jan Mazurkiewicz – became a refuge for many revolutionaries (including Tytus Filipowicz) from arrest by the Okhrana.

From 1900 to 1902, a broad-gauge (1,524 mm) line of the Warsaw–Kalisz Railway was built. It intersected the Aleksandrowska Road, creating a level crossing. The line on this section was then single-track and opened on 15 November 1902. On 18 October 1906, Łódź annexed, among other places, the Żubardź colony, resulting in a short, 440-meter section of the Aleksandrowska Road – from the intersection with Graniczna Street (now Sprawiedliwa Street) to the vicinity of the intersection with what was later named Mokra Street – becoming part of the city's boundaries (now this section is part of Bolesław Limanowski Street).

On 9 February 1910, the Łódź Narrow-Gauge Electric Suburban Railways Society inaugurated an 11.13 km long electric suburban tram route, running from Żabieniec on the Warsaw–Kalisz Railway line to the Market (now Tadeusz Kościuszko Square) in Aleksandrów, which at that time – after losing its town rights in 1869 – was a settlement in the Brużyca Wielka commune. From February 25 of that same year, trams started from a passing loop on Zgierska Street between Church Square and Bałuty Market, and the route to Aleksandrów had a single track (with passing loops), intersecting with the Warsaw–Kalisz Railway line. Instead of a line number, the trams had a direction board. The route was divided into three fare zones: I – to the Warsaw–Kalisz Railway line, II – to Kochanówka, and III – to Aleksandrów. During the construction of the line in 1898, two traction substation buildings were erected on Aleksandrowska Road, in the area of today's intersection with Bielicowa Street. They were located by the track, about 20 m north of the present blocks at 14 Aleksandrowska Street (block 9) and 16 Aleksandrowska Street (block 8), and were demolished during the preparations for the construction of the Teofilów residential estate in the early 1960s. The opening of the Aleksandrów line stimulated building activity, especially around Kochanówka, as noted in the spring of 1911. However, the shortage of bricks led to the construction of mainly wooden houses.

At the beginning of the second decade of the 20th century, the Łódź Children's Care Society Gniazdo Łódzkie purchased a plot in the village of Kały on Aleksandrowska Road for the construction of an orphanage. Work began in early spring 1913 and was completed in 1914, shortly before the outbreak of World War I. Due to military actions, the building was burned down in November.

During World War I, in December 1914, the Warsaw–Kalisz Railway line was converted to standard gauge (1,435 mm). The German occupation authorities, by order of the Imperial German President of the Police Mateusz von Oppen on 18 August 1915, annexed to Łódź, among others, Bałuty and Żabieniec – the northwestern boundary of the city was then drawn along the Warsaw–Kalisz Railway line. The Germans also introduced German-language street names – from 1915, the part of Aleksandrowska Road that was within Łódź was named Alexandrower Straße (now Bolesław Limanowski Street), and the part outside the city, beyond the railway crossing, was called Alexandrower Land Straße. During the war, Łódź residents suffered from, among other things, a lack of fuel. As a result, in 1915, abandoned wooden summer villas in the village of Kały, through which Alexandrower Land Straße ran, were completely dismantled for fuel.

=== 1918–1945 ===
After Poland regained independence, the name of the road to Aleksandrów was restored to Aleksandrowska Road in 1918 (the section within the city limits was named Aleksandrowska Street, now Bolesław Limanowski Street).

In 1924, a fundraising campaign was initiated to rebuild the orphanage building in the village of Kały, which had burned down during the war. Three years later, the facility was put into use, and in 1933, it was connected to the electric grid.

On 15 September 1928, Aleksandrowska Road and Aleksandrowska Street (now Bolesław Limanowski Street) to Piwna Street were part of the 211-kilometer seventh stage of the 1st Tour of Poland cycling race organized by Przegląd Sportowy and W.T.C. from Poznań to Łódź. In 1928, the second tram track on Aleksandrowska Street (now Bolesław Limanowski Street) was opened from Zachodnia Street to the Warsaw–Kalisz Railway line and further along Aleksandrowska Road to Kochanówka. (Note: On the network diagrams drawn up by Wojciech Dębski, the second track is only visible from 1939 onwards.) On 14 December 1928, a decision was made to rename Aleksandrowska Street (from Bałuty Market to the city boundary at the Warsaw–Kalisz Railway line) to Bolesław Limanowski Street, which was probably implemented at the beginning of 1929. In 1929, the ŁEWKD Society decided to liquidate the traction substation on Aleksandrowska Road and to provide an overhead power line for the tram traction on the Aleksandrów line from Helenówek, which met with opposition from the Łódź city council. The matter was investigated on-site by a commission including representatives from the Ministry of Communications.

Probably in 1934, the section of Aleksandrowska Road from the railway line intersection westward (still outside the administrative boundaries of Łódź) was named Bronisław Pieracki Street (Note: In the available sources, there is no precise information regarding the length of this section. According to the German-language Verkehrsplan Łódź from 1939, the name Bronisław Pieracki Street covered the section at least up to the intersection with what is now Kaczeńcowa Street. Additionally, in 1934, Ewangelicka Street within the city limits (now Franklin Roosevelt Street) was also renamed to Bronisław Pieracki Street.) – in honor of a legionnaire, a member of the Sejm of the 2nd and 3rd terms of the Second Polish Republic from the Nonpartisan Bloc for Cooperation with the Government, and Minister of the Interior, who died on 15 June 1934 from injuries sustained in an assassination attempt.

During World War II, from 1940 to 1945, the German occupiers introduced the German name Alexanderhofstraße, which covered the entire route to Aleksandrów, starting from Bałuty Market, including the former Bolesław Limanowski Street (within the administrative boundaries of Łódź), Bronisław Pieracki Street, and Aleksandrowska Road (outside the boundaries of Łódź). In 1941, the Germans closed the orphanage in the village of Kały and converted its building into barracks for members of the Hitler Youth, which remained in place until the end of the war.

=== 1945–1989 ===
After the German occupation of Łódź ended, the city's new authorities temporarily reinstated the pre-war name of Bronisław Pieracki Street for the section extending westward from the railway crossing (still outside the boundaries of Łódź). From 17 October 1945 – the day of the official incorporation of the city of Ruda Pabianicka into Łódź – another street named Aleksandrowska appeared within Łódź's boundaries. This street, depicted in the 1939 German Verkehrsplan Łódź, was a short connection between the equally short Olszowa and Wodna streets. On 14 November 1946, it was renamed Kwietniowa Street (by resolution no. 190 of the City National Council of Łódź on 27 May 1946). On 13 February 1946, a government decree from 20 December 1945 regarding the expansion of Łódź's city limits took effect. As a result, the entirety of Bronisław Pieracki Street fell within the city's boundaries and was renamed Aleksandrowska Street on 14 November 1946 by the same resolution of the City National Council. The street began at the railway crossing and ended at the western boundary of Łódź, which at that time intersected the street near the yet-to-be-built Zimna Woda Street.

In 1945, the building of the pre-war orphanage run by the Children's Care Society Gniazdo Łódzkie was taken over by the Social Welfare Department, which entrusted the facility – the State Orphanage Gniazdo – to the care of nuns. Following the incorporation of the village of Kały into Łódź in 1946, the building received the address 123 Aleksandrowska Street. In May 1951, the State Treasury took over the assets of the society, and on 5 January 1952, the facility was renamed Janek Krasicki State Orphanage.

In 1954, the construction of a second track began on Łódź–Bednary railway near Łódź Żabieniec railway station. This led to the revocation of the permit for trams to pass through the railway crossing on their way to Aleksandrów Łódzki. As a result, two tram loops were built at the station (a western loop on Aleksandrowska Street and an eastern loop on Bolesław Limanowski Street), and on June 1, the line was divided into two sections: a Łódź section from the suburban tram loop on Północna Street to the eastern loop and an Aleksandrów section from the western loop to Aleksandrów. Passengers transferred between the two loops by crossing the railway.

On 18 March 1958, Minister of Heavy Industry Kiejstut Żemaitis issued an order to establish the Traction and Crane Apparatus Works (later renamed the Factory of Transformers and Traction Equipment in late 1958). The factory was located at 67/93 Aleksandrowska Street. The cornerstone for the traction equipment production building was laid on 7 April 1959, and construction was completed in 1960. The first assembly hall was put into operation in July 1962, followed by additional halls a year later, and in July 1964, a test station with an engine room and welding shop were completed. By order of Minister Franciszek Waniołka on 2 July 1962, the new plant was named Elta Factory of Transformers and Traction Equipment. In the same year, a vocational school was established at the factory, followed later by a technikum for working students. By the late 1960s and early 1970s, Elta was one of the largest factories of its kind in Poland. An industrial spur from the nearby Łódź–Bednary railway was connected to the factory, running along Ludowa Street and crossing Traktorowa, Kaczeńcowa, and Wersalska streets.

In 1963, construction began on a viaduct in the Bolesław Limanowski and Aleksandrowska streets corridor over Łódź–Bednary railway. This necessitated the closure of the western tram loop at Łódź Żabieniec railway station on October 28 and the establishment of a temporary passing loop on Aleksandrowska Street near Kwiatowa Street (now Bielicowa Street). The eastern loop was also closed, and a temporary loop was set up at the intersection of Bolesław Limanowski and Narodowa streets. The overpass was completed in 1965 and opened to traffic on July 20 in the afternoon, with the first city tram (line 25) traveling from the loop at the intersection of Marceli Nowotka (now Pomorska Street) and Przemyska streets to the new loop at the intersection of Aleksandrowska and Szczecińska streets.

In 1964, the multi-stage construction of the Teofilów housing estate began on a 115-hectare area south of Aleksandrowska Street, between Łódź–Bednary railway and Szczecińska Street. By 1977, a total of 203 residential buildings (5- and 11-story) built using large panel system building, 38 commercial and service pavilions, and 37 garage complexes were constructed. Since 1978, the estate has been managed by the Teofilów Housing Cooperative (established by separating part of the housing resources from the oldest in Łódź, the Lokator Workers' Housing Cooperative). By 2012, it was the largest cooperative in Łódź in terms of housing resources and population. Between the late 1960s and early 1970s, a 4-story Teofil MHD department store was built at 38 Aleksandrowska Street. It opened on 3 March 1971.

On 13 May 1974, the second carriageway of the street from the intersection with Kwiatowa Street (now Bielicowa and Warecka streets) to 127 Aleksandrowska Street beyond the Szczecińska Street intersection was opened to traffic.

On 21 May 1975, the 112-kilometer twelfth stage of the 28th Peace Race (from Berlin through Prague to Warsaw) passed along Aleksandrowska Street (from the city boundary to Traktorowa Street).

On 1 January 1988, following the incorporation of additional suburban areas (including the villages of Romanów, Sokołów, Zimna Woda, and part of the village of Szatonia) and the shifting of Łódź's boundaries based on the 29 June 1987 resolution of the National Council, the length of Aleksandrowska Street increased by over 400 meters – from approximately 4.7 km to nearly 5.2 km.

=== From 1989 ===
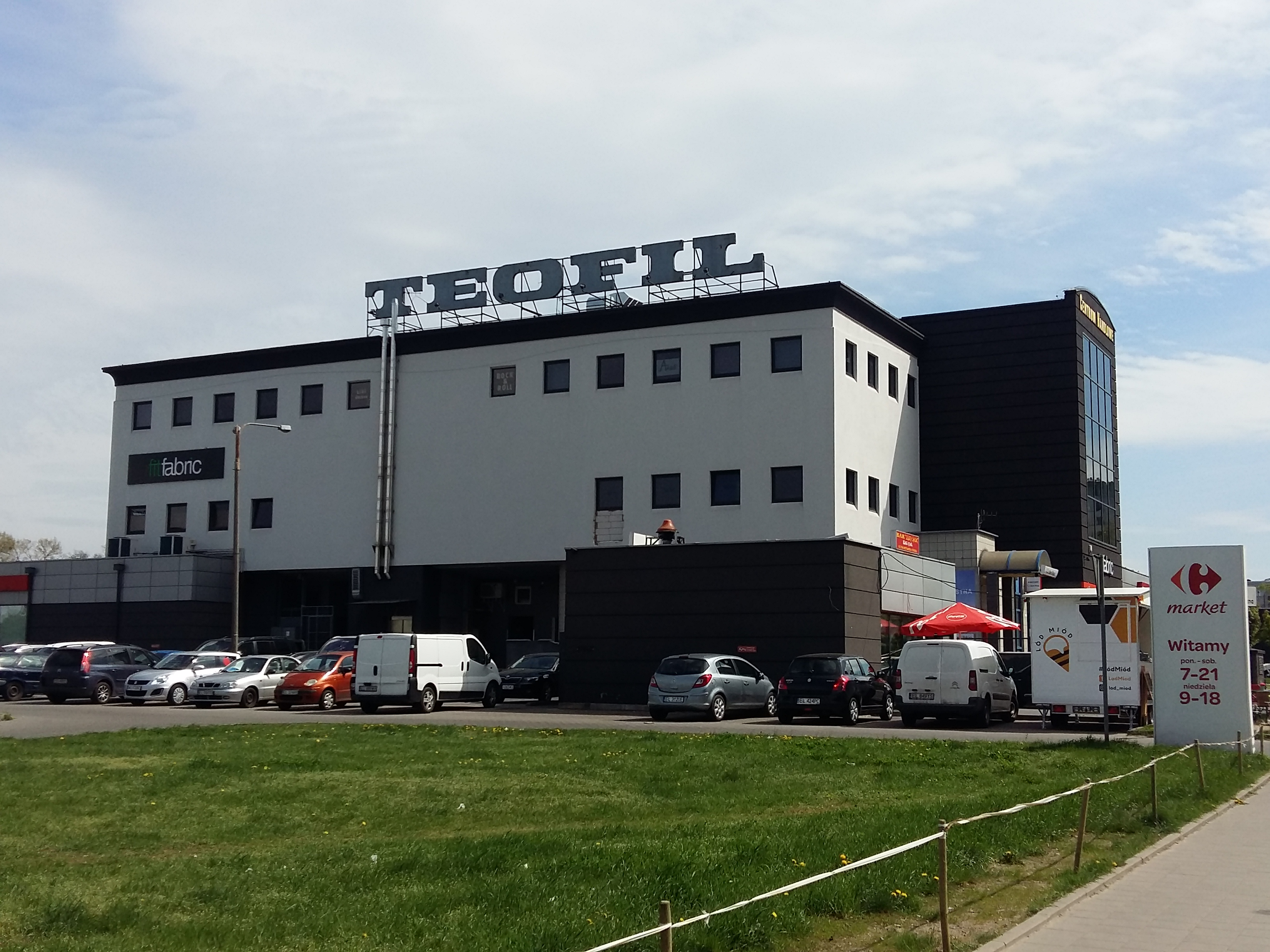
Teofil Shopping Center at 38 Aleksandrowska Street (April 2018)

On 1 April 1991, the suburban tram line no. 44 to Aleksandrów Łódzki was suspended, reducing its route to the loop at the intersection of Aleksandrowska and Chochoła streets. On 1 January 1992, the line was permanently discontinued, and in July 1995, the dismantling of the tracks and associated infrastructure along Aleksandrowska Street beyond the Chochoła intersection began.

In 2003, the former Teofil department store was renovated and modernized, transforming it into the Teofil Shopping Center.

Between 2003 and 2005, a new three-lane section of the road overpass over Łódź–Bednary railway was constructed, and the old southern section was thoroughly renovated, also creating three lanes. This investment was co-financed by the European Union. Since around 2009, plans were made to reconstruct the final single-carriageway section of the street from 127 Aleksandrowska Street to the city boundary to make it dual carriageway like the rest of the street. In 2014, a decision was made to reconstruct it, but retaining a single carriageway, with the timing of the work not specified.

Regarding road safety, between 2011 and 2013, Aleksandrowska Street ranked 13th among 362 streets in Łódź in terms of accidents. During this period, 89 accidents occurred on the street, resulting in 1 death and 110 injuries, including 32 serious injuries. The most dangerous intersections were with Bielicowa and Warecka streets, Szparagowa Street, Traktorowa Street, and Kaczeńcowa Street, with 13, 9, 7, and 6 accidents respectively.

In 2013, Jakub Matusiak presented a concept for rebuilding the suburban tram line connecting Łódź and Aleksandrów Łódzki, starting from the loop at the intersection of Aleksandrowska and Chochoła streets. However, by 2017, this plan had not been included in the investment plans.

On 19 November 2015, a new production and warehouse hall of Amcor Tobacco Packaging Polska was opened at the industrial complex at 55 Aleksandrowska Street.

From 3 November 2017 to 27 March 2018, a comprehensive renovation of the tram tracks on a 700-meter section from Szczecińska Street to the Kochanówka loop was carried out. The tracks and overhead lines were completely replaced, the platforms were raised, and a dual gauge was created at the Lechicka Street stop, improving passenger safety.

=== Chronology of street name changes ===
Period of validity	Name
before 1915	Road to Aleksandrów or Aleksandrowska Road (Note: Entirely outside the administrative boundaries of Łódź.)
1915–1918	Alexandrower Land Straße (Note: Entirely outside the administrative boundaries of Łódź.)
1918–1933	Aleksandrowska Road (Note: Entirely outside the administrative boundaries of Łódź.)
1933–1940	Bronisław Pieracki Street (Note: In the available sources, there is no precise information regarding the length of this section. According to the German-language Verkehrsplan Łódź from 1939, the name Bronisław Pieracki Street covered the section at least up to the intersection with what is now Kaczeńcowa Street. Additionally, in 1934, Ewangelicka Street within the city limits (now Franklin Roosevelt Street) was also renamed to Bronisław Pieracki Street.) (Note: Entirely outside the administrative boundaries of Łódź.) + Aleksandrowska Road (Note: Entirely outside the administrative boundaries of Łódź.)
1940–1945	Alexanderhofstraße (Note: The name covered the entire former route to Aleksandrów, starting from Bałuty Market, which included the pre-war streets Bolesław Limanowski (within the then city limits), Bronisław Pieracki, and Aleksandrowska Road (entirely outside the then administrative boundaries of Łódź).)
1945–1946	Bronisław Pieracki Street (Note: In the available sources, there is no precise information regarding the length of this section. According to the German-language Verkehrsplan Łódź from 1939, the name Bronisław Pieracki Street covered the section at least up to the intersection with what is now Kaczeńcowa Street. Additionally, in 1934, Ewangelicka Street within the city limits (now Franklin Roosevelt Street) was also renamed to Bronisław Pieracki Street.) (Note: Entirely outside the administrative boundaries of Łódź.)
since 1946	Aleksandrowska Street

== Aleksandrowska Street in culture ==
The name Aleksandrowska Street appears (among the names of many other Łódź streets) as the last line in the third verse of the song Łódź – the sixth track on the second album by the band Not, titled NOT, released in 2007 by 2.47 Records.

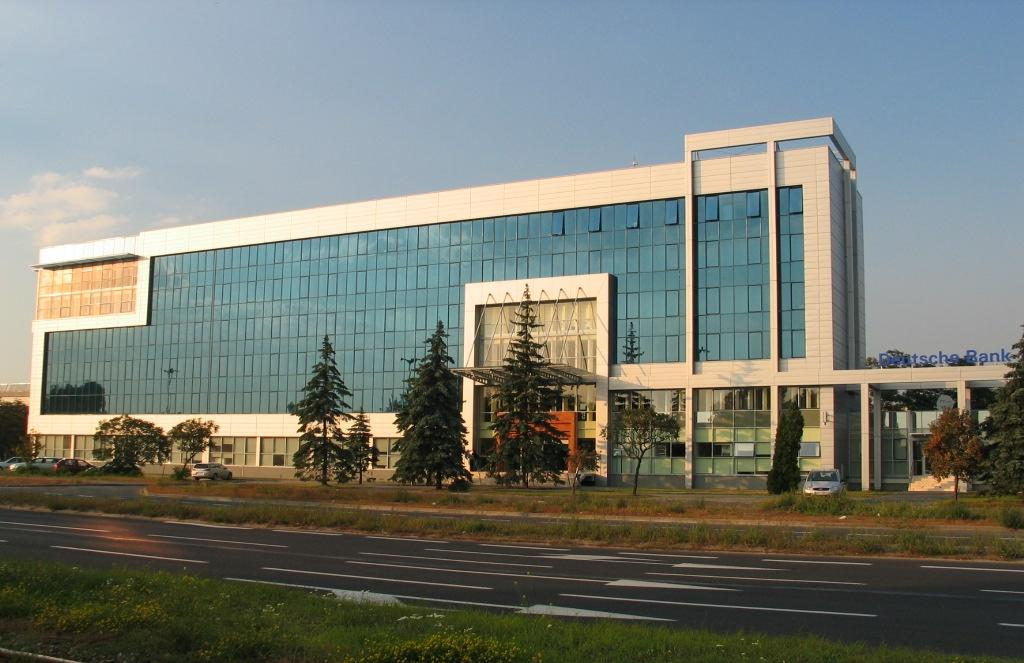
Alexander Plaza at 67/93 Aleksandrowska Street – former office building of the Elta Factory of Transformers and Traction Equipment (September 2006)

== Buildings ==
- No. 13 – villa of Janusz and Paulina Goltz (Golc)
- No. 38 – Teofil Shopping Center
- No. 55 – Amcor Polska – packaging printing house
- No. 61/63 – Provincial Occupational Medicine Center – Preventive and Therapeutic Center
- No. 67/93 – ABB industrial complex, former Elta Factory of Transformers and Traction Equipment; the former Elta office building was modernized between 2004 and 2006 and transformed into Alexander Plaza – a standalone building with office and warehouse space (totaling 6,770 m^{2}) for rent
- No. 123 – Janek Krasicki Orphanage No. 1
- No. 137 – Orphanage No. 2 (relocated on 1 September 1988 from the building of Primary School No. 116 at 2/4 Ratajska Street), situated in an old orchard
- No. 159 – Specialized Psychiatric Health Care Facility in Łódź – Józef Babiński Hospital, former Hospital for the Mentally and Nervously Ill Kochanówka

As of August 2016, two buildings on Aleksandrowska Street were listed in the municipal register of monuments of the city of Łódź: the villa of Janusz and Paulina Goltz (Golc) at No. 13 and the former Kochanówka Hospital for the Mentally and Nervously Ill complex (currently the Specialized Psychiatric Health Care Facility – Józef Babiński Hospital) at No. 159 – including 7 pavilions, 8 wooden villas, a gatehouse, and an entrance gate with a fence.

== Numbering and postal codes ==
- Even numbers: 2–30, 38–130, 162–246
- Odd numbers: 11–13, 47–137, 141–203a
- Postal Codes: 91-120 (even numbers 2–30), 91-201 (odd numbers 11–13), 91-151 (even numbers 38–54), 91-205 (odd numbers 47–137), 91-224 (even numbers 56–130), 91-229 (odd numbers 141–185), 91-154 (149 – Łódź 52 branch), 91-155 (even numbers 162–246 and odd numbers 187–203a)

== Public transportation ==
Aleksandrowska Street is the main transport artery of the southwestern part of Bałuty and one of the main communication routes in Łódź. Along the street, there are two tram loops (at the intersections with Szczecińska and Chochoła streets), 6 tram stops in both directions, 9 westbound bus stops, and 8 eastbound bus stops. The street is served by trams (4 lines) and buses (8 lines) of MPK Łódź, as well as a bus line (1 line) of Zgierz Transport Company Markab (regular routes as of June 2024, excluding any temporary route changes and substitute lines):

- Tram lines:
  - No. 2 – from 1 February 2020 – from Dąbrowa to the loop at the intersection of Aleksandrowska and Chochoła streets and back;
  - No. 8 – from 2 April 2017 – from the loop at Zarzew cemetery to the loop at the intersection of Aleksandrowska and Chochoła streets and back;
  - No. 13 – from 1 January 2001 – from the loop at the intersection of Niższa and Śląska streets to the loop at the intersection of Aleksandrowska and Szczecińska streets and back;
  - No. 16 – from 28 March 2018 (on weekdays) – from the loop at Independence Square to the loop at the intersection of Aleksandrowska and Szczecińska streets and back.
- Daytime bus lines:
  - No. 78 – from 1 September 2022 – from Łódź Żabieniec railway station towards Aleksandrów Łódzki and back – from the viaduct over Łódź–Bednary railway to Traktorowa Street and from Rydzowa Street to the city limits;
  - No. 81 – from 1 February 2000 – from the loop at Stokowska Street near the M1 shopping center towards the cemetery at Szczecińska Street and back – from the viaduct over Łódź–Bednary railway to Traktorowa Street;
  - No. 84A – from 2 April 2017 – from the loop at the intersection of Rojna and Szczecińska streets towards Zielony Romanów and back – from Rydzowa Street to Romanowska Street;
  - No. 84B – from 2 April 2017 – from the loop at the intersection of Rojna and Szczecińska streets towards Aleksandrów Łódzki and back – from Rydzowa Street to the city limits;
  - No. 89 – from 8 August 2016 – from Słoneczny Square on Radogoszcz towards the cemetery at Szczecińska Street and back – from the viaduct over Łódź–Bednary railway to Traktorowa Street;
  - No. 96 – from 28 May 2001 – from Janów towards the loop at the intersection of Rojna and Szczecińska streets and back – from the viaduct over Łódź–Bednary railway to Traktorowa Street.
- Daytime bus line:
  - No. 6 – from Zgierz towards Łódź Kaliska railway station and back – from Kaczeńcowa Street to Rydzowa Street.
- Night bus lines:
  - No. N1A – from 2 April 2017 – from Janów towards Aleksandrów Łódzki and back – from the viaduct over Łódź–Bednary railway to Traktorowa Street and from Szczecińska Street to the city limits;
  - No. N1B – from 2 April 2017 – from Janów towards the loop at the intersection of Rojna and Szczecińska streets and back – from the viaduct over Łódź–Bednary railway to Traktorowa Street.

== Bibliography ==
- Koter, Marek (1980). "Inkorporacje nowych terenów w 1906, 1908 i 1915 r.". In Baranowski, Bohdan; Fijałek, Jan; Rosin, Ryszard (eds.). Łódź. Dzieje miasta. Do 1918 r. Cz. druga: Łódź w latach 1820/1823–1918 (in Polish). Vol. I (I ed.). Warsaw; Łódź: Polish Scientific Publishers PWN. ISBN 83-01-02161-6.
