= Łódź Cross-City Line =

The Łódź Cross-City Line is an under construction railway line running through the centre of the city of Łódź, Poland, intended to connect three major railway stations of the city: Łódź Kaliska, Łódź Fabryczna, and Łódź Widzew. It consists of two sections: an open-air section between Łódź Widzew and Łódź Niciarniana stations, and a tunnel, currently reaching Łódź Fabryczna station.

== Existing sections ==
=== Łódź Fabryczna – Łódź Widzew ===
Historically, this 5.27 kilometres (3.27 mi) long section was opened in 1865 as a part of the Łódź Factory Railway. - a company established by Karl Wilhelm Scheibler and Jan Bloch. The railway allowed Łódź to be served by trains running on the Warsaw–Vienna railway. In 1903 Łódź Widzew station was opened, serving both the "factory line" to Łódź Fabryczna and a circular line leading to Łódź Kaliska station, which operated on different track gauges. The track gauge was unified during World War I. Before World War II a third station - Łódź Niciarniana - was opened. The line was electrified in 1954.

In 2011 the section was closed, as the general reconstruction began. The old buildings of Łódź Fabryczna and Niciarniana stations were demolished, tracks were dismantled, and ground works began. In 2012 the construction of a cross-city tunnel from Łódź Fabryczna to Łódź Niciarniana stations had begun, along with the construction of new stations. These works required replacing a secured level crossing with an underpass for Niciarniana street and replacing the platforms with a new island platform over the underpass. On 11 December 2016 the section was reopened, and is being served by ŁKA commuter trains, Polregio regional trains and PKP Intercity trains.

== Sections under construction ==
=== Łódź Fabryczna – Łódź Kaliska ===
Scheme of planned cross-city tunnel between Fabryczna and Kaliska stations.

In 2009 representatives of the City of Łódź, Government of Łódź Voivodeship, and PKP PLK signed an agreement for creating a feasibility study for building a cross-city tunnels between Łódź Fabryczna and Łódź Kaliska stations: one for regular rail services, other for high-speed rail as part of planned line "Y" from Warsaw through Łódź to Poznań and Wrocław. In 2010, a contract for a feasibility study of a conventional rail tunnel was awarded to the Spanish company, Sener.

The plan for conventional rail tunnel consisted of a double-track tunnel running between Łódź Fabryczna station and railway line no. 15, running between Łódź Kaliska and Łódź Żabieniec stations, with the possibility for both stations to access the tunnel. The plan proposed the construction of two additional stops: Łódź Śródmieście and Łódź Polesie. Łódź Śródmieście will be located under the intersections of Zielona and Zachodnia streets with Kościuszko Avenue. Łódź Polesie is proposed to be located near the intersections of Ogrodowa and Jan Karski streets, near the Manufaktura shopping gallery (former site of I. Poznański's textile factory). The double-track connection with Kaliska and Żabieniec stations will be provided by an underground branch post Łódź Włókniarzy, where the tunnel will split firstly into 2, then into 4 single-track tunnels - a pair for each station. The total length of the tunnel is estimated to be approximately 2.7 kilometres (1.7 mi).

On 28 November 2016 PKP PLK started a bidding process to select the contractor for the design and build of the cross-city tunnel between Fabryczna and Kaliska stations. The maximum cost of the contract was estimated at 2.17 billion PLN, with a proposed construction period of between 48 and 51 months.

In September 2017, the contract was awarded to a consortium of Energopol Szczecin and Przedsiębiorstwo Budowy Dróg i Mostów (eng. Road and Bridges Construction Company) from Mińsk Mazowiecki, starting with an offer estimated at 1.59 billion PLN. The contract was signed on 28 December 2017. In June 2019 Energopol filed for bankruptcy, and the request was approved by Szczecin-Centrum District Court in March 2020. Therefore the majority of the works was put on the second participant of the consortium.

The construction works began in August 2019, starting with the construction of a drill chamber in the area between Odolanowska and Stolarska streets in Polesie district. From there a large tunnel boring machine will begin drilling the double-track tunnel toward western end of Łódź Fabryczna station, while a smaller TBM will make two single-track tunnels between this chamber and the branch post area, along with 4 tunnels to Kaliska and Żabieniec stations. The tunnel is expected to be complete sometime in 2022 or 2023. The construction of smaller chambers near the existing railway line began in 2020. The two TBMs made by the German company Herrenknecht were successfully shipped in December 2019 (small TBM) and February 2020 (large TBM), arriving on the construction site respectively in February and June 2020.

In February 2020 a plan for a third stopping point - Łódź Koziny - was approved. The third stopping point will be located in the place of the second large drilling chamber, located within the quarter of Włókniarzy Avenue, Drewnowska St. and Kasprzaka St, initially set as an underground branch post, with access points near Włókniarzy Avenue and Kasprzaka St. Initially, construction of the stopping point was to be commenced after 2022 as part of second phase of upgrading the railways in Łódź, yet in Q3 of 2020 the station was added to the existing construction schedule.
