= Łódź Niciarniana railway station =

Railway station in Łódź, Poland

Coordinates: 51°46′00″N 19°30′27.2″E

Łódź Niciarniana
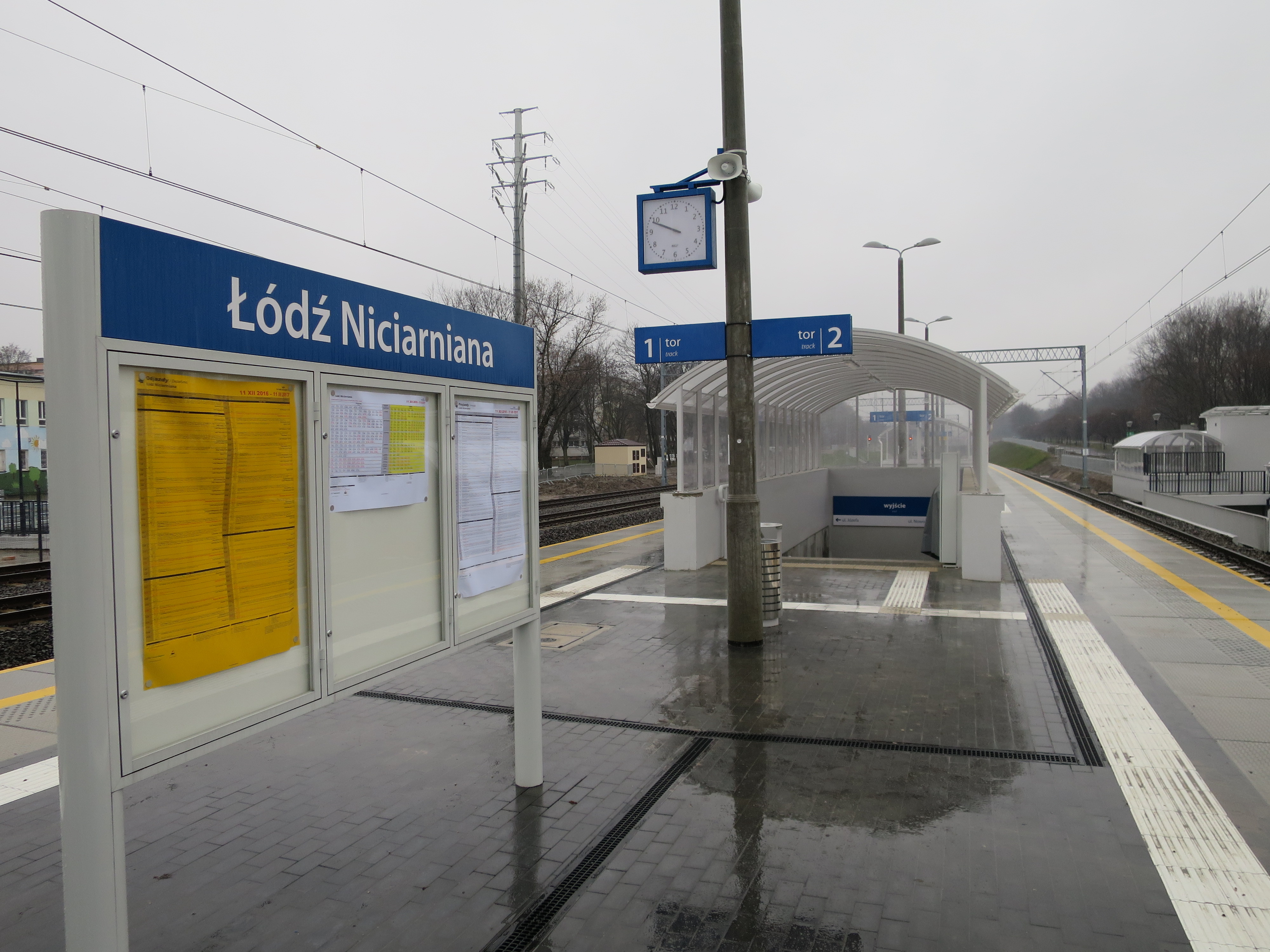
- A platform of the station in 2016

General information
- Location: Łódź, Poland
- System: Commuter Station
- Lines: Łódź Cross-City Line; 17 Łódź-Koluszki railway
- Distance: 2.7 kilometres (1.7 mi) from Łódź Fabryczna station
- Platforms: 1
- Tracks: 2

Construction
- Accessible: elevators

History
- Opened: 1920–1938
- Rebuilt: 2012–2016
- Electrified: 1954
- Former names: Polesie Widzewskie

Services
Preceding station	Polregio	Following station
Łódź Fabryczna Terminus	IR	Łódź Widzew towards Warszawa Główna
Łódź Fabryczna One-way operation	IR	Łódź Widzew towards Łódź Kaliska or Warszawa Główna
Łódź Fabryczna Terminus	PR	Łódź Widzew towards Częstochowa
Preceding station	ŁKA	Following station
Łódź Fabryczna Terminus	Łódź Widzew - Łódź Kaliska - Zgierz	Łódź Widzew towards Zgierz
Łódź Fabryczna Terminus	Łódź Widzew - Zgierz via Stoki	Łódź Widzew towards Zgierz
Łódź Fabryczna Terminus	Łódź - Skierniewice	Łódź Widzew towards Skierniewice
Łódź Fabryczna Terminus	Łódź - Warsaw	Łódź Widzew towards Warszawa Główna or Warszawa Wschodnia
Łódź Fabryczna Terminus	Łódź - Radom	Łódź Widzew towards Radom
Łódź Fabryczna Terminus	Łódź - Skarżysko-Kamienna	Łódź Widzew towards Skarżysko-Kamienna
Łódź Fabryczna Terminus	Łódź - Radomsko	Łódź Widzew towards Radomsko
Łódź Fabryczna Terminus	Łódź - Poznań (jointly operated with Greater Poland Railways)	Łódź Widzew towards Poznań Główny
Location

The Łódź Niciarniana (Polish pronunciation: [ɲit͡ɕarɲana]) is a name assigned to a commuter railway station in the city of Łódź, Poland, located in Widzew district, approximately 2.7 kilometres (1.7 mi) away from Łódź Fabryczna station. The station bears its name after the Niciarniana street, which runs closely to the station.

The station was opened during inter-war period of the 1920s and 1930s as a station for local thread factory workers, it also served a branch line leading to the factory. The current name of the station was given in 1951. From 1951 to 2011 the station was used mainly for regional and commuter services, as well as special trains with football fans arriving for games played on the stadium of Widzew Łódź football club.

On 16 October 2011, the station was closed, and demolished one year later. During the major reconstruction of the railway line between Fabryczna and Widzew stations, the station was rebuilt from scratch, this time in the form of a single island platform located on top of the railway viaduct. The street, which ran next to the station and had a secured crossing before the reconstruction, was routed under the new viaduct.

The new station was opened on 11 December 2016.

== Train services ==
The station is served by the following services:

- InterRegio services (IR) Łódź Fabryczna — Warszawa Glowna
- InterRegio services (IR) Łódź Kaliska — Warszawa Glowna
- Regional services (PR) Łódź Fabryczna — Częstochowa
