= Łódź Fabryczna railway station =

Railway station in Łódź, Poland

Coordinates: 51°46′08″N 19°28′04″E

Łódź Fabryczna
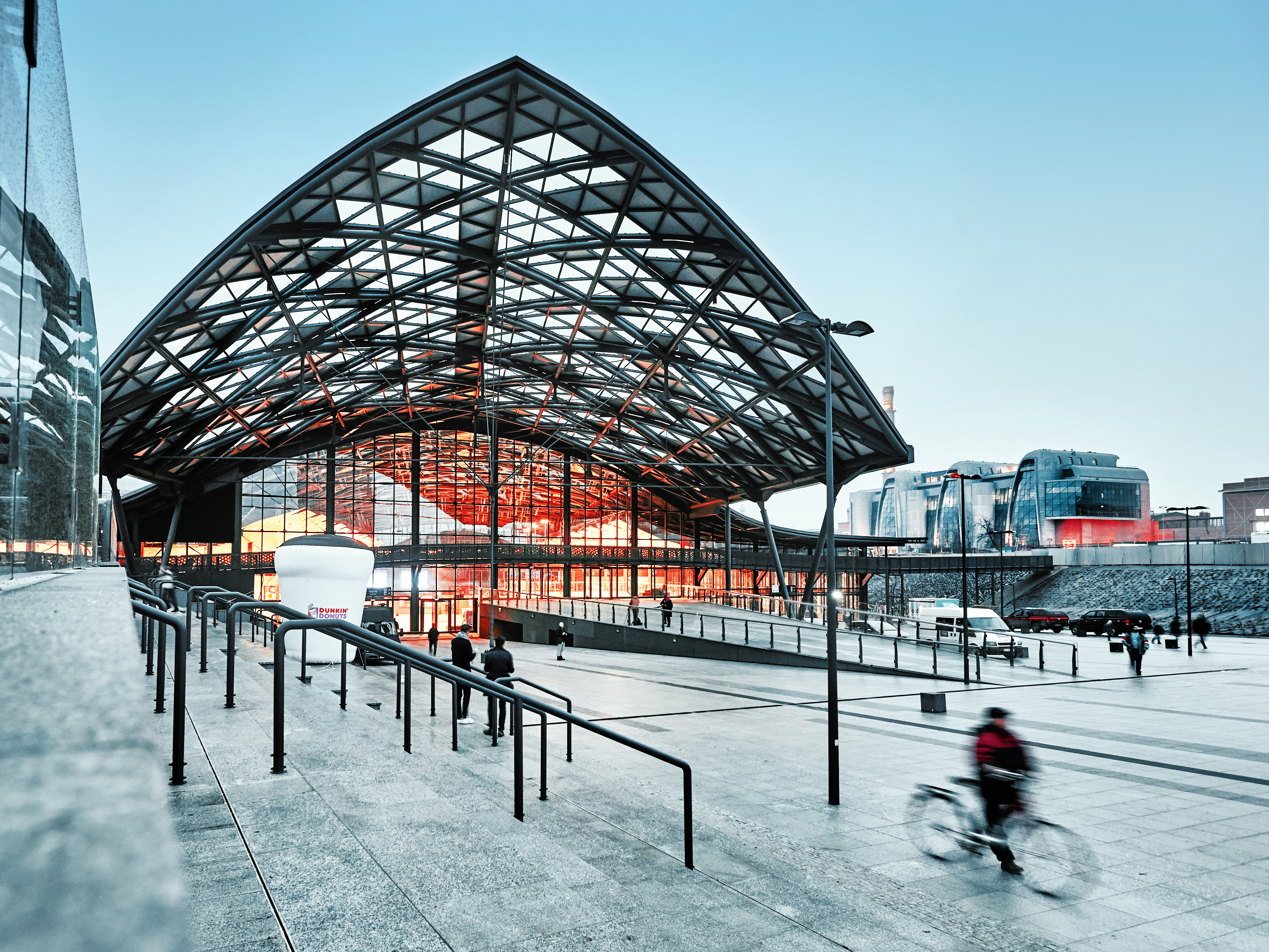

General information
- Location: Bronisław Sałaciński's Square 1, 90-001, Łódź; Poland
- System: Premium
- Owner: Polskie Koleje Państwowe S.A.
- Lines: Łódź Factory Railway (line no. 17); Łódź Cross-city Railway (planned)
- Platforms: 4

History
- Opened: 1866, 2016
- Former names: Litzmannstadt Mitte (1940-1945)

Services
| Preceding station | PKP Intercity | Following station |
|---|---|---|
| Łódź Widzew towards Warszawa Główna or Warszawa Wschodnia | IC | Terminus |
| Łódź Widzew towards Lublin Główny | IC | Terminus |
| Łódź Widzew towards Kołobrzeg | IC | Terminus |
| Łódź Widzew towards Gdynia Główna | IC | Terminus |
| Łódź Widzew towards Kraków Główny | IC | Terminus |
| Preceding station | Polregio | Following station |
| Terminus | IR | Łódź Niciarniana towards Warszawa Główna |
| Łódź Niciarniana towards Łódź Kaliska | IR | Łódź Niciarniana towards Warszawa Główna |
| Terminus | PR | Łódź Niciarniana towards Częstochowa |
| Preceding station | ŁKA | Following station |
| Terminus | Łódź Widzew - Łódź Kaliska - Zgierz | Łódź Niciarniana towards Zgierz |
| Terminus | Łódź Widzew - Zgierz via Stoki | Łódź Niciarniana towards Zgierz |
| Terminus | Łódź - Skierniewice | Łódź Niciarniana towards Skierniewice |
| Terminus | Łódź - Warsaw | Łódź Niciarniana towards Warszawa Główna or Warszawa Wschodnia |
| Terminus | Łódź - Radom | Łódź Niciarniana towards Radom |
| Terminus | Łódź - Skarżysko-Kamienna | Łódź Niciarniana towards Skarżysko-Kamienna |
| Terminus | Łódź - Radomsko | Łódź Niciarniana towards Radomsko |
| Terminus | Łódź - Poznań (jointly operated with Greater Poland Railways) | Łódź Niciarniana towards Poznań Główny |
Location
- Location within Poland

Łódź Fabryczna (Polish pronunciation: [faˈbrɨt͡ʂna]) is the largest and most modern railway station in the city of Łódź, Poland. It was originally constructed at the initiative of industrialist Karl Wilhelm Scheibler in 1865. In the Polish classification of stations it is placed in the Premium category.

The station is located in the centre of Łódź, as a main place of New Centre of Łódź. Trains depart frequently via Koluszki to Warszawa Wschodnia, Kraków, Częstochowa, and Tomaszów Mazowiecki. It was closed on 16 October 2011 as a part of a major redevelopment project to build a new railway station and transport interchange and reopened on 11 December 2016.

== History ==
Building of the Łódź – Koluszki railway line began on 1 September 1865 when the area was part of Congress Poland. Authorization for the construction was obtained from Alexander II in July 1865. The new line linked Łódź with the Warsaw–Vienna railway which was finished in 1848. Rails were laid simultaneously from Łódź and from Koluszki.

The single-gauge railway line of the factory and Lodz was supposed to serve primarily freight transport, in particular for coal and raw materials for the production of machinery. Its hasty launch on 19 November 1865, provided only this function. According to the decisions of the town authorities, two station tracks ended blindly before the Dzika street (presently Sienkiewicza street), where the composition of the coal was established. Passengers of the first goods-passenger trains, launched on 1 June 1866, probably used a provisional barrack between Widzewska St. (now Kilinskiego St.) and Dzika street (the presence of Sienkiewicz St.), however, it was not possible to unambiguously confirm it. the DZFL board's report for 1866 states that the station building in Lodz, as well as other buildings on the line, were finished and put into flight in December of the same year. However, in previous studies, the year 1868 or later years appears as the date of construction of the station. Construction of the railway was the beginning of the creation of the Łódź Circle Line.

The track extended almost to Sienkiewicz Street. In 1868 a new station was built designed by the Warsaw-based architect Adolf Schimmelpfennig. The partly two-storey building did not differ from the typical industrial architecture of railway stations of that period. In addition to the station at the station, brick buildings were erected: a warehouse, a steam engine, a pressure tower, a ramp, a landing, a one-story house and a wooden shed for wagons. Quite accurate plan of the city of Rudolf Micinski, made on the basis of measurements carried out since 1869 and dated on 1873, even shows the course of the tracks: from the main track at the height of Targowa Street outlet left a single-track track, ending with the main track before Dzika Street (nowadays Sienkiewicza Street). In the area of Wodna Street, went to the right ending in front of Widzewska street (nowadays Kilinskiego Street), a track leading to the engine house, the station and the square next to it. A new station has already been marked on the plan, and in the place of the existing pre-race car park at Kilinskiego St. two small warehouses (one of them is a salt warehouse, another, third warehouse was established in 1871 or 1872 to separate arrivals and sentries). In addition, the plan showed the building of the water station and probably a small engine resemble two machines, but they were not marked leading to a non-runway. A small building, probably residential, is on the set at the exit of Targowa Street. In 1874, the building of the engine house was extended to create two additional positions, and the station was begun to be expanded with a fourth class waiting room.

In the years 1875–1876, in order to pass a small steel bridge over the Kielskie street, a small viaduct was built (this is sometimes referred to as a tunnel, this viaduct did not allow the carriage of trucks), which is why in 1912 it was enlarged. It was a typical pedestrian tunnel under the embankment of the Trajmwajowa street. In addition, about 800m of additional tracks were laid, two checkpoints for the turnstiles were erected, a new coal yard and wagons' weight, a cargo ramp and for station employees, a 16-family residential building was erected on Targowa street 1a.

In the years 1877–1878, in the area of Zagajnikowa Street (nowadays Kopcińskiego), it was found to the south, along the edge of the copse, a lateral track to the plants of Karl Scheibler, and at the crossing there was a house of the guard, marked on the north side of the tracks. Subsequent plans of the city from the 1880s seemed to ignore the dynamic changes taking place at the station where there was already a large, though only two-wheeled steam locomotive to six locomotives, adjacent to it a mechanical workshop from Kuznia, erected also in 1880, a three-track, a wooden carriage hall with a 'Vogele' shifter in front of the gates, numerous freight warehouses and exchange offices in the open squares. In 1915 to 1916 the German occupation authorities ordered the demolition of warehouses, coal storages and rail siding along Składowa street. Eventually the work was completed 15 later and the arrangement of large squares on the site of the warehouses was completed in 1933. Tram track along Składowa street was laid in 1937.

The station was extended in 1930. In 1973 platform roofs and front shed were built. They were connected to the main station building.

After the war, the station had passed through further modernization and reconstruction. shortening the tracks, rebuilding the platforms, building a platform shelter, modernizing the interior of the station, demolishing many warehouse buildings around it. This station, despite its planned liquidation or marginalization to the role of a suburban station, was still irreplaceable. Work on it lasted from around 1968 to the end of 1973, with the greatest intensity in the years 1971-1973. For the needs of the Income Control Office, the tenement houses transferred to the railway (in exchange for the buildings at 62 Kilińskiego street demolished in 1971) were adapted at 15 Składowa street.

In June 2012 the station was demolished to make way for the building of a new station below ground level.

=== Rebuilding ===
The modernization of the Łódź – Warsaw line includes building a new station below ground level, just north of the site of the former Łódź Fabryczna station. A ramp, leading to a new tunnel, begins immediately after Łódź Widzew station, and the tunnel itself starts near the site of Łódź Niciarniana station. Initially it was planned to change the name of the station to Łódź-Central or Central, but according to the latest plans, the station name will not change because it is too well associated with the current station.

The station was originally envisaged to service new high-speed trains that were to run on a new high-speed line, the 'Y' line, intended to link Warsaw via Łódź and Kalisz to Wrocław and Poznań. Due to the latest estimated cost of 10 billion Euro, the high-speed line was put on hold by Sławomir Nowak, the Ministry of Transport, Construction and Marine Economy at the time of the decision.

Moving Łódź Fabryczna below ground releases land for development near the city centre. A modern transport interchange is envisaged between PKP trains, MPK Łódź trams, buses and PKS coaches. The railway line is to be extended in a new cross-city twin-track tunnel to Łódź Kaliska railway station.

In November 2010 PKP PLK announced a list of five consortia that had been invited by the railway infrastructure manager to tender to build the underground station. Work was to be completed in 2014.

In 2013 the estimated cost of the project was given as ranging from 1.7 to 1.9 billion PLN and the completion date was unknown. Reconstruction works finished in December 2016 and the station has reopened. The main architect of the new station and multimodal hub is Ewelina Oskroba, an architect specializing in stations and transportation. The new station has been designed to be passenger-friendly, with the possibility to accommodate large numbers of travellers commuting between the train station, bus station, tramways and public parking. Although the station is underground, it was designed since the beginning to have plenty of daylight. The station allows a fluid connection between the different sides of the city and does not create any barrier. One of the initial requests was to allow the construction of eight-storey office buildings over the future station.

== Train services ==
The station is served by the following services:

- Intercity services (IC) Łódź Fabryczna — Warszawa Główna/Warszawa Wschodnia
- Intercity services (IC) Łódź Fabryczna — Warszawa — Lublin Główny
- Intercity services (IC) Łódź Fabryczna — Warszawa — Gdańsk Glowny — Kołobrzeg
- Intercity services (IC) Łódź Fabryczna — Bydgoszcz — Gdynia Główna
- Intercity services (IC) Łódź Fabryczna — Tomaszów Mazowiecki/Częstochowa — Kraków Główny
- InterRegio services (IR) Łódź Fabryczna — Warszawa Glowna
- InterRegio services (IR) Łódź Kaliska — Warszawa Glowna
- Regional services (PR) Łódź Fabryczna — Częstochowa

== Gallery ==
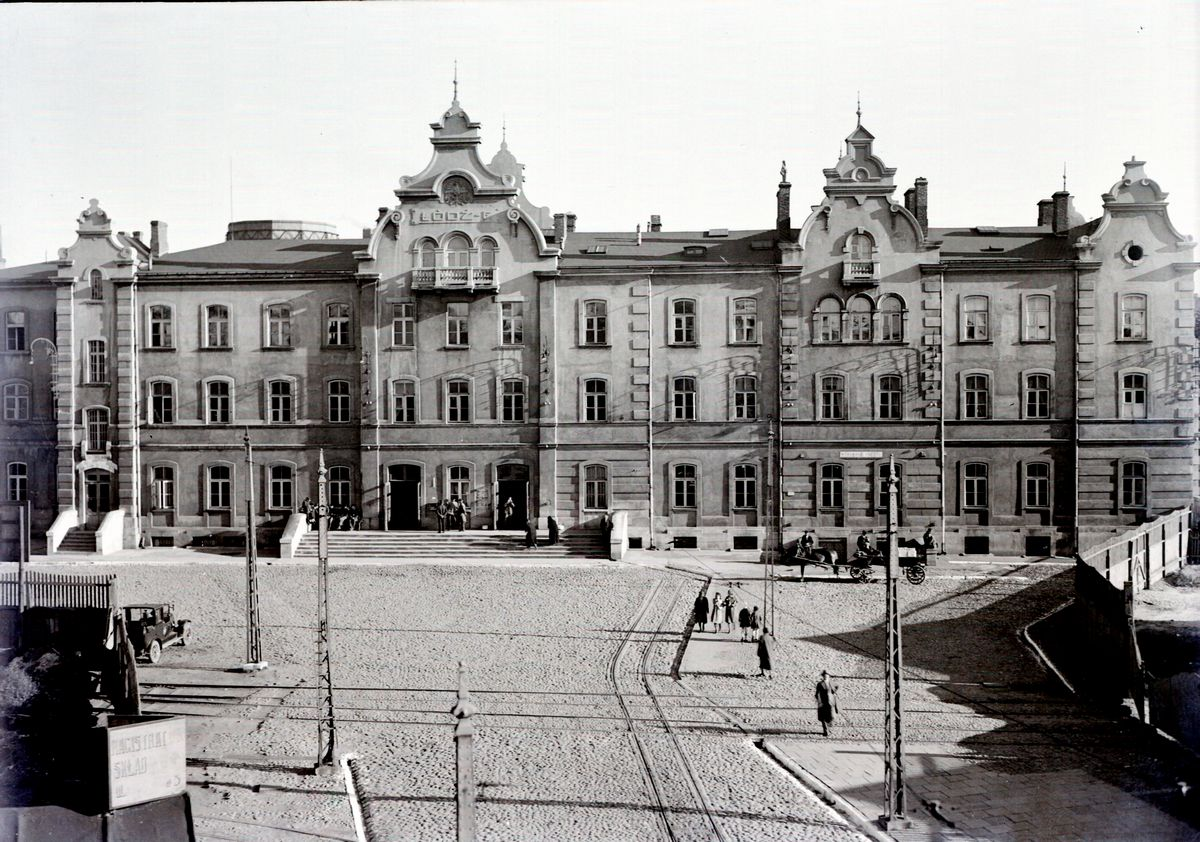
The old building, pictured in 1930, designed by Adolf Schimmelpfennig

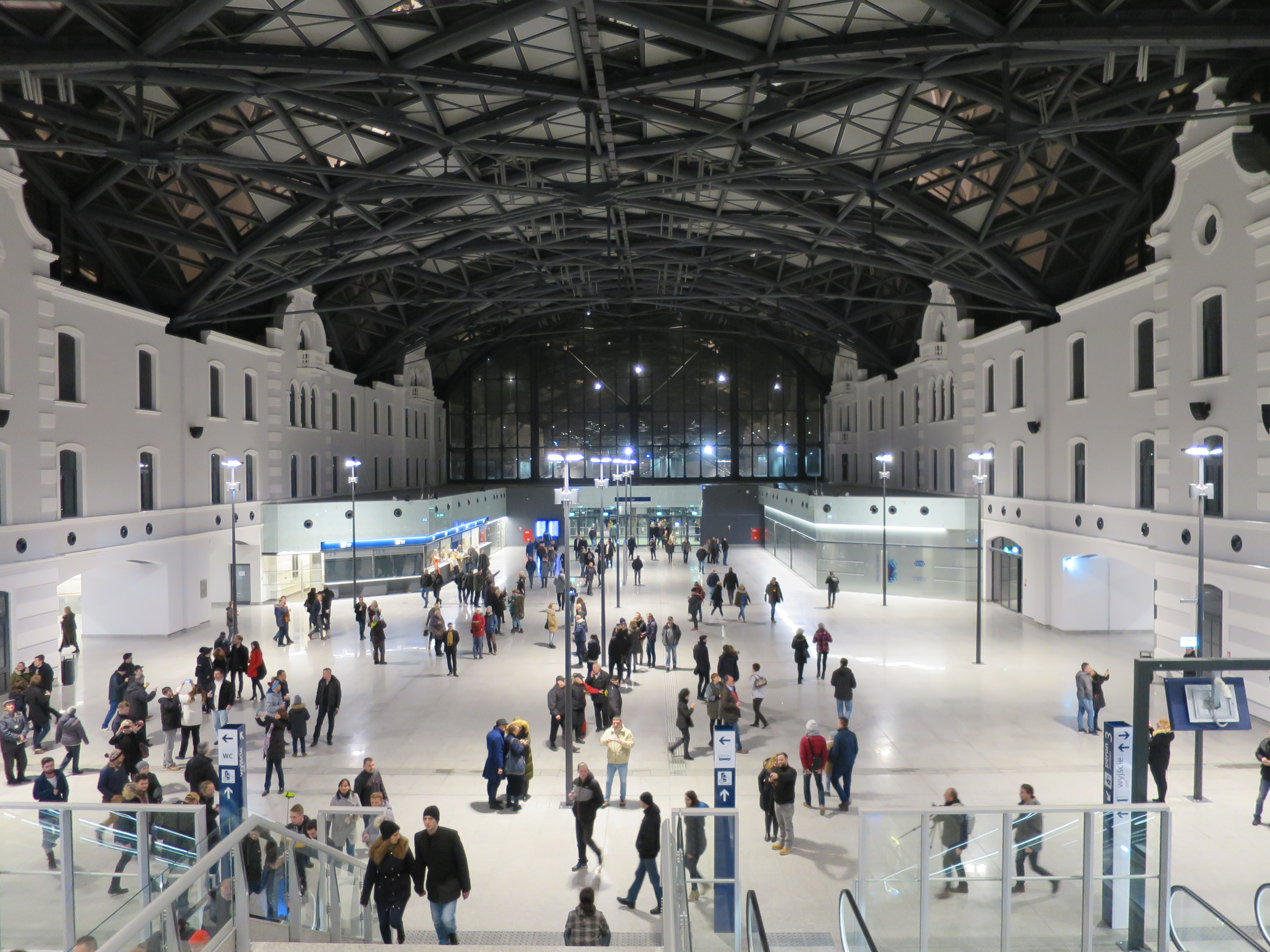
The new Łódź Fabryczna station interior in December 2016

Łódź Fabryczna in 2016

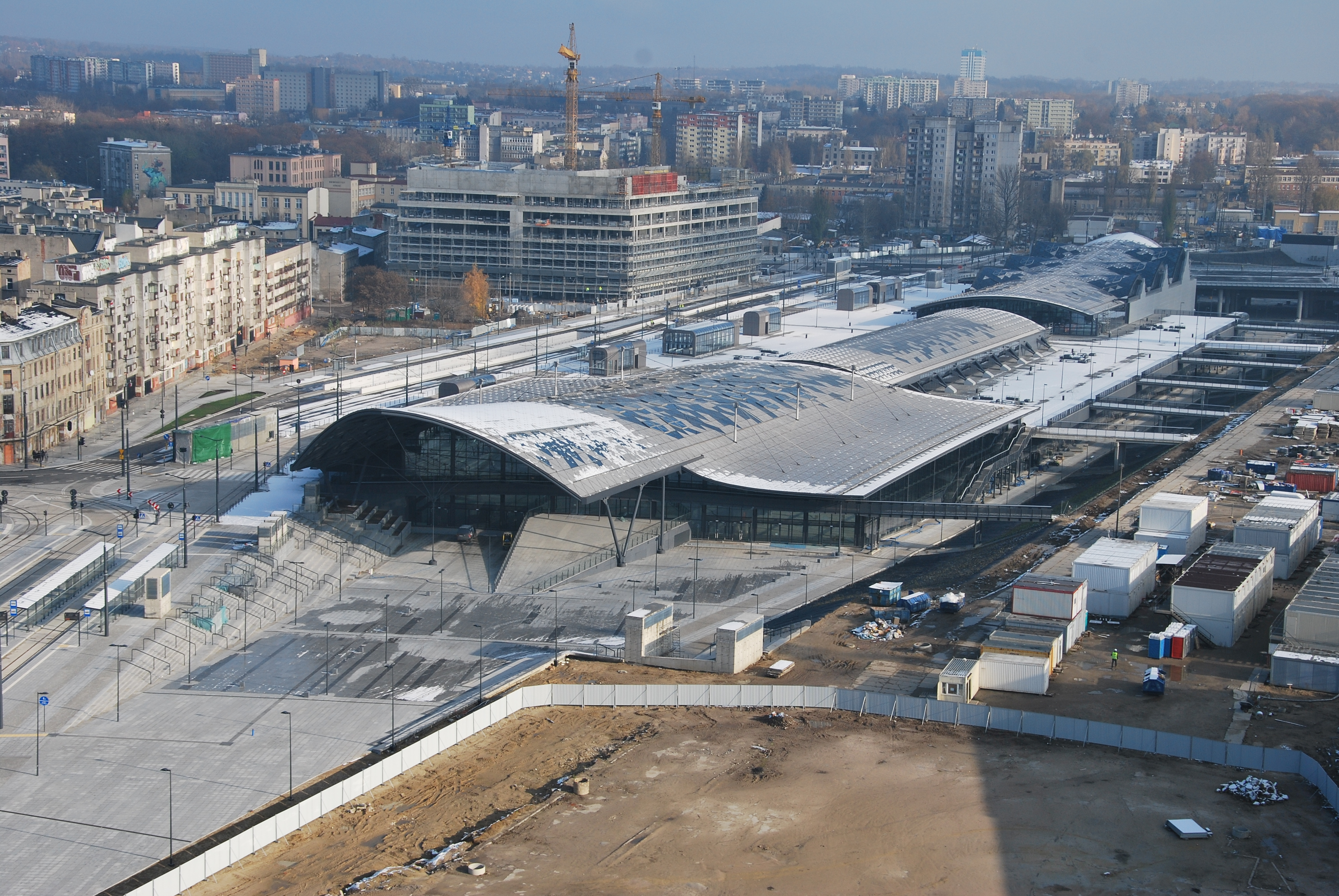
Aerial view of the station in 2016

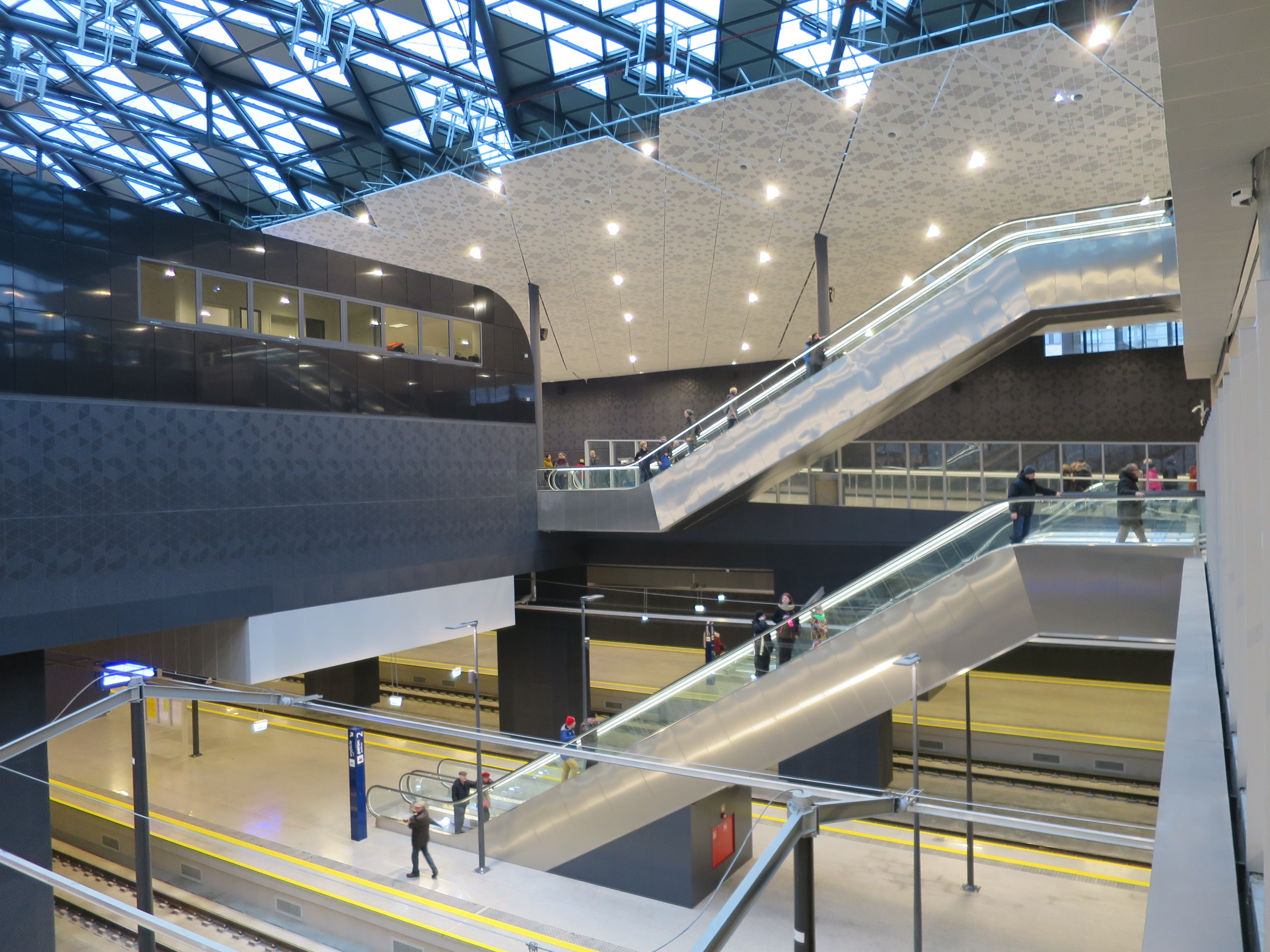
Interior

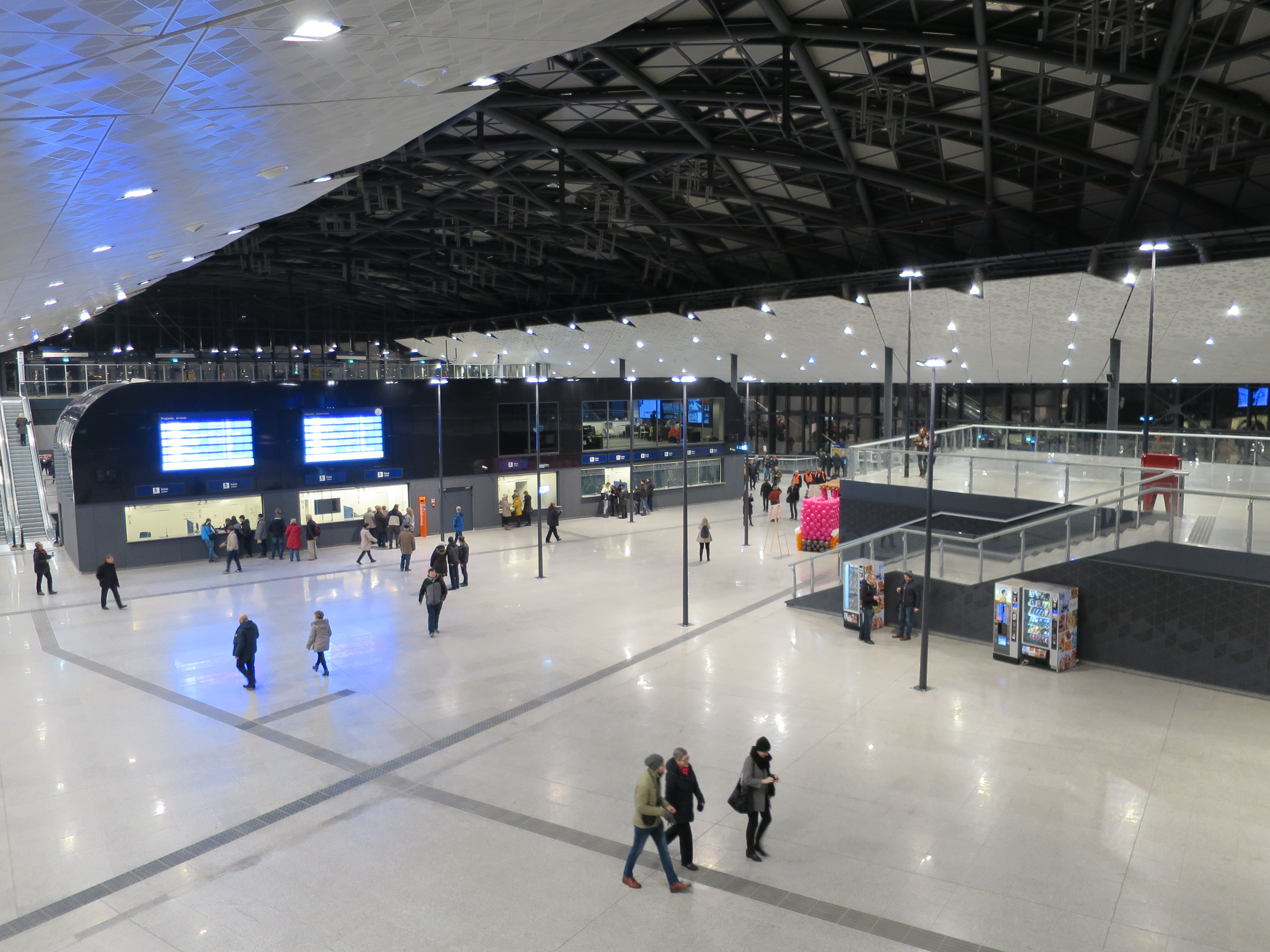
Main hall

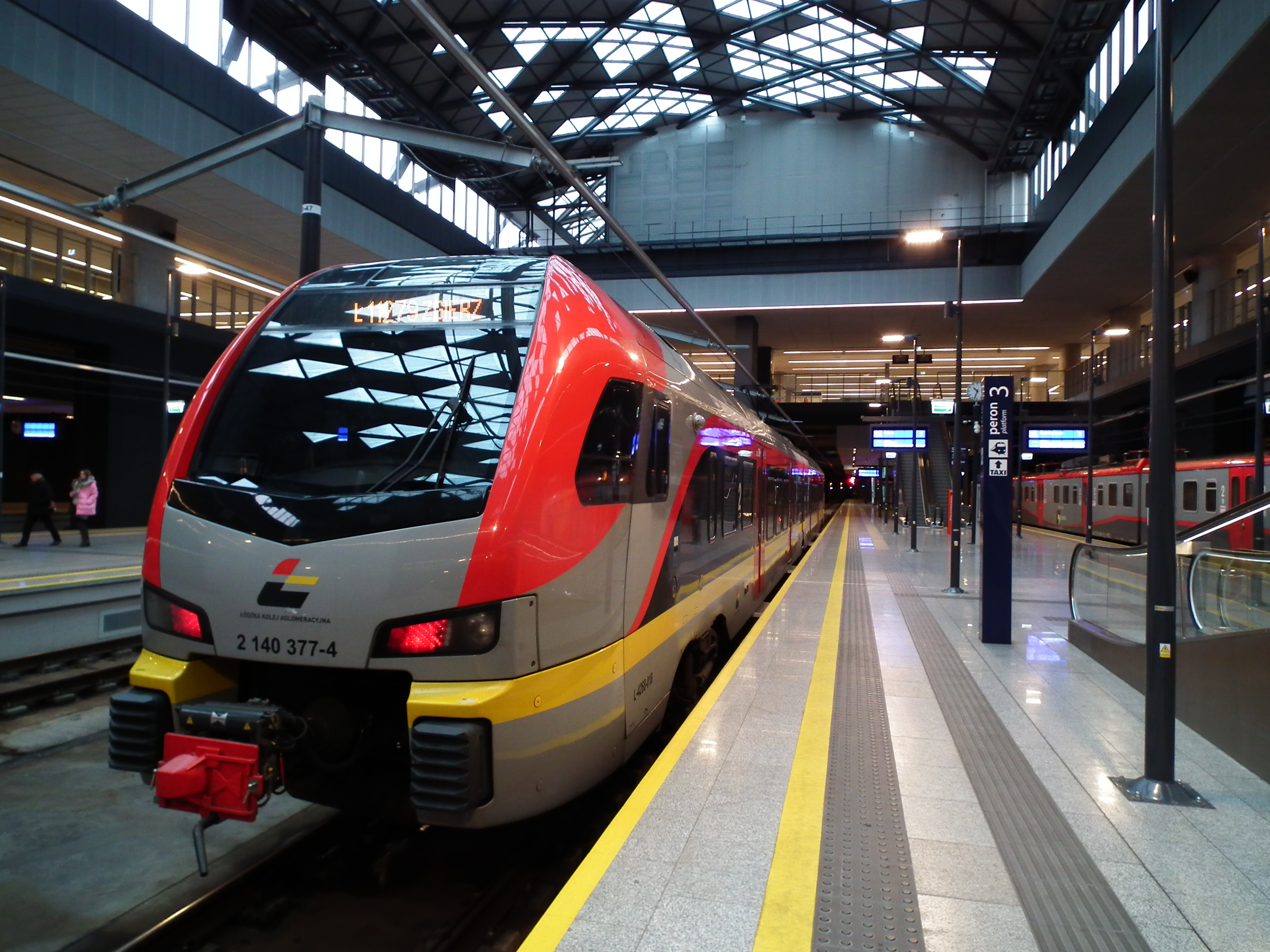
Platforms inside the station

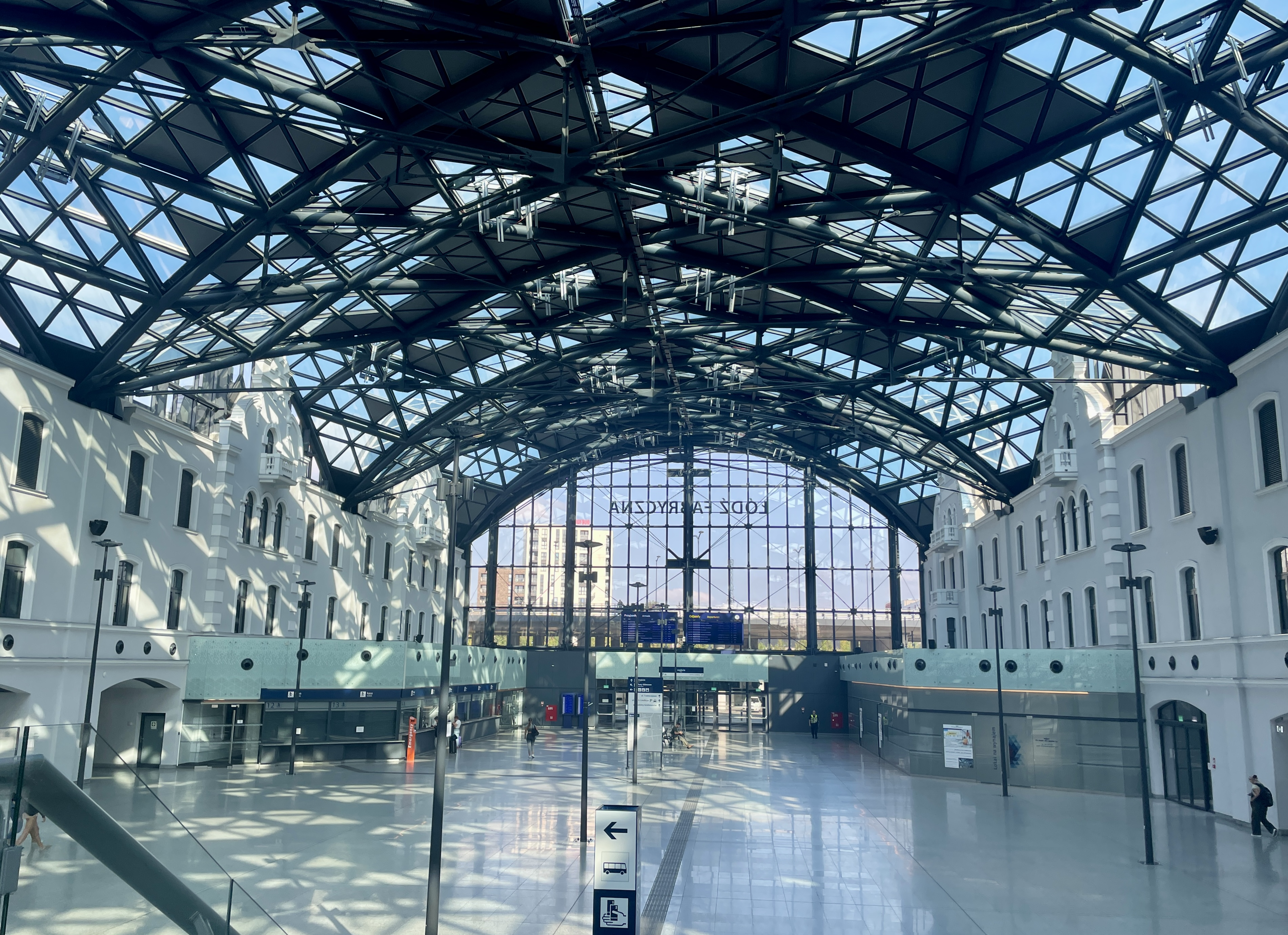
Main hall of the train station, 2025

== See also ==
- Rail transport in Poland
- Transport in Poland
- Polish State Railways
- List of busiest railway stations in Poland
