= Łowicz Główny railway station =

Railway station in Łowicz, Poland

Łowicz Główny
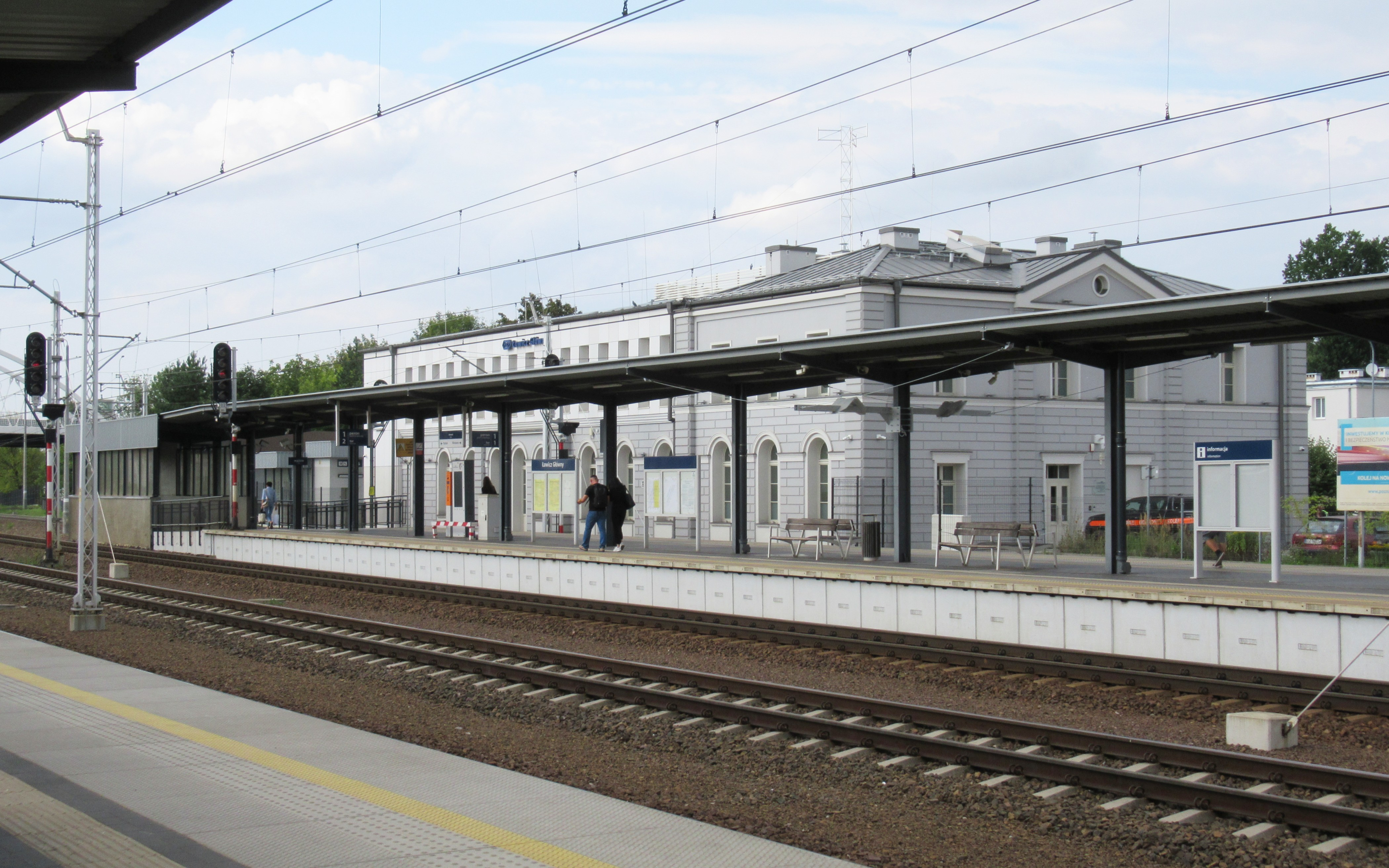
- Łowicz Główny railway station

General information
- Location: Łowicz, Łódź Voivodeship; Poland
- System: Railway Station
- Operator: PKP; Masovian Railways; Łódź Agglomeration Railway; Polregio
- Lines: 3: Warsaw–Kunowice railway 11: Skierniewice–Łowicz railway 15: Łowicz–Łódź railway
- Platforms: 4
- Tracks: 5

History
- Opened: 1861; 165 years ago
Location
- Location within Poland

Łowicz Główny (Polish, 'Łowicz Main') is a railway station serving the town of Łowicz, in the Łódź Voivodeship, Poland. The station opened in 1861 and is located on the Warsaw–Kunowice railway, Skierniewice–Łowicz railway and Łowicz–Łódź railway. The train services are operated by PKP, Masovian Railways, Łódź Agglomeration Railway and Polregio.

== Train services ==
The station is served by the following service(s):

- Intercity services Szczecin - Stargard - Krzyz - Poznan - Kutno - Lowicz - Warsaw - Lublin - Rzeszow - Przemysl
- Intercity services Szczecin - Stargard - Krzyz - Poznan - Kutno - Lowicz - Warsaw - Bialystok
- Intercity services Wroclaw - Ostrow Wielkopolskie - Jarocin - Poznan - Kutno - Lowicz - Warsaw
- Intercity services Kolobrzeg - Pila - Bydgoszcz - Torun - Kutno - Lowicz - Warsaw
- Intercity services Gorzow Wielkopolskie - Krzyz - Pila - Bydgoszcz - Torun - Kutno - Lowicz - Warsaw
- Intercity services Szczecin - Pila - Bydgoszcz - Torun - Kutno - Lowicz - Warsaw - Lublin - Rzeszow - Przemysl
- Intercity services Gdynia - Gdansk - Bydgoszcz - Torun - Kutno - Lowicz - Warsaw - Lublin - Rzeszow - Zagorz/Przemysl
- Intercity services Szczecin - Stargard - Krzyz - Poznan - Kutno - Lowicz - Lodz - Krakow
- Intercity services Bydgoszcz - Gniezno - Poznan - Kutno - Lowicz - Lodz - Krakow
- Regional services (KM) Kutno - Lowicz - Sochaczew - Blonie - Warsaw
- Regional services (R) Kutno - Lowicz - Skierniewice
- Regional services (LKA) Lowicz - Strykow - Zgierz - Lodz
- Regional services (LKA) Lowicz - Skierniewice

Preceding station	Masovian Railways	Following station
Kutno Terminus	R3	Mysłaków towards Warszawa Wschodnia or Warszawa Główna
Preceding station	Polregio	Following station
Niedźwiada Łowicka towards Kutno	PR	Bobrowniki towards Skierniewice
Preceding station	ŁKA	Following station
Terminus	Łódź - Łowicz	Łowicz Przedmieście towards Łódź Widzew
Bobrowniki towards Skierniewice	Skierniewice - Kutno	Niedźwiada Łowicka towards Kutno
