= Łódź–Bednary railway =

Railway line in Poland

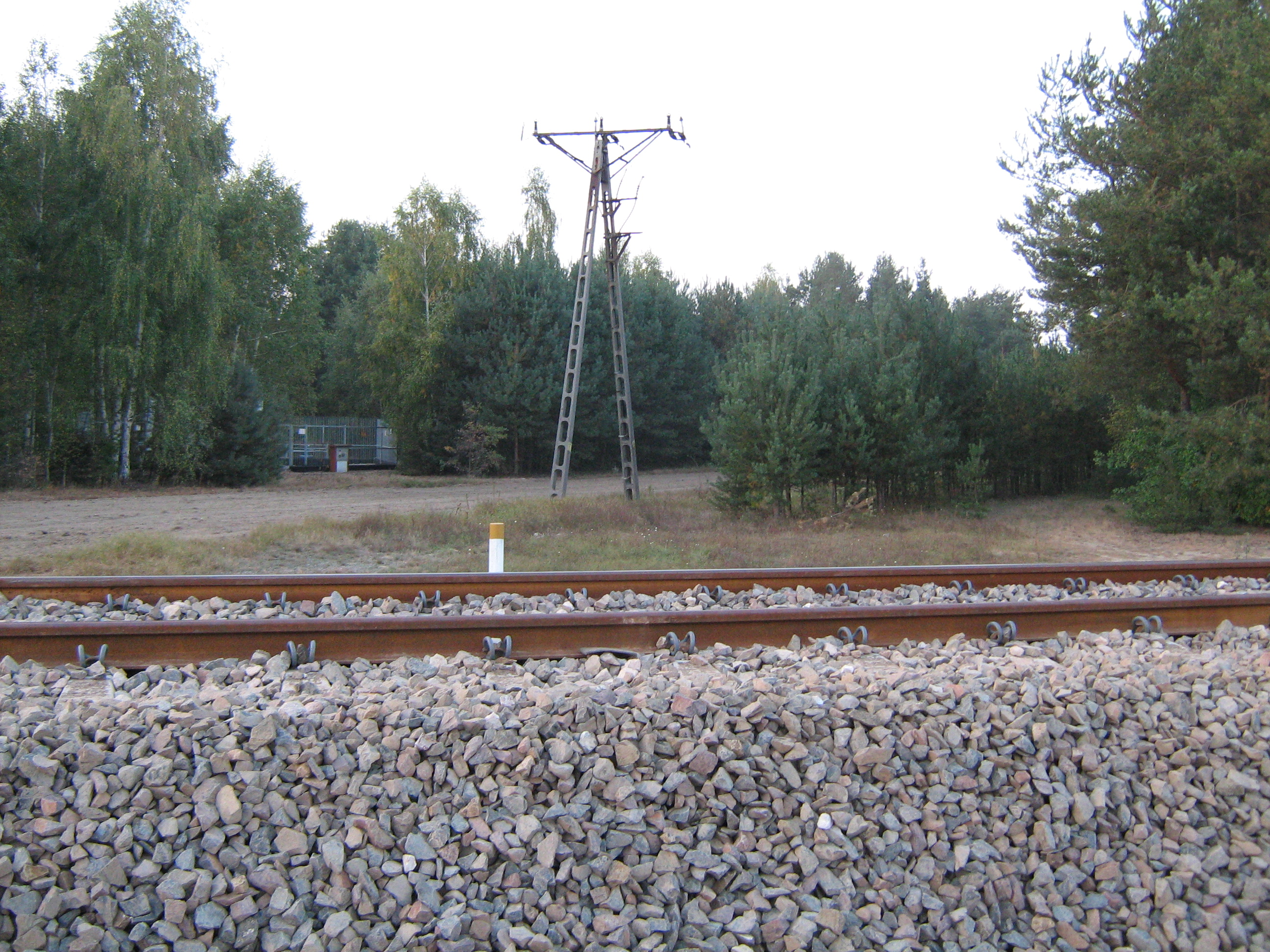
- A railway line in Nowe Grudze, in the background: the oil pipeline from Koluszki to Płock.

Overview
- Status: In use
- Owner: PKP PLK
- Line number: 15
- Locale: Łódź Voivodeship, Poland
- Termini: Bednary (Łowicz County); Łódź Kaliska
- Continues from: 3 Warsaw–Kunowice railway (from Warsaw)
- Continues as: 14 Łódź–Forst railway; 25 Łódź–Dębica railway
- Connecting lines: Łowicz Przedmieście: 531 to 11 Skierniewice–Łowicz railway; 532 to Łowicz Główny; Zgierz: 16 Łódź–Kutno railway

Service
- Type: Heavy rail

History
- Opened: 1902

Technical
- Track length: 68.285 km (42.430 mi)
- Number of tracks: 1 (Bednary-Zgierz); 2 (Zgierz-Łódź)
- Track gauge: 1,435 mm (4 ft 8 1/2 in)
- Electrification: Overhead wire, 3000 V DC
- Operating speed: 120 km/h (75 mph)

The Łódź–Bednary railway is a railway line located in Łódź Voivodeship, Poland, connecting the city of Łódź with the village of Bednary, located on Warsaw-Kunowice railway. It is commonly described as Łódź-Łowicz railway, because the passenger traffic on the railway is guided toward the main station in the town of Łowicz. The section from Zgierz to Łódź is a crucial part of a railway ring around the city.

== History ==
The railway line was opened in 1902 as the part of broad gauge Warsaw-Kalisz railway. During World War I it was rebuilt into standard gauge. Electrification of the line took place in 1965.

In the years 2007 the railway line was closed down due to poor condition of the tracks. Refurbishment took place between March and September 2011. Traffic was restored on 1 October 2011.

In the year 2013 the line received new stopping points, due to creation of Łódź Agglomeration Railway (ŁKA). Since 2015 ŁKA serves passenger traffic on the entire length of railway line. Previous operator, Polregio, only serves a section between Zgierz and Łódź Kaliska stations.

On 30 November 2018 PKP Polskie Linie Kolejowe and ZRK DOM signed an agreement to refurbish the railway line on the section between Łódź Kaliska and Zgierz stations, in order to increase the operational speed of the section from 80–120 km/h (50–75 mph)
